= Typhlocypris trigonella =

Conservation status
- Vulnerable (IUCN 2.3)

Scientific classification
- Kingdom: Animalia
- Phylum: Arthropoda
- Class: Ostracoda
- Order: Podocopida
- Family: Candonidae
- Genus: Typhlocypris
- Species: T. trigonella

Binomial name
- Typhlocypris trigonella (Klie, 1938)

Species of seed shrimp

Typhlocypris trigonella is a species of ostracod crustacean in the family Candonidae. It is endemic to Slovenia, where it is known only from Postojna Cave.
