= Areacandona yuleae =

Scientific classification
- Kingdom: Animalia
- Phylum: Arthropoda
- Class: Ostracoda
- Order: Podocopida
- Family: Candonidae
- Genus: Areacandona
- Species: A. yuleae

Binomial name
- Areacandona yuleae Karanovic, 2007

Species of seed shrimp

Holotype site: Yule River Bore Field, WA'"`UNIQ--ref-00000005-QINU`"'

Areacandona yuleae is a species of freshwater ostracod crustacean in the family Candonidae. It was originally described in 2007 by Ivana Karanovic, from specimens collected from the Pilbara region in Western Australia.
