= Lake Panamint =

Former lake in California, United States

- Lake Gale
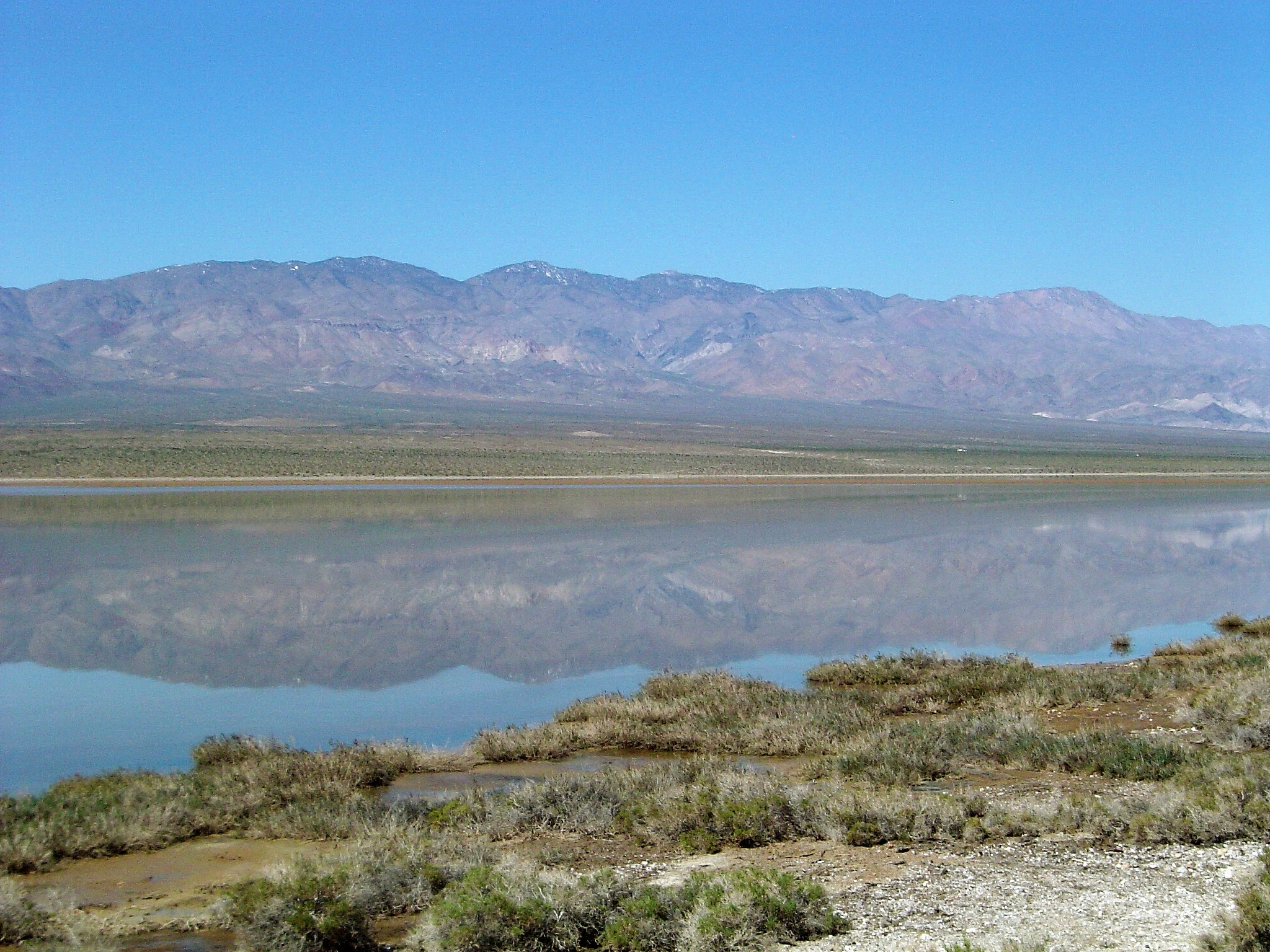
- Sometimes flooding causes part of the valley to re-form a lake

- Location within California Location within the United States
- Coordinates: 36°18′N 117°18′W
- Primary inflows: Owens River, local springs and drainages
- Primary outflows: Sometimes into Lake Manly

Lake Panamint (also known as Lake Gale) is a former lake that occupied Panamint Valley in California during the Pleistocene. It was formed mainly by water overflowing through the Owens River and which passed through Lake Searles into the Panamint Valley. At times, Lake Panamint itself overflowed into Death Valley and Lake Manly.

== Geography and geomorphology ==
The lake developed within Panamint Valley, California. This valley is a north–south trending depression that is bound between the Panamint Range in the northeast and the Argus Range-Slate Range in the west-southwest. The town of Ballarat lies in the valley, and California State Route 190 crosses the former lake basin in its northern sector. The existence of a lake in this valley was first postulated in 1914.

Lake Panamint was about 97 kilometres (60 mi) long and 8.0–9.7 kilometres (5–6 mi) wide, making it a long and narrow lake. Both the main inlet and the potential outlet were located in a narrower southern part. The total water volume was about 105 cubic kilometres (85,000,000 acre⋅ft). The lake consisted of two basins that were sometimes separated by the Wildrose and Ash Hill Horsts: The northern Lake Hill basin close to Panamint Springs and Big Four Mine Road and the southern Ballarat basin The total surface area of the lake was about 710 square kilometres (270 sq mi).

A number of shorelines have been identified in the valley, indicating variable water levels. There are two principal shorelines at 580–610 metres (1,900–2,000 ft) and 341–385 metres (1,119–1,263 ft), the c. 600 metres (2,000 ft) high shoreline is known as the Gale shoreline. There are a number of other shorelines which span an elevation range of about 300 metres (980 ft).

== Geology ==
The Panamint Valley lies in the southern Basin and Range Province, which has been subject to extensive Quaternary tectonic activity characterized by crustal extension along normal faults as well as strike-slip fault activity. Volcanic activity between 7.7 and 4 million years ago preceded the opening of the valley, leaving basalts stranded on either side. Subsequently, the Panamint Valley Fault Zone triggered subsidence of the valley floor and the separation of the formerly connected Darwin Plateau and Panamint Ranges.

Little tectonic activity occurred while the valley was flooded although lake sediments have been deformed by a 1.4–0.8 metres (4 ft 7 in – 2 ft 7 in) high fault scarp and fault offsets are observed in many places of the Panamint Valley, and while there is evidence for fault movement only a few hundred years ago, historical earthquake activity in the region is low.

Tufa deposits have been found in the Panamint Valley, some of which form fringing reefs and algal mounds. Lake Panamint has left clay, marl and silt deposits in Panamint Valley. Cobble beaches developed at the Nadeau Road and Lower Water Canyon localities, while wave-cut terraces were identified close to Ballarat and Big Four Mine Road and delta deposits close to Panamint Springs.

== Hydrology ==
The deserts of the Southwestern United States were not always as dry as today. During the ice ages, large lakes such as Lake Bonneville and Lake Lahontan developed in the Great Basin of the United States because of changes in the weather patterns of the region. In these times, the Laurentide Ice Sheet expanded and displaced the jet stream.

=== Inflow ===
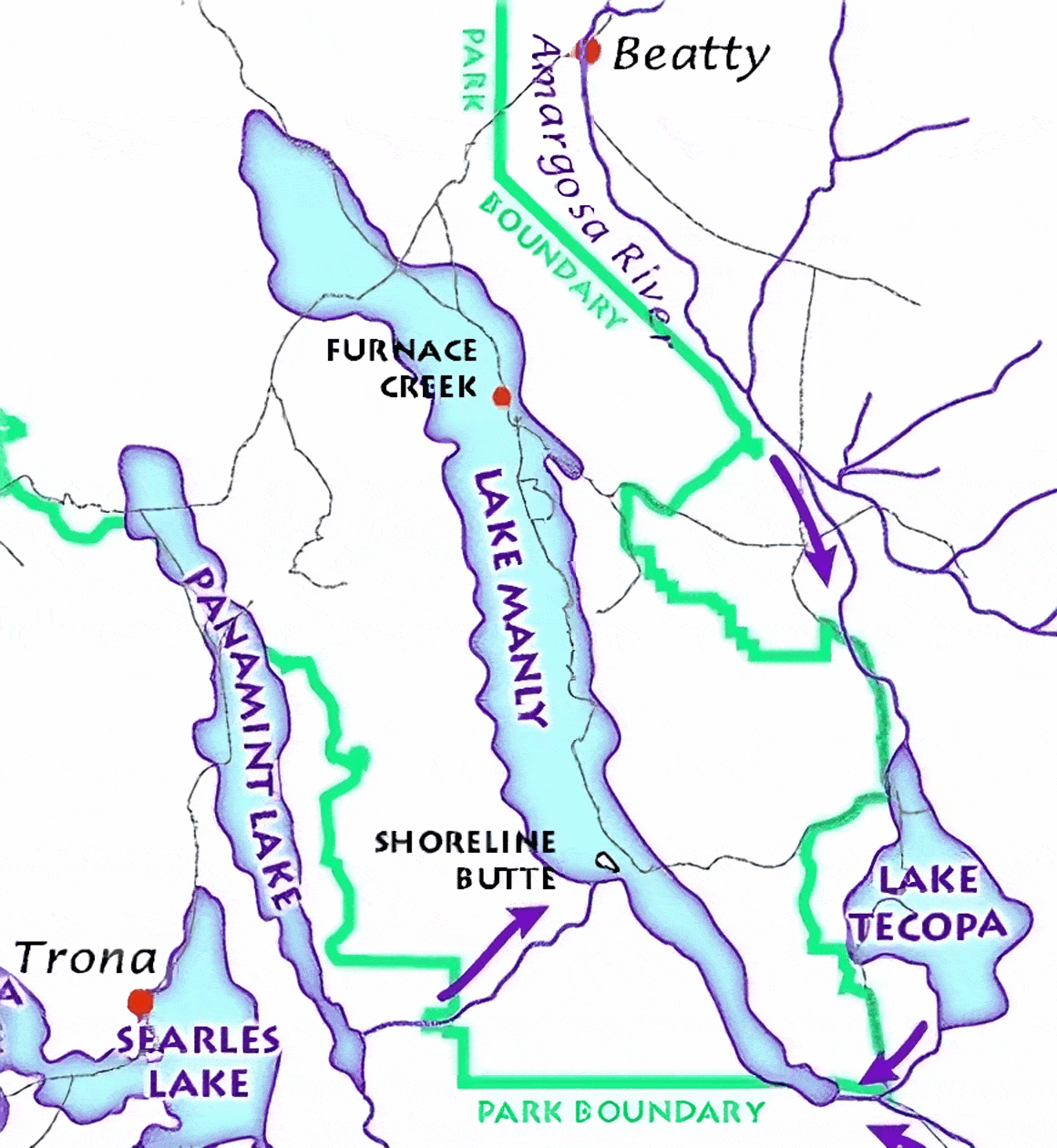
Pleistocene maps near Death Valley

Lake Panamint was part of a chain of lakes that started with Owens Lake and continued through China Lake and Searles Lake into Lake Panamint. During wet periods, the upstream lakes would overflow and fill the downstream lakes until the latter overflowed as well into the next lake. The source of this water was ultimately the Sierra Nevada and cations transported by this water have left their traces in the Panamint Valley. Such overflow episodes occurred four times between 700,000 and 350,000 years ago and then again 150,000, 120,000, 24,000 and 10,000 years ago, usually during periods where glaciers expanded on the Sierra Nevada; the last time where such water reached the Panamint Valley was 23,500 years before present.

During oxygen isotope stage 4 Lake Panamint was filled by groundwater, which comes in part from the Sierra Nevada and in part from the Panamint Range. There are also some hot springs that show evidence of geothermal heating and in general spring discharge sites close to faults are associated with peculiar coastal environments. Desert drainages also added water to Lake Panamint, some of these are still active today.

=== Overflow ===
Lake Panamint itself overflowed at times into Death Valley and its lake Lake Manly through Wingate Pass and Wingate Wash, forming a delta on the shorelines of Lake Manly where it entered the latter; such overflow restricted the maximum height that water levels in Panamint Valley could reach to about 610 metres (2,000 ft) above sea level, corresponding to a maximum depth of 285 metres (935 ft); the high shorelines lie at the same elevation as the Wingate Pass sill.

Overflow from Lake Panamint was a principal source of water for Lake Manly during the time the overflow was active. When such overflow occurred is unclear but apparently was restricted to oxygen isotope stage 6; during oxygen isotope stage 2 Lake Panamint was the terminal basin for the Owens River and no overflow occurred after about 30,000 years before present.

== Biology ==
Charophytes and widgeonweeds grew in Lake Panamint.

Freshwater snail and other gastropod fossils have been found in lake deposits such as tufa; genera found at Lake Panamint include Amnicola, Helisoma, Lymnaea, Valvata and Vorticifex. Fecal pellets from brine shrimps have been found in lake deposits.

Various fish such as suckers (Catostomus) and Western chubs (Gila and Siphateles) inhabited the lake when it was overflowing. Today they still occur in the Owens River system. When Lake Panamint existed, California voles used the rivers reaching to and from the lake to propagate across the desert.

Ostracods also lived in the lake waters, including Candona, Cyprideis and Limnocythere species. During shallow water periods, foraminifera also populated the lake, and the presence of diatoms and other planktonic fossils was reported already in the 1950s.

During the most recent highstand of Lake Panamint, humans occupied its shorelines and left stone tools. Chipped-stone crescents, a common archeological artifact in California, have been found on the former shores of Lake Panamint and geoglyphs have been observed in the northern sector of Lake Panamint.

== Lake history ==
Panamint Valley was flooded about five times over the last 100,000 years, coinciding with glacial periods. These lake stages have been assigned letter codes from oldest to youngest, "E", "F", "G", "H" and "I"; their chronology is often uncertain. Lake stages at Lake Panamint coincided with the Tahoe and Tioga glacier advances in the Sierra Nevada.

While the height of water levels during the Last Glacial Maximum was at first assumed to be about 383 metres (1,257 ft) above sea level, it was later found that Lake Panamint reached heights of 357–512 metres (1,171–1,680 ft). It is possible however that around 22,600 ± 130 years ago Lake Panamint was split into a northern basin sourced from local drainages and a southern one receiving water from Lake Searles. By 15,050 ± 80 years ago Lake Panamint began to recede as overflow from Searles ceased. By 14,925 radiocarbon years ago Lake Panamint was definitively receding.

Presently, the Panamint Valley is considered to be part of physiographical region of the Sonoran Desert and contains two playas, South Panamint Playa and North Panamint Playa. Panamint Spring and Warm Sulphurs Spring are active in the northwestern and east-central sectors of the valley.
