= Lake Manly =

Lake in Death Valley, California, United States

Coordinates: 36°00′N 116°48′W

- Lake Manley [sic], Death Valley Lake, Death Valley Pleistocene Lakes
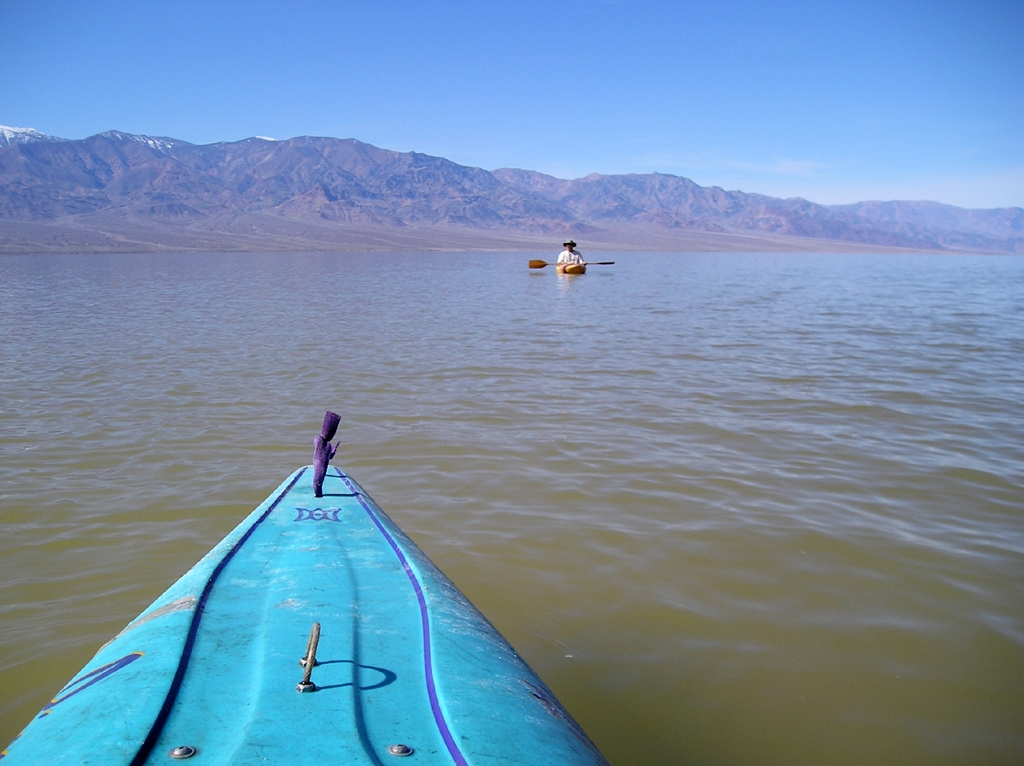
- Lake Manly occasionally reforms after strong precipitation

- Location within California Location within the United States
- Location: Death Valley, California
- Type: Pluvial lake
- Etymology: After William Lewis Manly
- Part of: Death Valley system, Great Basin
- Primary inflows: Amargosa River, Mojave River and Owens River at various points of time. Springs
- Primary outflows: Unlikely, possibly Colorado River
- Catchment area: 65,806 square kilometers (25,408 sq mi)
- Max. length: 140 kilometers (90 mi)
- Max. width: 9.7–17.7 kilometers (6–11 mi)
- Surface area: About 1,600 square kilometers (620 sq mi)
- Average depth: Up to 335 meters (1,099 ft)
- Water volume: 176 cubic kilometers (42 cu mi)
- Shore length^{1}: 320 kilometers (200 mi)
- Surface elevation: 47–90 meters (154–295 ft)
- ^{1} Shore length is not a well-defined measure.

Lake Manly was a pluvial lake in Death Valley, California. It forms occasionally in Badwater Basin after heavy rainfall, but at its maximum extent during the so-called "Blackwelder stand," ending approximately 120,000 years before present, the lake covered much of Death Valley with a surface area of 1,600 square kilometers (620 sq mi). Water levels varied through its history, and the chronology is further complicated by active tectonic processes that have modified the elevations of the various shorelines of Lake Manly; during the Blackwelder stage they reached 47–90 meters (154–295 ft) above sea level. The lake received water mainly from the Amargosa River and at various points from the Mojave River and Owens River. The lake and its substantial catchment favored the spread of a number of aquatic species, including some lizards, pupfish and springsnails. The lake probably supported a substantial ecosystem, and a number of diatoms developed there.

In Death Valley, lakes existed during different times in the geological past. After some poorly defined lake stages during the Miocene, Pliocene and early Pleistocene, the first large lake stage occurred about 185,000–128,000 years ago during the Tahoe glacial stage and formed the Blackwelder shorelines. This lake was the largest known extent of Lake Manly; theories that the lake merged with Lake Mojave farther south or even overflowed into the Colorado River close to Ludlow and across several other basins are, however, questionable. After the drying of this lake a later lake stage occurred 35,000–10,000 years ago during the Tioga/Wisconsin glaciation; this lake was smaller than the Blackwelder lake. During the Holocene, the lake disappeared; today only ephemeral lakes occur in Death Valley during strong floods.

This lake is one among many major lakes that formed in the Great Basin, the best researched of which are Lake Lahontan and Lake Bonneville. Decreasing temperatures and thus decreased evaporation rates as well as increased precipitation rates during the ice ages were responsible for the formation of these lake systems. Lake Manly collected the overflow from a number of lakes including Lake Tecopa, Mono Lake, Owens Lake, Searles Lake, Lake Panamint, Lake Mojave, Lake Dumont and Lake Manix. Not all of them existed or drained into Lake Manly simultaneously.

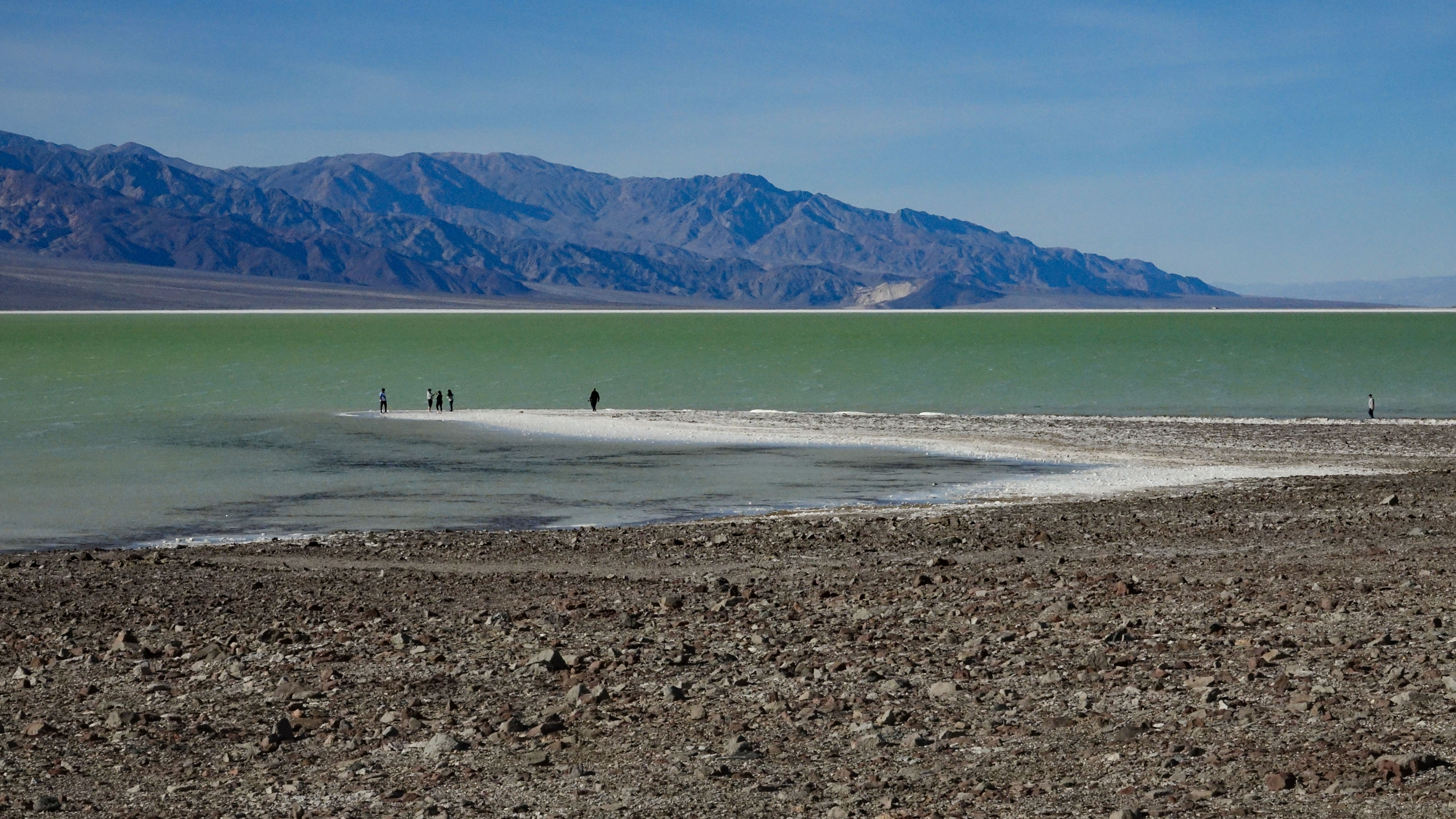
Lake Manly from Badwater, Death Valley, Dec 2023 a few months after floods from Hurricane Hilary

== Discovery and naming ==
The existence of large ancient lakes in the Great Basin of the United States was already proposed by the end of the 19th century, when the existence of Lake Lahontan and Lake Bonneville was first described. The possibility of a former lake in Death Valley was also considered during that time, though at first it was not universally accepted as a large lake. The first evidence for it was described in 1924 by geologist Levi F. Noble. Earlier in 1890 another geologist, Grove Karl Gilbert, already assumed a lake existed in Death Valley, although his lake was considerably larger than actual Lake Manly.

Evidence for the lake's existence includes wavecut terraces observed by geologists in 1925, pebbles and tufa, layers of clay and salt on its former lake bed, and calcium carbonate deposits that were probably formed by algae in the lake. These clues are dispersed across Death Valley, especially within the more researched areas of Beatty Junction and Desolation Canyon.

While the deposits were once attributed to a single lake stand, later evidence was found of various lake cycles going back to the Pliocene. The history of Lake Manly is not as well understood as that of Lake Lahontan and Lake Bonneville, the two largest pluvial lakes recorded in the Great Basin. More recently, renewed scientific interest has stemmed from the fact that Lake Manly formerly drained the area of Yucca Mountain, a proposed nuclear waste repository.

The lake was named in honor of William Lewis Manly, who rescued his traveling party stranded in Death Valley in 1849. The name "Lake Rogers" for a potential northern lake in Death Valley was derived from a compatriot of Manly, John Rogers. The name "Lake Manly" was coined in 1932, and is sometimes spelled as "Manley", which is a misspelling. Other names for the lakes in Death Valley are "Death Valley Pleistocene lakes" and "Death Valley Lake", a name first used in a publication of 1902.

The name is used for the lakes that occupied Death Valley in the past, but occasionally the name "Lake Manly" is used only for the most recent, the middle Pleistocene lake stage or general late Pleistocene lake stages.

== Geography ==
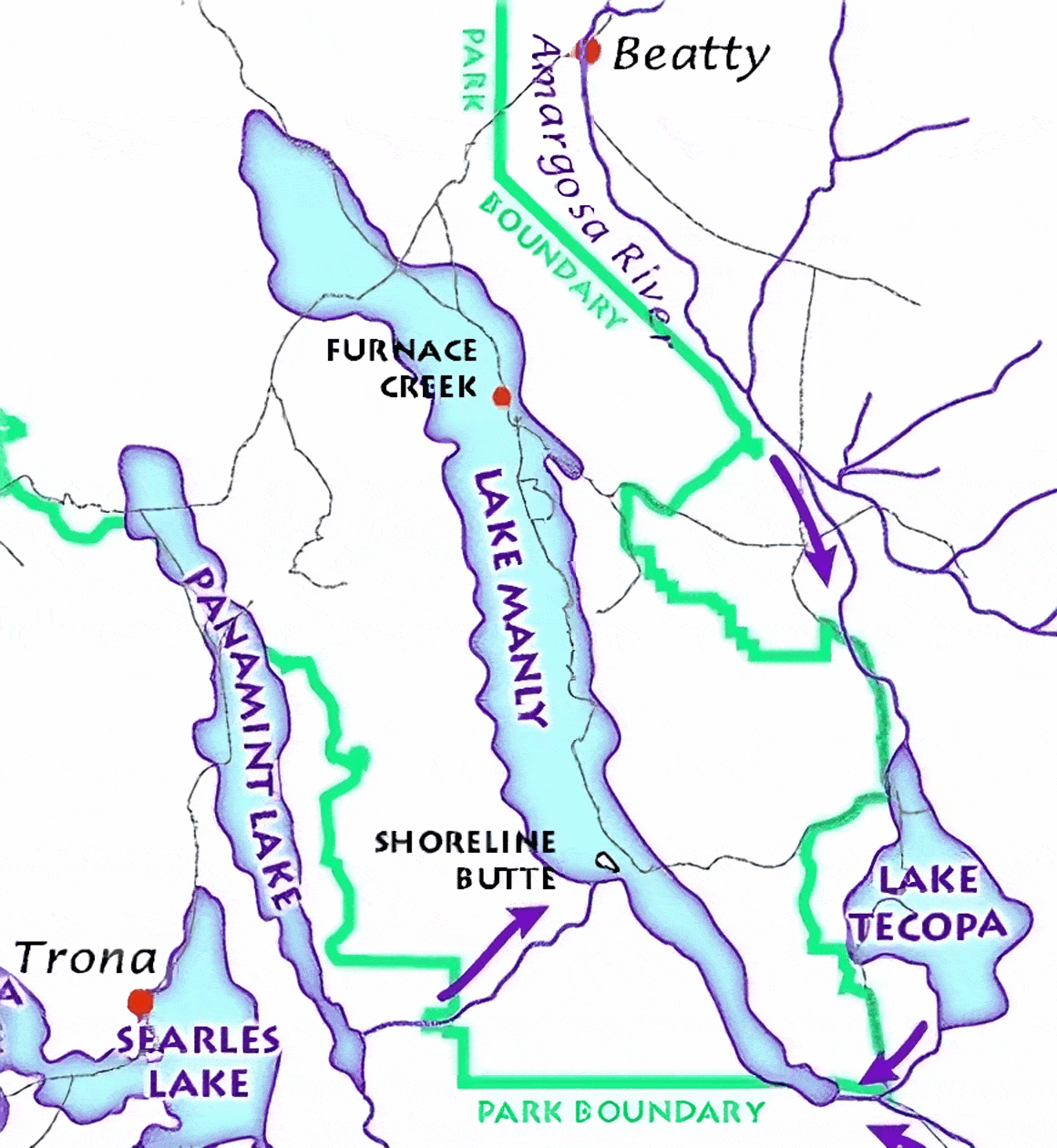
The drainage system of Lake Manly; present-day roads are shown for reference.

Lake Manly formed in Death Valley, a tectonic depression framed by the Cottonwood Mountains and Panamint Range to the west, Owlshead Mountains to the south and Black Mountains, Funeral Mountains and Grapevine Mountains to the east. Death Valley is about 120 miles (200 km) long and 6–20 miles (10–30 km) wide and consists of three basins: Badwater Basin which reaches a depth of 282 feet (86 m) beneath sea level, Cottonball Basin and Middle Basin. The Badwater Basin is the deepest point in North America. Death Valley began forming about 14 million years ago, and by the Pliocene it was well developed. The valley remains deep due to vertical faulting, which occurs faster there than anywhere else in the US. Various types of rocks form the surface areas of Death Valley, some going back as far as the Precambrian.

The Death Valley is tectonically active, with faults including the Black Mountains fault, Furnace Creek Fault, Grandview Fault, Northern Death Valley Fault, Southern Death Valley fault and Towne Pass Fault. Thus, shorelines from the same lake stands are often not at the same elevation in various parts of the basin. Faulting has caused a progressive drop in elevation of the floor of Death Valley, keeping pace with sedimentation, though the exact rates are not known. This deformation causes the southwestern shores of Lake Manly to sag with respect to the northeastern ones, and together with sedimentation renders estimating the depth of Lake Manly unreliable. This is compounded by the fact that many lake deposits are located close to the active faults of the Death Valley fault zone. Over the last 60,000–70,000 years, the Northern Death Valley fault zone has slipped by about 0.18–0.20 inches per year (4.5–5 mm/a). Lack of earthquakes and dates makes it difficult to estimate the activity of these faults, though an earthquake occurred in 1908, and Death Valley is actively subsiding. Volcanism has also affected Death Valley, including Ubehebe Crater in the valley and the distant Mono-Inyo Craters, all within the last 2,000 years.

=== The lake ===
Lake Manly was a long, narrow lake with a southern sub-basin named "Confidence Flats". It was about 595–605 feet (181–184 m) deep at highstand, and about 310 feet (94 m) above sea level. The lake reached a width of 6–11 miles (9.7–17.7 km) and length of 90 miles (140 km). The shores of the lake were 320 kilometers (200 mi) long. The most prominent shoreline at about 300 feet (90 m) elevation is known as "Blackwelder shoreline"; even higher shorelines have been identified at Shoreline Butte. At this stand, the lake had a surface area of about 620 square miles (1,600 km^{2}) using present-day topography; at that point the volume would have been about 42 cubic miles (176 km^{3}). The absolute highest surface area Lake Manly could have had (at overflow height) was 8,000 square kilometers (3,100 sq mi) or 12,000 square kilometers (4,600 sq mi). Some landforms indicative of lacustrine deposition have been found at altitudes of 595 meters (1,952 ft) (the overflow height) above sea level around Death Valley but they could also be the consequences of non-lacustrine processes.

Southern California and southern Nevada contain deserts with valleys similar to Death Valley that are also not formed by rivers. Many of them held water in the past; some lakes such as Great Salt Lake, Mono Lake, Pyramid Lake and Walker Lake still exist. These ancient lakes were ultimately generated by Basin and Range province tectonic phenomena which caused runoff to collect in closed basins. Various weather changes associated with the Last Glacial Maximum favored their infilling, including southward shifts of storm tracks accompanying analogous shifts of the jet stream, which were probably forced by the Laurentide Ice Sheet. Currently a salt pan fills Death Valley, with an average surface altitude of −246 feet (−75 m).

One island existed close to Beatty Junction, with two more at Shoreline Butte in the southernmost point of the lake; the northern foot of the Avawatz Mountains may have formed a peninsula on the southern shore. No river deltas or other embankments have been found at Lake Manly's shorelines; their formation was likely hampered by unstable water levels. Only vague remnants of a delta are found where the Amargosa River probably entered Lake Manly, and the alluvial fan of Warm Springs Canyon is cut by shorelines of Lake Manly. Chevrons and pisolites have been found in lake sediments. A number of alluvial fans decorate the former shores of Lake Manly.

=== Shorelines ===
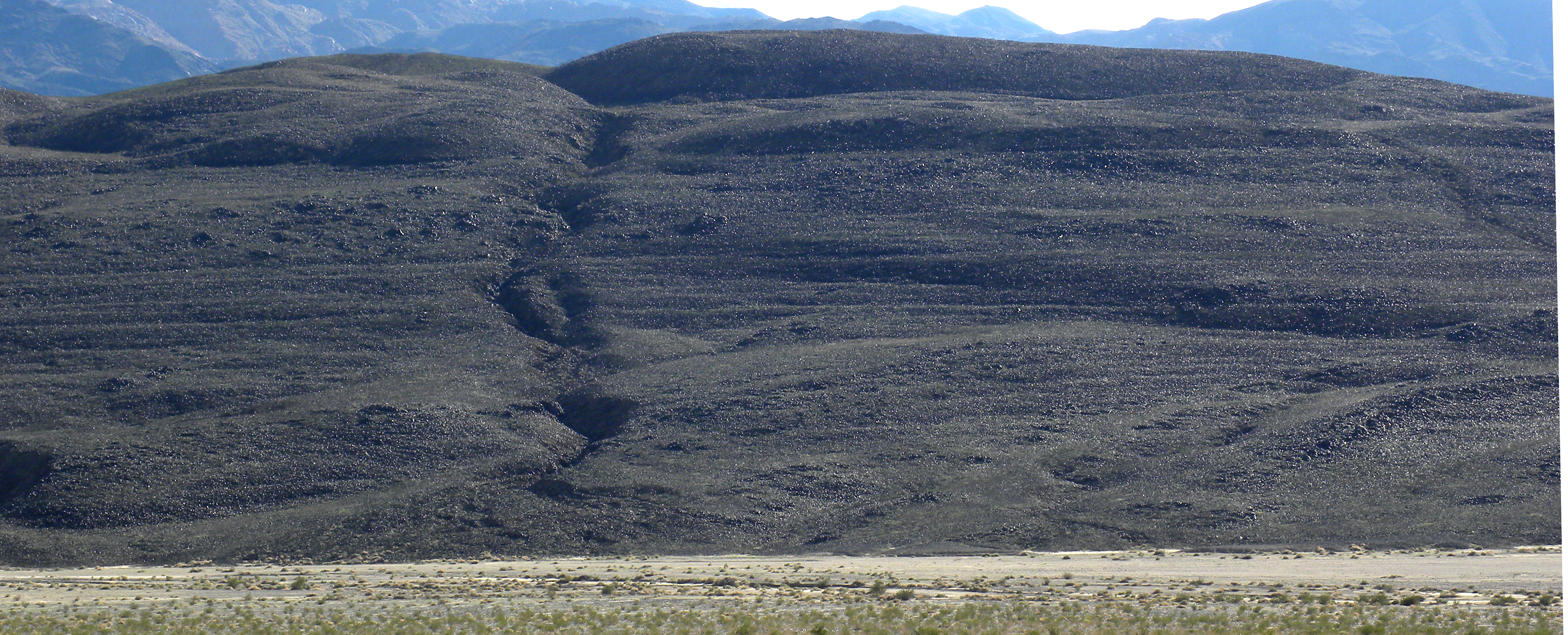
Shoreline Butte, close with shorelines visible

Landforms associated with Lake Manly have been identified at a number of points in Death Valley. At Beatty Junction, winds on the lake formed several spits and barrier bars. Shorelines at Desolation Canyon also included spits and a tombolo. Just south of Desolation Canyon, the so-called Manly Terraces are a group of 850-to-300-meter-wide (2,790 to 980 ft) terraces. At least 12 different terraces have been found at Shoreline Butte.

A number of bars and spits formed on the shores of Lake Manly and are preserved to this day. Some rocks in shoreline deposits left by the lake display evidence of honeycomb weathering. The southern shore of Lake Manly was formed by alluvial fans that had coalesced at the foot of the Avawatz Mountains; these fans are still growing and displacing the Amargosa River eastwards. Some sand and gravel deposits at Salt Spring Hills with elevations of about 180 meters (590 ft) may have been formed by either Lake Manly or another paleolake south of Death Valley, Lake Dumont.

The shores of Lake Manly were influenced by wave action. These waves probably came predominantly from the north-northwest, causing near shore material to be transported to the south. This also explains why most of the shore features are found on the eastern shores of the lake as these were the most exposed to wave action. It is not always clear whether a strandline is actually a strand line or a surface expression of fault activity; some supposed lower strandlines at Mormon Point were later reinterpreted as fault scarps.

== Hydrology ==
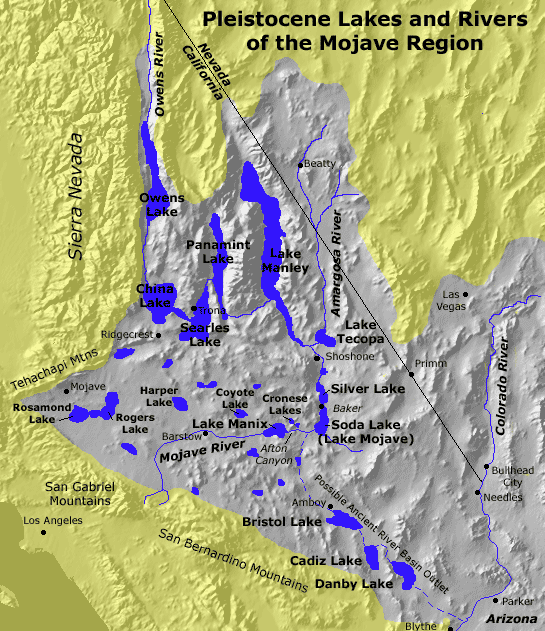
Lacustrine system of the Mojave Desert

The size of pluvial lakes, such as Lake Manly, is governed by the balance between inflow by precipitation or rivers or streams and evaporation, if one assumes that seepage and overflow are not important. This can make the surface of such lakes a useful gauge for paleoclimatic conditions. The principal water supplies to Lake Manly were the Amargosa River, the Mojave River and the Owens River, which yielded a large integrated drainage system over the southwestern Great Basin. The total surface area of Lake Manly's catchment was about 65,806 square kilometers (25,408 sq mi). Contrary to what early researchers first speculated it is however likely, that the three rivers never reached Lake Manly simultaneously.

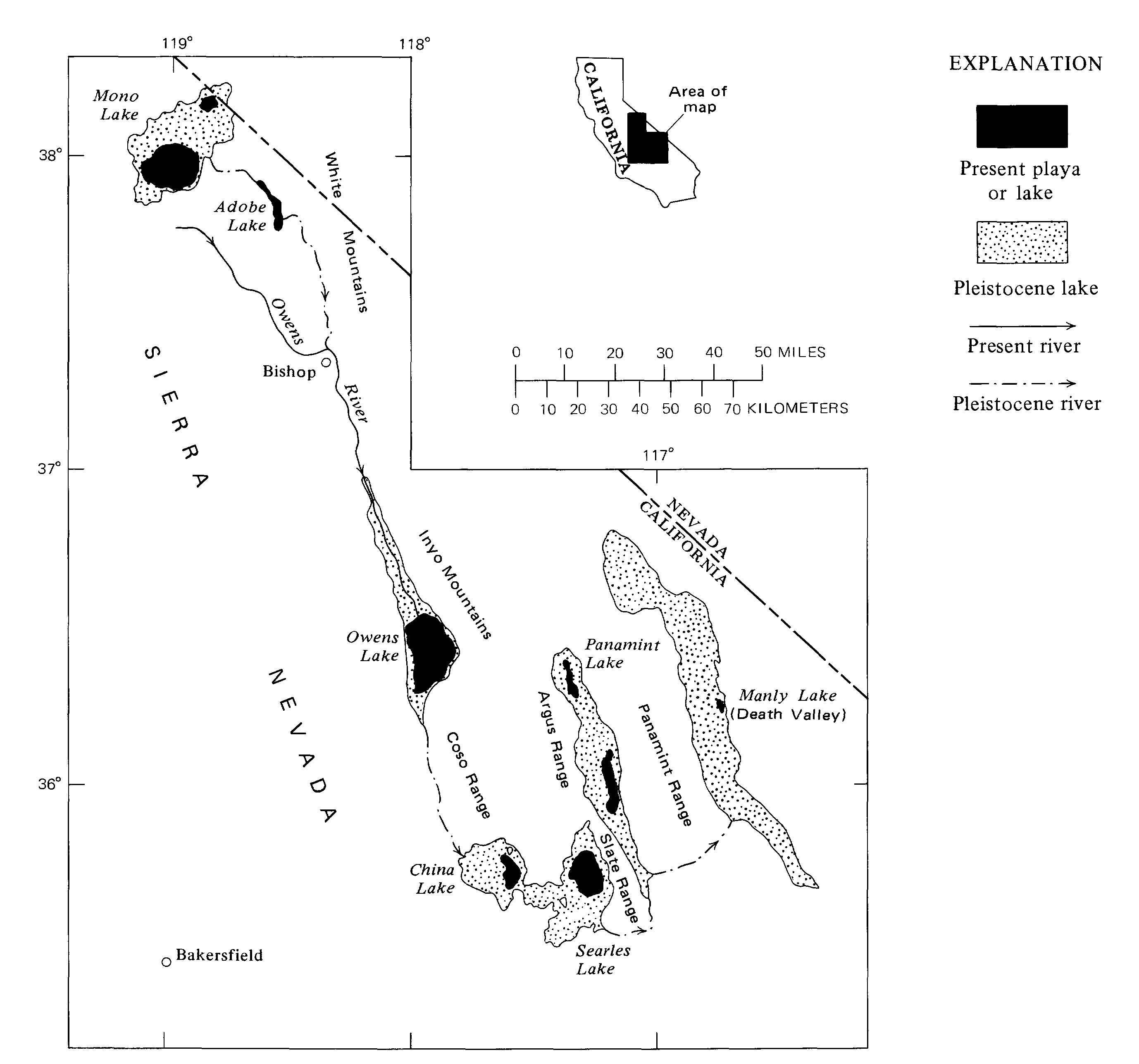
The Owens River-Lake Manly system

=== Inflow ===
The principal river flowing into Lake Manly was the Amargosa River. It originally ended in Lake Tecopa; only more recently than 600,000 years ago did it arrive at Death Valley, possibly as recently as 140,000 to 18,000 years ago. Even earlier, the Amargosa River may have flowed towards the Colorado River.

The Mojave River may have reached the Amargosa and thus drained into Lake Manly, but probably only during wet periods, and only since the most recent Pleistocene; the breaching of the intermediary lakes Lake Manix, Lake Mojave, and Lake Dumont occurred later than 18,000 years before present, and earlier overflow is uncertain. Before the time where it flowed into these lakes, the Mojave River drained westward. Overflow from Lake Mojave may have continued until 8,000 years ago. The Mojave River reached the Amargosa through Silurian Valley and Salt Creek; on its way it crossed Dry Lake, Silurian Lake and another pond at the foot of the Salt Spring Hills. Currently, the integration of the Mojave River into Death Valley is nearly complete; once the basin of Lake Mojave has been filled completely with sediment to the altitude of its own spillway, even under current conditions its waters will reach Death Valley.

At least during the Tahoe glaciation, the Owens River drained into Lake Manly after filling Owens Lake, China Lake, Searles Lake and the Panamint Valley. This river system formed 3.2 million years ago when lava flows blocked a channel that had previously drained the Owens River across the Sierra Nevada. Sediment data indicate that 900,000–800,000 and 700,000–600,000 years ago waters from Panamint Valley reached Lake Manly, as chloride was being removed from the valley at that time. Increased precipitation and the formation of glaciers on the eastern Sierra Nevada increased the amount of water in the Owens River, and decreased temperatures reduced evaporation at each of these lakes, thus allowing water to get from lake to lake. When Panamint Lake reached a water depth of 270 metres (900 ft), it spilled over Wingate Pass into Lake Manly. Little evidence of such spillover remains, such as delta-like deposits at Anvil Spring Canyon, the distribution of fish fossils in the various waterbodies, ostracod data and the presence of northupite; strontium isotope data suggest that the Owens River system was a minor contributor to Lake Manly. Sediments in Panamint Valley suggest that the last time that Panamint Valley overflowed into Death Valley was 95,000–55,000 years ago although the dates display a lot of scatter; during the early Holocene and Tioga glaciation, the Owens River stopped in Lake Searles, considering that lower shorelines at Lake Searles do not appear to correspond to any shoreline in Panamint Valley and Death Valley, and no evidence has been found at Wingate Pass for overflow after 30,000 years ago. Runoff from the region that the Owens River originates from may have contributed to Lake Manly during the Pliocene, most likely through different paths however. Whether Owens River water reached Lake Manly between 1.2 and 0.6–0.51 million years ago is unclear.

These rivers in turn received inflow from other paleolakes, such as Lake Pahrump which drained into the Amargosa River and shares fish with the latter, Lake Dumont/Lake Manix/Lake Mojave which were passed through by the Mojave River, and after 1.6 million years ago Lake Russell (present day Mono Lake) through the Owens River. This later connection is biologically significant as Mono Lake was variously connected with the San Joaquin River and Lake Lahontan; thus it could have been a pathway for life to propagate between these water systems, a notion supported by fish fossil data such as the minnows and suckerfish of the Death Valley system which appear to originate in Lake Lahontan. Lake Lahontan might have drained into Lake Manly; one potential pathway would be from the Walker Lake basin over Soda Springs Valley, Fish Lake Valley and Eureka Valley where it may have been joined by overflow from Deep Springs Valley. All these valleys are at successively lower elevations. Connections to the Colorado River also existed: There is evidence that the Amargosa River captured a tributary of the latter in the Indian Springs Valley area; such an event may have transferred fish along with the about 390 square kilometers (150 mi^{2}) large catchment from the Colorado River to the Lake Manly system. Before integrating with Lake Manly, the Mojave River may have exited Lake Manix towards Ludlow, California and from then into the Colorado, before diverting to Lake Mojave and then into Lake Manly.

Overall, this formed a large system of interconnected lakes, the largest of the Great Basin and also the basin's largest catchment. In total, runoff at the time of Lake Manly was at least 3.5 times larger than today. A southward shift of the polar front may have aided the formation of Lake Manly.

Further water reached the lake from streams in the Amargosa Mountains and the Panamint Mountains, where water originates from snowmelt. Presently, the main inflows are from Salt Creek from the north and the Amargosa River, with springs around the basin contributing a large proportion of the present day water budget in the valley. Other such streams include Furnace Creek, Hanaupah Canyon, Point Canyon, Six Springs Canyon and Willow Springs Canyon.

Springs also contributed water to Lake Manly, especially during the early lake stage. These springs would have helped stabilize the water levels. In turn, Lake Manly would have affected the local water table. The brines and evaporites indicate that spring water contributed to the hydrology of Lake Manly. Present day groundwater originates primarily from Spring Mountain.

=== Outlet ===
According to early researchers, Lake Manly had no outlet and its water level would have been governed exclusively by the balance of inflow and evaporation. Biological evidence, however, such as fossil pupfish, indicates that connections to the Colorado River existed, then ceased about 3-2 million years ago. More generally, evidence for Miocene drainage of Death Valley to the Pacific Ocean exists.

A major research issue remains as to whether Lake Manly ever drained into the Colorado River. Such a drainage may have occurred through Broadwell Lake across the c. 580 meters (1,900 ft) high pass close to Ludlow, and entered the Colorado close to present-day Parker, Arizona, after passing through Bristol Lake, Cadiz Lake and Lake Danby. Potentially such an overflow, if it existed, would have reached rates of 2,000 cubic metres per second (71,000 cu ft/s). Overall though scientific consensus tends to view any connection between Lake Manly and the Colorado more recent than 3 million years ago as unlikely.

There is no evidence that Lake Manly reached such an elevation, though shorelines may have been obscured by later alluvial fans. A prominent channel, 9 meters (30 ft) deep and 30–40 meters (98–131 ft), over Ash Hill (the pass in question) may have been the overflow channel, but it could also be the product of local runoff. Further, there is no indication that Bristol Lake, the lake that water from an overflow would have entered into, was ever filled with freshwater in the last four million years; though foraminifera correlated with the Colorado River have been found, and some sedimentary and fish evolutionary data likewise support it.

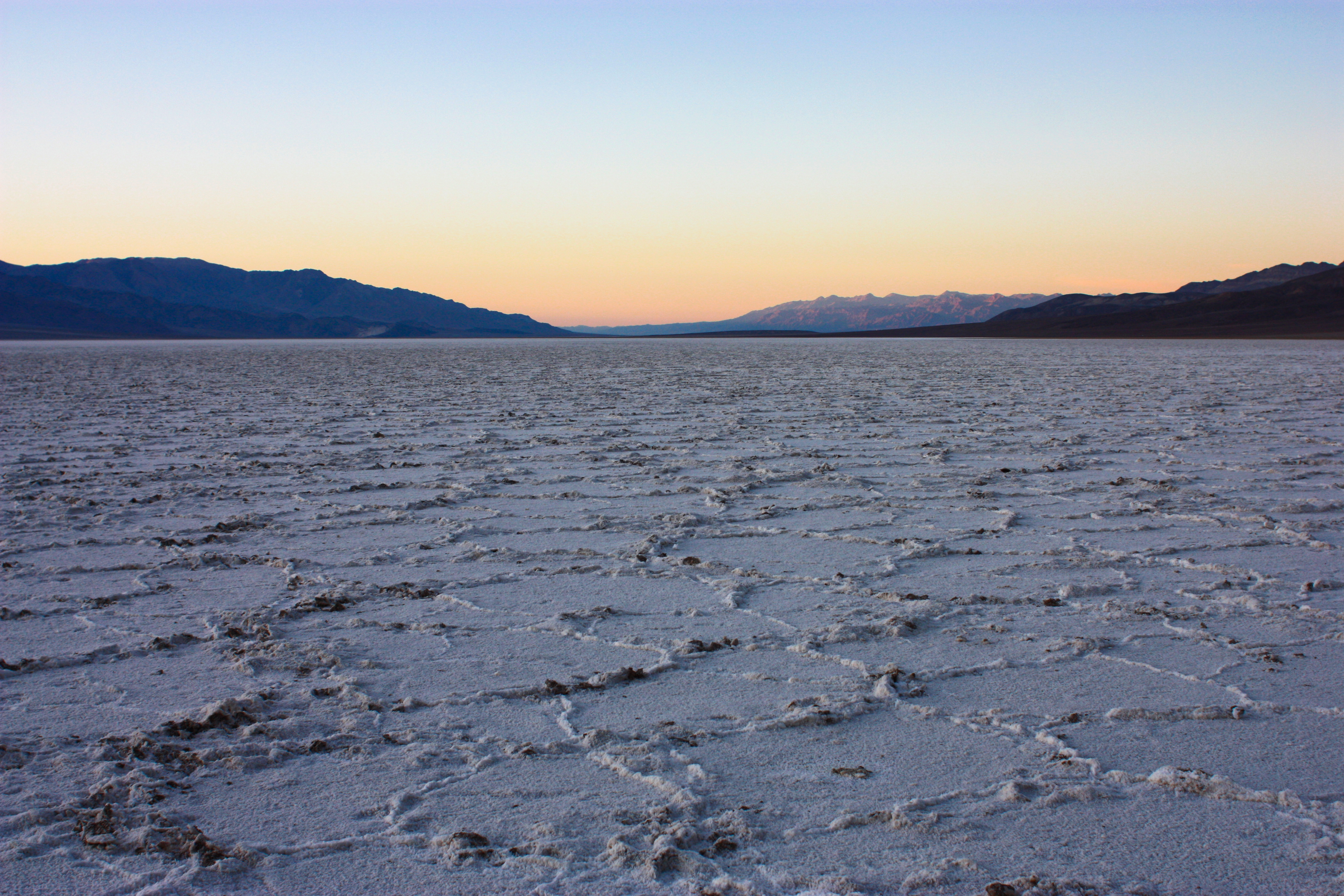
Salts left behind by Lake Manly, in Badwater Basin

=== Water composition ===
As an endorheic lake, Lake Manly was naturally a saltwater lake. The waters would have had less saline at highstand than during growth and regression stages. Further, given that most water inflow occurred from the south, waters probably were less saline there. During the dry period before the last lake stage, salt accumulated at a rate of 1.7 millimeters per year (0.067 in/year). Salinity did not exceed 10,000 ppm and sometimes did not even reach 3,000 ppm, considering data taken from ostracods.

The composition of lake deposits suggests that calcium-rich springs associated with a crustal magma chamber in the southern Death Valley contributed sizable quantities of water to the lake; this magma chamber is also correlated to a 700,000 years old cinder cone in southern Death Valley.

140,000 and 135,000 years before present, Panamint Valley drained relatively alkaline waters into Lake Manly. This composition is also supported by the presence of alkali-liking ostracods in lake deposits, and by patterns of erosion on lake deposits.

== Climate ==
The mean annual temperature of Death Valley is about 26 °C (79 °F), due in part to its relatively low elevation; July temperatures exceed 38 °C (100 °F) on average. Based on plant data, summer temperatures at Lake Manly during the Pleistocene were about 6–8 °C (11–14 °F) lower than present day; Yucca whipplei was found at altitudes too cold for its development, suggesting that middle altitudes winters were milder 12,000–10,000 years ago. Winter water temperatures may have dropped below 10 °C (50 °F) however, occasionally falling below 0 °C (32 °F) with a maxima of 19–30 °C (66–86 °F) during the latest lake stage. The "Blackwelder" stage had higher maximum temperatures. Maximum temperatures were depressed by 4–15 °C (7.2–27.0 °F) during summers in the last highstand; Blackwelder highstand temperatures reached 25–32 °C (77–90 °F), however.

Death Valley has a dry climate, owing to the rain shadow formed by the Panamint Range and the Sierra Nevada, which is enhanced by the relative depth of the valley. Thus less than 50 millimeters (2.0 in) precipitation fall every year, and large year-to-year variations are observed. Much of this rainfall is transported by winter storms, although summer thunderstorms and tropical storms also contribute. The depression of the forest line in Death Valley suggests that during the Pleistocene, rainfall was three or four times what it is today. Based on hydrological modelling, a temperature drop of about 10 °C (18 °F) and 2.5 times today's precipitation would be needed to recreate the last highstand of Lake Manly.

Lake Manly was probably windier than present-day Death Valley, as present day winds would not be strong enough to push some of the rocks that were moved along Lake Manly's shores; wind speeds of over 31 m/s (69 mph) would be needed. Later research reduced this requirement to about 14–27 m/s (31–60 mph), which is consistent with estimated present day wind speeds in Death Valley. The topography of the valley would have generated northerly winds over Lake Manly, but strong southwesterly winds also contributed to the formation of beach deposits.

Wave heights have been estimated at about 76–94 centimeters (2 ft 6 in – 3 ft 1 in) with heights of about 1.35–2.22 meters (4 ft 5 in – 7 ft 3 in) needed to transport beach material, enough to form backwash and swash. Wave activity was most pronounced in the southern and northern parts of Lake Manly.

== Biology ==
Some inferences on the biota of Lake Manly can be made on the basis of analogous lakes such as Mono Lake and Great Salt Lake and on the streams that drain into Death Valley. Shared species are considered evidence not only for the integration of regional river systems, but also for connections with more remote water systems such as the Colorado River. Such a connection to the Colorado River may have occurred through the White River and Las Vegas Valley, through the Amargosa River or an earlier course of the Mojave River into Bristol Lake. Alternatively, migratory birds might have dispersed animals between the watersheds. Species dwelling in groundwater also existed in the lake.

Some tufa deposits were formed by cyanobacteria (blue-green algae), and also charophytes and a foraminiferan, Elphidium. Ostracod species which existed in Lake Manly include Candona caudata, Candona rawsoni, Cyprideis beaconensis, Limnocythere ceriotuberosa, Limnocythere sappaensis and Limnocythere staplini. Stromatolites were active in ponds behind the beaches of Lake Manly.

Species that inhabited the lake probably included the brine fly larvae, brine shrimp and molluscs like Anodonta and Carinifex. Present day endemic aquatic fauna includes amphipods, hemipterans and springtails. The integrated river system may have aided the spread of the spider Saltonia incerta.

Nineteen different species of Tyronia springsnails occur within the Lake Manly system, more specifically in the Owens River and Amargosa River valleys. An early connection between the Amargosa River and the Colorado River may have propagated these animals between the two river systems.

Much research has been done on Death Valley fish, of which about 24 species have been described. Minnows like Agosia and Siphateles as well as the desert pupfish inhabit streams and probably lived in Lake Manly as well. The Lake Manly drainage system facilitated the spread of species of the genera Cyprinodon and Empetrichthys in the region, and of pupfish more generally. After 10,000 years before present this drainage system disappeared and distinct pupfish species evolved. Pupfish may have entered Death Valley through the Owens River, or through an earlier Pliocene river system, probably forming an unified breeding population. The speciation of Cyprinodon nevadensis and Cyprinodon salinus may have occurred in just a few thousand years after the drying of Lake Manly. It is likely that the propagation of pupfish across the whole system took longer than this, as Lake Manly was never simultaneously connected to all three of its source drainages and pupfish would have had to enter the Death Valley system from the Gulf of Mexico over large distances. Cyprinodon has been present in Death Valley since the late Miocene-early Pliocene. Now-extinct Fundulus species existed during the Miocene in Death Valley.

The shores of the lake supported bird populations. Vegetation including sagebrush probably covered mountain slopes, with higher slopes containing juniper, pine, and Utah juniper forests. Forests during the Pleistocene extended down from 610 meters (2,000 ft) altitude; presently only land above 1,910 meters (6,270 ft) is forested. At even lower altitudes shadscale and yucca fossils have been found.

The occurrence of lizards of the genus Uma is associated with paleoriver-paleolake systems, which tend to favor their propagation. One clade of Uma scoparia is associated with the Lake Manly system. The California vole was likewise propagated between the Mojave River and Amargosa River systems by the Lake Manly drainage.

Freshwater lakes would also be suitable habitats for the establishment of humans. Various potentially man-made tools were found on Manly Terrace. These include scrapers, gravers and lesser numbers of drills and blades. This human activity probably occurred at the time of the last highstand of Lake Manly, during the Wisconsin glaciation. The human origin of these artifacts has been contested however, because they appear to resemble natural rocks from the area.

== Chronology ==
Lake Manly existed during the late Pleistocene, and was at first considered to be an early Wisconsin glaciation (Tahoe stage) phenomenon. Originally, it was believed that Lake Manly did not exist during the Tioga glaciation, and it was assumed that Lake Manly existed in only one stage.

Later evidence, such as drilling core data, indicates two distinct lake stages, one 185,000–128,000 years ago and another 35,000–10,000 years ago. This corresponds to oxygen isotope stage 6 and 2 respectively. Between 120,000 and 60,000 years ago there was no lake in Death Valley, and separate saline lakes existed between 60,000 and 35,000 years ago. Lake formation in Death Valley typically occurs during glacial stages, in particular when the Atlantic meridional overturning circulation is disturbed by icebergs, and lake levels in Lake Manly appear to track the size of the Laurentide Ice Sheet but only very roughly so. Further, last glacial maximum highstands of Lake Manly appear to precede highstands of Lake Lahontan and Lake Bonneville, probably due to a northward shift of the jet stream.

=== Earliest highstands ===
According to sedimentation patterns, a southeastward flowing river occupied northern Death Valley during the late Miocene, and was gone by 3.35 million years ago. This river system started in the Cottonwood Mountains – possibly as far as Last Chance Range and Owens Valley – and passed through northern Death Valley into the Amargosa Valley, possibly into the Colorado River.

A Pliocene stage is documented in southern Death Valley, and a lake in the Furnace Creek basin of northern Death Valley reached a highstand 3.35 million years ago; a number of tephra layers provide controls on the ages of this lake. Thus, a very early lake existed in northern Death Valley between 3.5 and 1.7 million years ago, or between 3.4 and <3 million years ago, probably coinciding with the beginning development of a glacial climate in North America at that time. Such a lake was connected with the Owens Valley because Coso volcanic field tuffs have been found in Death Valley. The basins occupied by early lakes were probably not the same as those of Lake Manly; tectonic deformation has lifted the Nova basin above the current floor of Death Valley. This lake was most likely of limited extent. The 1.7–1.9-million-year-old Glass Mountain tuffs formed deposits in such early lakes.

In the early and middle Pleistocene, the Amargosa River and Mojave River ended in terminal lakes before reaching Death Valley, and it is not clear that the Owens River could overflow from Panamint Valley into Death Valley. Tephra interbedded with lake deposits indicates that a pre-Lake Manly existed between 1.2–0.8 million and 665,000 years before present. Simultaneous highstands in other Great Basin lakes such as Lake Bonneville may be correlated with this lake stage, which occurred during marine isotope stage 16. It is not clear whether this was one lake or several disconnected lakes. Other old lake stands may have occurred 510,000 years ago and 216,000–194,000 years before present; shorelines from the latter stand are presently at altitudes of 73–96 meters (240–315 ft). The existence of Lake Manly 1,000,000–600,000 years ago is possible but questionable; yet older lake formations have been variously dated between 3.7 and 0.77 million years ago. These formations are known as "Lake Manly phase 1" or "Lake Zabriskie".

=== Blackwelder highstand ===
The highest shoreline at elevations of 90–100 meters (300–330 ft) has been named Blackwelder stand, after a researcher who first examined the fossil shorelines. It appears to belong to the first (Illinoian) stage of the lake, but was originally thought to belong to the second (Wisconsinian) stage, during oxygen isotope stage 6, and lasted about 70,000 years. Additional shorelines associated with this highstand are found at elevations of 47–90 metres (154–295 ft). Uranium-thorium dating has linked this shoreline to the older highstand, about 186,000–120,000 years before present; an alternative proposal linking the Blackwelder stand with a wet period in Lake Searles 1.3–1 million years ago conflicts with other dates. The uranium-thorium dates and others of the Blackwelder stand are not beyond all doubts, however. A brief dry period may have occurred 148,000 years ago, possibly caused by a temporary damming of the Amargosa River. Ostracod data indicates two separate highstands 154,500–149,000 and 122,000–120,000 years ago. According to drill cores, the water level began to rise 200,600 ± 3,200 years ago.

Depending on the rate of tectonic sinking, the lake at the early stage was 175 meters (574 ft) and up to 335 meters (1,099 ft) deep if faulting is ignored. The Sperry terrace in Amargosa Canyon appears to be of the same general age as the Blackwelder highstand. During this time the Amargosa River and Owens River reached Lake Manly. Ostracod fossils from this lake stage suggest that the lake's conditions varied during this timespan.

This shoreline is found at Mormon Point, Shoreline Butte and elsewhere in the northern Death Valley but not in the south; one theory states that shorelines at elevations of 180 meters (590 ft) (Salt Spring and Saddle Springs) and 340 meters (1,120 ft) (Mesquite Spring at Soda Lake) are Blackwelder shorelines that were offset by tectonic deformation at a geologically reasonable rate of 2 millimeters per year (0.079 in/year). Such would imply that Soda Lake and Silver Lake during the Blackwelder stand were connected with Lake Manly; this theory is known as "mega Lake Manly". Such an expansion would have occurred whenever the lake levels rose above 178 meters (584 ft) above sea level and thus could flow south across Salt Spring Hills; the enlargement of the lake surface that resulted would have increased evaporation and stabilized lake levels. There is no clear cut evidence that these shorelines are of the same age as the Blackwelder shoreline, although they are of similar appearance. The spread of pupfish between the Mojave River and Death Valley drainages would also be more likely with such a lake configuration.

There is no indication that Soda Lake playa had a lake during oxygen isotope stage 6, although water currents in a previous lake may have transported sands that are usually only found in ephemeral lakes through a deeper lake. Further, based on dating, shorelines at Salt Spring appear to belong to the later lake stage, and the tectonic deformation required to link the two southern shorelines to the Blackwelder has been deemed implausible, and has not been supported by analysis of the shorelines themselves. A final explanation assumes that during that stage, Lake Manly did not extend into southern Death Valley.

The Blackwelder highstand was probably not stabilized by overflow seeing as the only spillway close to Ludlow is about 595 meters (1,952 ft) high above sea level – considerably higher than the Blackwelder highstand could plausibly be – and the highest shorelines at Shoreline Butte and Lake Mojave are considerably lower. Additionally, the development of stable shorelines does not by default require an overflow, as demonstrated by the Dead Sea and its precursor Lake Lisan.

=== Later lake stages ===
By 130,000–120,000 years ago, Lake Manly had retreated from the Blackwelder highstand, with final desiccation occurring about 127,100 ± 4,300 years ago. A further lake stage may have occurred during oxygen isotope stage 4, but evidence is equivocal. Ostracod fossils dated between 129,000 and 123,000 years ago indicate that Death Valley was wetter than today and supported several hydrological environments, although no lake persisted during the Eemian. Between 54,000 and 50,000 years ago various shallow phases of Lake Manly occurred.

The later lake stage which occurred during the Wisconsin glaciation/Weichselian glaciation was not as large as the Blackwelder lake stage; at first it was suggested that only small lakes occupied Death Valley during that time. The later lake was shallower, with tufas dated at 25,000 and 18,000 years before present having formed at elevations of −22 to −30 meters (−72 to −98 ft). That lake was probably shallow, with estimated depths of 64–78 meters (210–256 ft). Later research indicated that late Lake Manly was even shallower, probably because regional climate conditions favorable to its growth were rarer during the later lake stage than at Blackwelder times, and might have even been split into two separate waterbodies. Further, it may have been dominated more by groundwater discharge. In general, the chronology of this recent lake stage is not very clear.

The Last Glacial Maximum lake had a surface area of about 1,600 square kilometers (620 sq mi). This lake stage had highstands approximately 26,000, 18,000 and 12,000 years before present, which have been named "DVLP-1" ("Death Valley Late Pleistocene lake high-stand"), "DVLP-2" and "DVLP-3" respectively. Some radiocarbon dates have been obtained on this lake, including 12,980 ± 700 and 11,900 ± 200. The recession commenced before 12,970 ± 185 years ago.

=== Present day ===
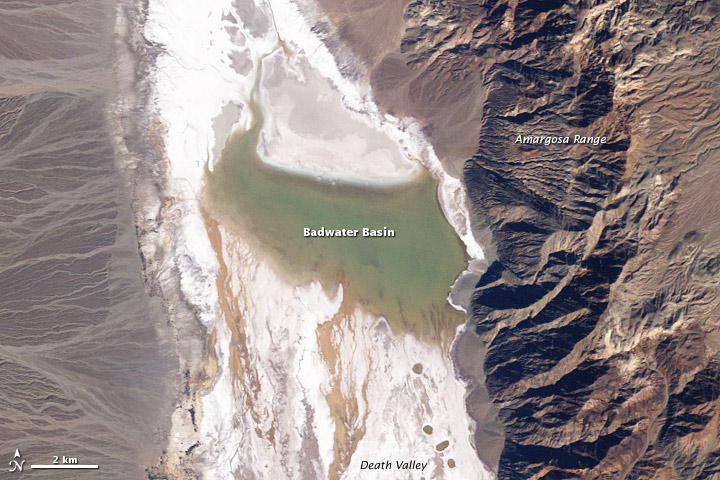
A reformed lake in 2005

By 12,000 years before present, Lake Manly had shrunk to the Badwater basin and was probably only 2 meters (6 ft 7 in) deep. This drying event separated various Cyprinodon populations from each other, triggering the evolution of individual species with restricted distribution. Based on the state of preservation of shoreline deposits (e.g., at Hanaupah Fan), the retreat of the lake was probably much faster than its growth.

The lake had vanished by 10,000 years ago, although some evidence for a Holocene lake has been found. A minor lacustrine period occurred between 5,000 and 2,000 years ago; this lake was larger than Lake Mead and probably existed for less than 100 years. Its shorelines have been found at elevations of −79 to −73 meters (−260 to −240 ft).

Since then, only a pond in Badwater basin remains, and the valley is hot and dry. The rest of the valley floor is filled with mudflats and salt pans. Salt Creek and some springs are the only freshwater present. Floods of the Mojave River are lost before reaching Death Valley. Current evaporation rates and climate conditions do not allow the existence of perennial lakes in Death Valley.

The bulk of present-day water in Death Valley is supplied by groundwater discharge. The Amargosa River is mostly underground, but occasionally it can flood and reach Death Valley. Parts of Death Valley are sometimes flooded during wet weather, causing parts of Lake Manly to reform. Severe flooding in March 2005 resulted in parts of Death Valley becoming submerged. This precipitation event broke records dating back to 1911 and was followed by a major desert bloom. Such lake refillings are usually associated with El Niño events. Hurricane Hilary in 2023 and additional precipitation in 2024 produced 4.9 in (12 cm) precipitation over a period of six months, forming a shallow lake deep enough for kayaking until it was closed in 2024. The flooded area changed over time, due to wind displacing water. From September through November 2025, Death Valley experienced its wettest fall on record as 2.41 in (6.1 cm) fell, which is more than the area typically gets in an entire year. Subsequently, Lake Manly became visible again on December 1, 2025.
