= Tecopa Lake Beds =

Geological formation in California

- Stratigraphic range: Pleistocene
- Type: Geologic formation

Lithology
- Primary: Mudstone

Location
- Region: Mojave Desert, California
- Country: United States

Type section
- Named for: Lake Tecopa (prehistoric)

The Tecopa Lake Beds is a Blancan Pleistocene geologic formation in the Mojave Desert in eastern California. It is in the Tecopa area, east of Death Valley, in southeastern Inyo and northeastern San Bernardino County.

The Lake Tecopa lake beds are the dry lake remnant of the formerly huge Pleistocene age Lake Tecopa, in the present day Amargosa River basin. It preserves fossils of the Quaternary period in the Cenozoic Era.

Among the fossils found in the Tecopa Lake Beds is Capricamelus gettyi, a camelid.

== See also ==
- Lake Manly
- List of fossiliferous stratigraphic units in California
- Natural history of the Mojave Desert
- Paleontology in California
