= Candona sillae =

Scientific classification
- Kingdom: Animalia
- Phylum: Arthropoda
- Clade: Pancrustacea
- Class: Ostracoda
- Order: Podocopida
- Family: Candonidae
- Genus: Candona
- Species: C. sillae

Binomial name
- Candona sillae Karanovic & Lee, 2012

Species of seed shrimp

Candona sillae is a species of ostracod in the family Candonidae., which was first described in 2012 by Ivana Karanovic and Wonchoel Lee. The species epithet, sillae, derives from the name of the ancient kingdom of Silla on the Korean peninsula.

It is a freshwater species found in the quiet streams of Gyeonggi-do, South Korea.
