= Candonopsis =

Scientific classification
- Domain: Eukaryota
- Kingdom: Animalia
- Phylum: Arthropoda
- Class: Ostracoda
- Order: Podocopida
- Family: Candonidae
- Subfamily: Candoninae
- Genus: Candonopsis; Vavra, 1891

Synonyms
- Abcandona Karanovic, 2004; Abcandonopsis Karanovic, 2004

Genus of seed shrimps

Candonopsis is a genus of ostracod in the family Candonidae. The genus has a cosmopolitan distribution.

== Taxonomy ==
The following species are recognised in the genus Candonopsis:

- †Candonopsis alagoensis Tomé, Lima Filho & Neumann, 2014
- Candonopsis aula Karanovic, 2004
- †Candonopsis carthaginensis Trabelsi et al., 2020
- Candonopsis dani Karanovic & Marmonier, 2002
- Candonopsis dedeckkeri Karanovic, 2007
- Candonopsis inaffecta Karanovic, 2007
- Candonopsis indoles Karanovic, 2004
- Candonopsis kimberleyi Karanovic & Marmonier, 2002
- Candonopsis linnaei Karanovic, 2008
- Candonopsis mareza Karanovic & Petkovski, 1999
- Candonopsis murchisoni Karanovic & Marmonier, 2002
- Candonopsis pilbarae Karanovic, 2007
- Candonopsis westaustraliensis Karanovic & Marmonier, 2002
- Candonopsis williami Karanovic & Marmonier, 2002
