= Pseudocandona =

Scientific classification
- Kingdom: Animalia
- Phylum: Arthropoda
- Clade: Pancrustacea
- Class: Ostracoda
- Order: Podocopida
- Family: Candonidae
- Subfamily: Candoninae
- Genus: Pseudocandona; Kaufmann, 1900

Genus of seed shrimps

Pseudocandona is a genus of ostracods in the family Candonidae, containing the following species:

- Pseudocandona agostinhoi Higuti & Martens, 2014
- Pseudocandona atmeta Smith & Kamiya, 2015
- Pseudocandona cillisi Higuti & Martens, 2014
- Pseudocandona claudinae Higuti & Martens, 2014
