= Noonday Camp, California =

Ghost town in Inyo County, California

Noonday Camp, also known as Mill City, Noonday City, and Tecopa, is a ghost town located in the Mojave Desert east of Tecopa in Inyo County, California, United States.

Upper Noonday Camp is located at 35°48′39″N 116°06′15″W, while Lower Noonday Camp is located just south of it at 35°48′01″N 116°06′05″W.

== History ==
The Finley Company built the town in the 1940s support the nearby War Eagle, Noonday, and Columbia lead mines. It was later used by the Anaconda Copper Company, who constructed the lead ore concentration mill during 1947–1948. The town was abandoned in 1972. Compared to other mining ghost towns in the region, Noonday Camp became a ghost town quite recently.

Lead mining ended in 1957 when the U.S. government reached its strategic stockpile goal. The Tecopa and Darwin lead mines - which worked three shifts during the war years - closed.

== Site ==
The remains of the mining operation can be found, collapsed timber structures, foundations, slabs, rock walls, and equipment pads.

=== Lower Noonday Camp ===
Close to the edge of Furnace Creek, Lower Noonday Camp is nearby the Western Talc Mine. The mill's large water tank marks the location. Near the now rapidly deteriorating mill and debris pool is the site of Lower Noonday Camp or "Married Mans Camp". 18 to 20 foundations can be found buried in the brush, along with a small graveyard, slag from the 1870s lead smelter, and a few adobe buildings.

=== Upper Noonday Camp ===
Across the Western Talc Road and up the arroyo is a cliff-side dugout dwelling. A water pipe ran from the well to Upper Noonday Camp or "Single Mans Camp" on Furnace Creek Road, used by Anaconda's employees from 1949 until 1957, and then Western Talc's employees until 1972. It was abandoned, scavenged by the locals, and torn down in 1978.

Foundations of the supervisors and guest houses, several slabs that supported the kitchen, boarding house, and bunkhouses are evident, along with a lot of debris. Prominent is the cinder block vault that held the script currency the miners could use at the company commissary.

=== Talc mine ===
Roads from the site of Noonday Camp go to the Noonday and War Eagle mines. The large white open pit of the talc mine is on Western Talc Road. Talc went out of favor due to its asbestos content. Visible from Highway 127 and the Old Spanish Trail are the landmark Tecopa bins, built in 1944. One was for lead, the other talc. The lead ore was trucked to the UP siding at Dunn and shipped to smelters in Utah.

== See also ==
- Ghost towns in Inyo County, California
- History of the Mojave Desert region
