= Physocypria =

Scientific classification
- Kingdom: Animalia
- Phylum: Arthropoda
- Clade: Pancrustacea
- Class: Ostracoda
- Order: Podocopida
- Family: Candonidae
- Genus: Physocypria; Vávra, 1897

Genus of crustaceans

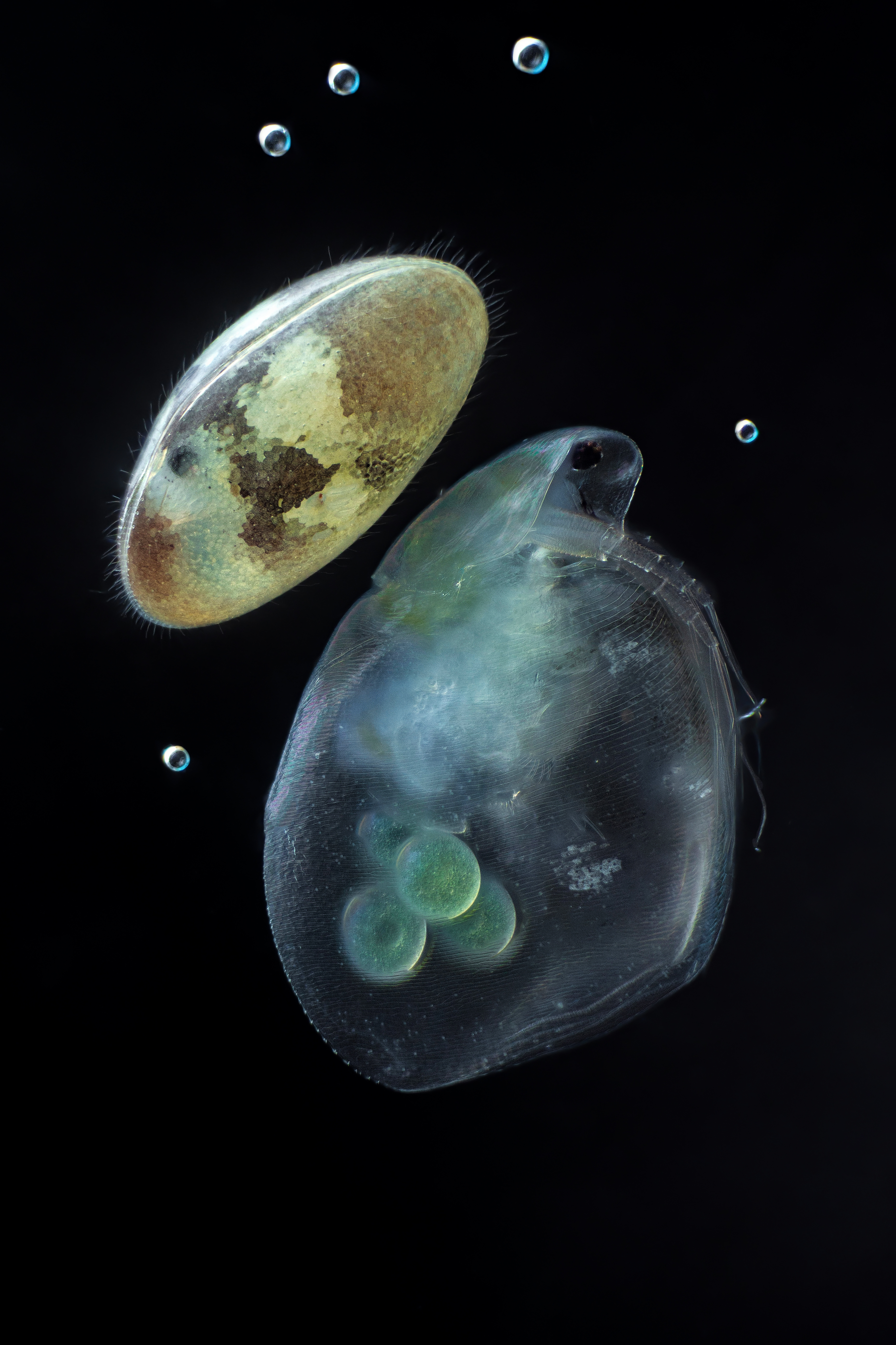

Physocypria is a genus of ostracods belonging to the family Candonidae. The species of this genus are found in Europe, Africa, south-eastern Asia and North America.

== Taxonomy ==
The following species are recognised in the genus Physocypria:

- Physocypria bullata Vávra, 1897
- Physocypria globula Furtos, 1933
- Physocypria pustulosa (Sharpe, 1897)
- Physocypria schubarti Farkas, 1958
