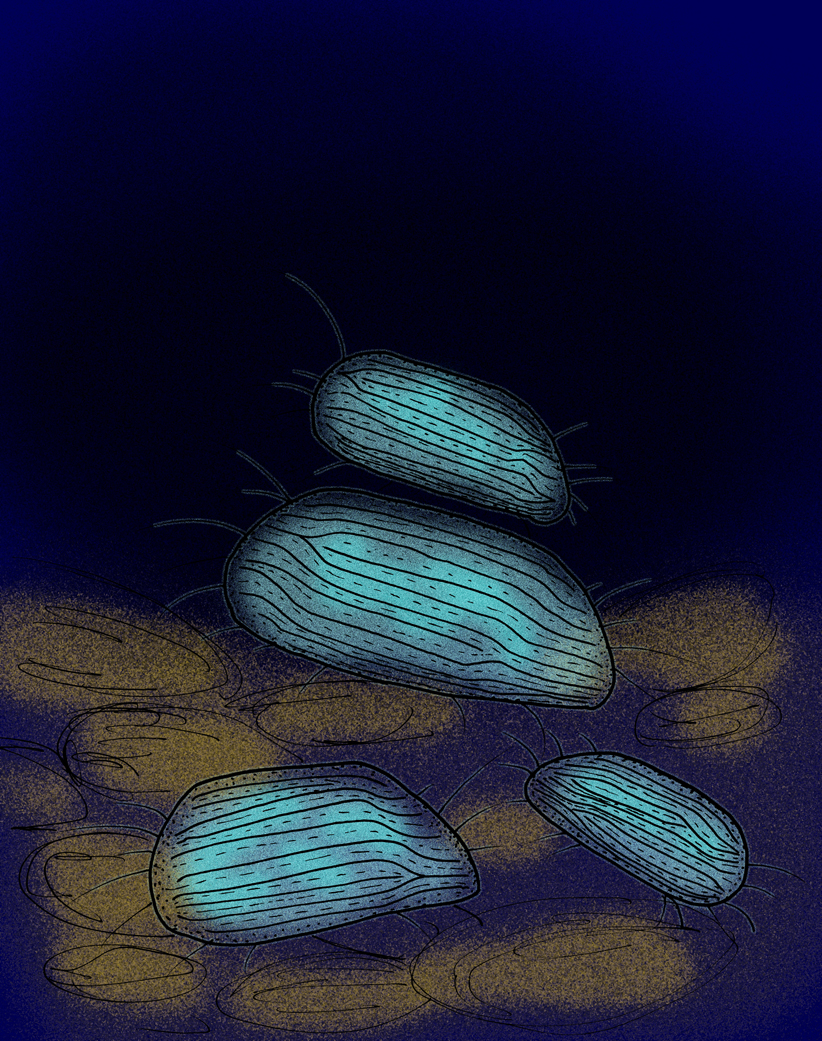
- Artist's restoration

Conservation status
- Critically Endangered (IUCN 3.1)

Scientific classification
- Kingdom: Animalia
- Phylum: Arthropoda
- Class: Ostracoda
- Order: Podocopida
- Family: Candonidae
- Genus: Namibcypris; Martens, 1992
- Species: N. costata

Binomial name
- Namibcypris costata Martens, 1992

= Namibcypris =

Genus of seed shrimps

Namibcypris costata is a critically endangered species of ostracod crustaceans in the family Candonidae, possibly endemic to the southern Kaokoveld in northern Namibia. It is the only species in the genus Namibcypris.
