= Areacandona =

Scientific classification
- Kingdom: Animalia
- Phylum: Arthropoda
- Clade: Pancrustacea
- Class: Ostracoda
- Order: Podocopida
- Family: Candonidae
- Subfamily: Candoninae
- Genus: Areacandona; Karanovic, 2005

Genus of ostracods

Areacandona is a genus of ostracods belonging to the family Candonidae.

== Taxonomy ==
The following species are recognised in the genus Areacandona:

- Areacandona akatallele Karanovic, 2007
- Areacandona ake Karanovic, 2007
- Areacandona arteria Karanovic, 2007
- Areacandona astrepte Karanovic, 2007
- Areacandona atomus Karanovic, 2007
- Areacandona bluffi Karanovic, 2007
- Areacandona brookanthana Karanovic, 2007
- Areacandona cellulosa Karanovic, 2007
- Areacandona clementia Karanovic, 2007
- Areacandona cognata Karanovic, 2007
- Areacandona cylindrata Karanovic, 2007
- Areacandona dec Karanovic, 2007
- Areacandona fortescueiensis Karanovic, 2007
- Areacandona incogitata Karanovic, 2007
- Areacandona iuno Karanovic, 2007
- Areacandona jessicae Karanovic, 2007
- Areacandona korallion Karanovic, 2007
- Areacandona krypte Karanovic, 2007
- Areacandona lepte Karanovic, 2007
- Areacandona mulgae Karanovic, 2005
- Areacandona namuldi Karanovic, 2007
- Areacandona newmani (Karanovic, 2005)
- Areacandona novitas (Karanovic, 2005)
- Areacandona qusilepte Karanovic, 2007
- Areacandona scanloni Karanovic, 2007
- Areacandona stefani Karanovic, 2007
- Areacandona triangulum Karanovic, 2007
- Areacandona undulata Karanovic, 2007
- Areacandona weelumurrae Karanovic, 2007
- Areacandona yuleae Karanovic, 2007
