= Neocandona =

Scientific classification
- Kingdom: Animalia
- Phylum: Arthropoda
- Clade: Pancrustacea
- Class: Ostracoda
- Order: Podocopida
- Family: Candonidae
- Genus: Neocandona; Karanovic, 2005

Genus of crustaceans

Neocandona is a genus of ostracods belonging to the family Candonidae.

Species:

- Neocandona helunga Hu & Tao, 2008
- Neocandona wangshiehi Hu & Tao, 2008
- Neocandona wanwuia Hu & Tao, 2008
- Neocandona yufuiia Hu & Tao, 2008
