= Cyclocypris =

Scientific classification
- Domain: Eukaryota
- Kingdom: Animalia
- Phylum: Arthropoda
- Class: Ostracoda
- Order: Podocopida
- Family: Candonidae
- Subfamily: Cyclocypridinae
- Genus: Cyclocypris; Brady & Norman, 1889

Genus of seed shrimps

Cyclocypris is a genus of ostracods in the family Candonidae. The genus has a cosmopolitan distribution.

== Taxonomy ==
The following species are recognised in the genus Cyclocypris:

- †Cyclocypris eaglespringsensis Swain, 1964
- Cyclocypris globosa (Sars, 1863)
- Cyclocypris ovum (Jurine, 1820)
- †Cyclocypris trapezoidalis Swain, 1964
