= Fabaeformiscandona aemonae =

Conservation status
- Vulnerable (IUCN 2.3)

Scientific classification
- Kingdom: Animalia
- Phylum: Arthropoda
- Clade: Pancrustacea
- Class: Ostracoda
- Order: Podocopida
- Family: Candonidae
- Genus: Fabaeformiscandona
- Species: F. aemonae

Binomial name
- Fabaeformiscandona aemonae (Klie, 1935)

Synonyms
- Pseudocandona aemonae (Klie, 1935)

Species of seed shrimp

Fabaeformiscandona aemonae is a species of ostracod crustacean in the Candonidae family. It is endemic to Slovenia.
