= Dublin Hills =

Mountain range in Inyo County, California, United States

- Location within California

Highest point
- Elevation: 769 m (2,523 ft)

Geography
- Country: United States
- State: California
- District: Inyo County
- Range coordinates: 35°57′24.864″N 116°18′47.103″W
- Topo map: USGS Shoshone

The Dublin Hills are a mountain range in Inyo County, California. The highest point in the Dublin Hills is 2,523 feet.

The Dublin Hills are in a desert region of California which is close to the town of Shoshone, California. The Dublin Gulch leads from the Dublin Hills to Shoshone.

To the south of the Dublin Hills is the town of Tecopa, which is home to 150 people. From Tecopa, one can reach the Dublin Hills by taking the Old Spanish Trail Highway and then turning right on CA 127, which runs parallel with the Hills to Shoshone.
