= Tecopa (Paiute leader) =

Native American chief (c. 1815–1904)

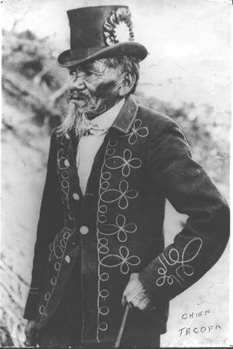
Tecopa, very early 1900s.

Tecopa (c. 1815–1904) was a Native American leader; his name means 'wildcat'. Tecopa was a leader of the Southern Nevada tribe of the Paiute in the Ash Meadows and Pahrump areas. In the 1840s, Tecopa and his warriors engaged the expedition of Kit Carson and John C. Fremont in a three-day battle at Resting Springs. Later on in life, Tecopa tried to maintain peaceful relations with white settlers in the region and was known as a peacemaker. Tecopa usually wore a bright red band suit with gold braid and a silk top hat. Whenever these clothes wore out they were replaced by the local white miners out of gratitude for Tecopa's help in maintaining peaceful relations with the Paiute.

Tecopa is buried with his son and grandson at the Chief Tecopa Cemetery in Pahrump Valley, Nevada.

The census-designated place of Tecopa, California was named after Tecopa by J. B. Osbourne who was the operator of a mining camp at the location.

In November 1971, Nevada Governor Mike O'Callaghan called Tecopa a leader of vision and courage and dedicated a state memorial to him at the Chief's gravesite. 15 acres (61,000 m^{2}) of land was deeded to Nye County and became Tecopa Park.
