= Lake Tecopa =

Lake in California, USA

Coordinates: 35°52′30″N 116°15′00″W

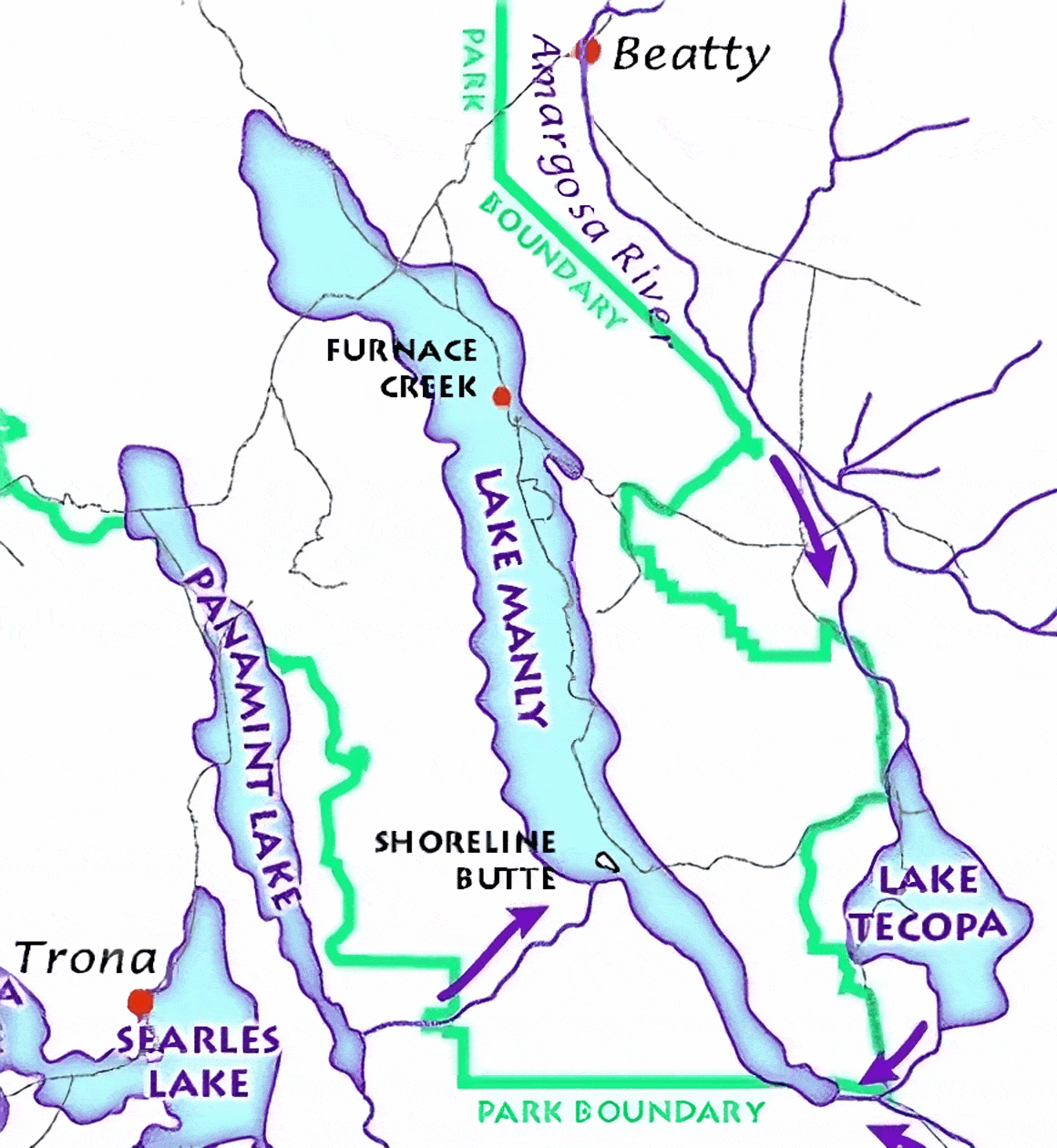
Reconstruction of Amargosa River lakes in the Pleistocene

Lake Tecopa is a former lake in Inyo County, southern California. It developed during the Miocene and the Pleistocene within a tectonic basin close to the border with Nevada. Fed by the Amargosa River and some neighbouring washes, it eventually culminated to a surface area of 235 square kilometres (91 sq mi) around 186,000 years ago and left sediments. Afterwards, the Amargosa River cut a gorge out of the lake and into Death Valley with its Lake Manly, draining the lake. The present-day towns of Shoshone, California and Tecopa, California lie within the basin of the former lake.

== Hydrology ==
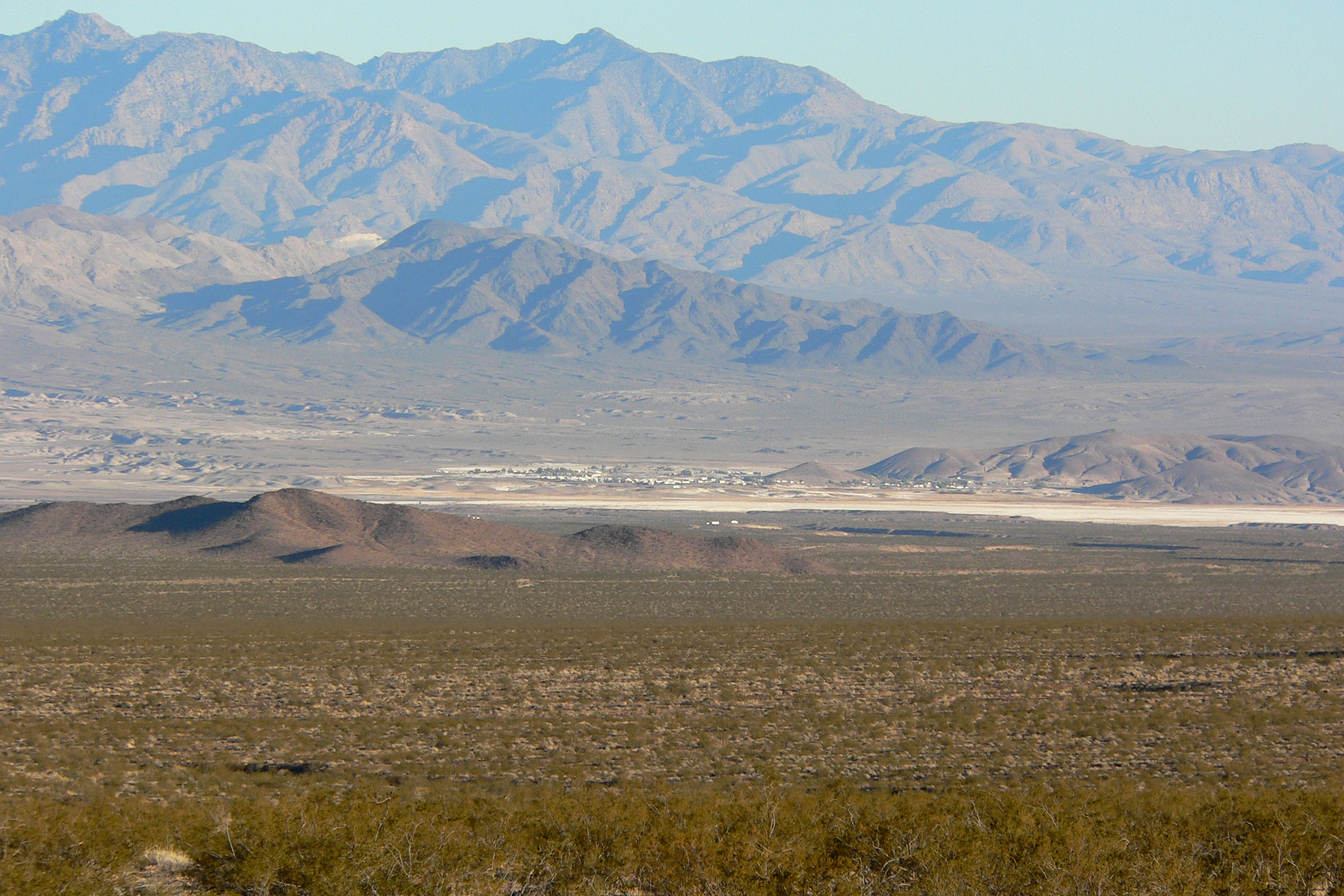
View from the Greenwater Valley over Tecopa CA to the Kingston Range. The terrain in the middle part of the image was formerly covered by Lake Tecopa

Lake Tecopa occupied the Tecopa Valley, a pear-shaped valley east of southern Death Valley, in Inyo County, California. The cities of Barstow, California and Las Vegas, Nevada lie close to the lake basin. The lake itself had a roughly triangular shape with a northern, a southwestern and a southeastern corner, and at its highstand it covered about 235 square kilometres (91 sq mi). Outcrops of lake sediments occupy a length of 22.5 kilometres (14.0 mi) along the Amargosa River and are 17.7 kilometres (11.0 mi) wide at their broadest. Its southern margin is not clear, given that the height of the sill to the China Ranch basin is undetermined. Several islands existed in Lake Tecopa. Of these, the largest was close to Tecopa, California, and two smaller ones were north of Shoshone, California. The shores of the lake featured marshes and deltas where Amargosa River or spring water entered the lake, as well as freshwater ponds where springs and streams flowed into Lake Tecopa.

At the time of the Bishop Tuff eruption, Lake Tecopa was about 100 metres (330 ft) deep. The waters of the lake were salty and had a high pH, inducing precipitation of calcite in the northern part of the lake where the Amargosa River flowed into it. There is some indication that the centre of the lake was much more saline than its shores. Salt lakes generally form when a lake has no outlet, so evaporation concentrates salts in the lake water until the lake contains saltwater.

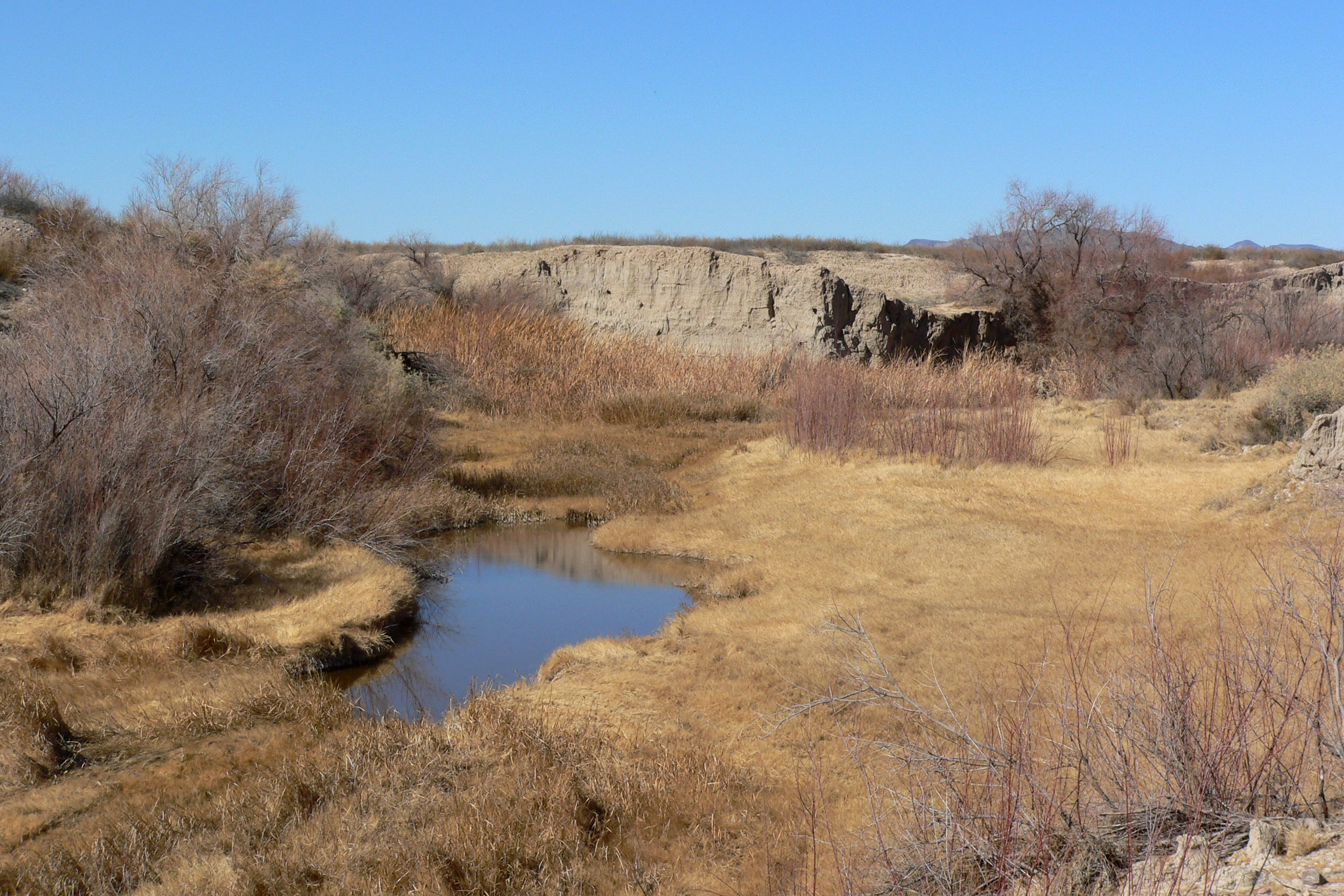
The Amargosa River at present-day Tecopa CA

The Amargosa River flowed into Lake Tecopa, which was the river's terminal lake. Most of the water in Lake Tecopa came from the Amargosa River and to a lesser degree from the washes that drain Chicago Valley and Greenwater Valley; the total size of its catchment was about 8,300 square kilometres (3,200 sq mi) and most of its water originated in Paiute Mesa, Shoshone Mountains, Timber Mountains and Yucca Mountains.

The catchment of the Amargosa River above Tecopa, California is presently about 8,000 square kilometres (3,100 sq mi). Later, after Lake Tecopa had disappeared, the river reached Death Valley and its Lake Manly, dramatically increasing the supply of water to the latter. Presently, the river is largely ephemeral except where it is fed by springs.

== Geography ==
The former lake basin is surrounded by various hills and mountain ranges, formed by rocks of Neoproterozoic to Tertiary age. Clockwise from north they are the Resting Spring Range, the Nopah Range, the Sperry Hills, the Ibex Hills, the Greenwater Valley and the Dublin Hills; together they enclose an area of about 500 square kilometres (190 sq mi). The region belongs to the Basin and Range Province of the western United States, where short ranges of mountains lie between plains. This geology consists of normal faults which separate grabens from horsts. It was affected by extensive tectonic activity in the past and may be still active in the present.

Presently, the towns of Shoshone, California, Tecopa Hot Springs, California and Tecopa, California lie within the former bed of Lake Tecopa. California State Route 127 and California State Route 178 cross the lake basin from southwest to north and from west to east, respectively, while the Furnace Creek Road traverses it from northwest to southeast. The terrain of the region is characterized by badlands and rugged mountains with little vegetation away from springs. A number of springs form oases in the area, including the locations of the three towns.

=== Climate ===
Presently, the area of Lake Tecopa is a hot, dry desert with most precipitation occurring during summer. In Shoshone, California average temperatures are 19.5 °C (67.1 °F) and often exceed 45 °C (113 °F), with about 70 millimetres per year (2.8 in/year) of rainfall. Under present-day climates, evaporation is too high and precipitation too low to allow the formation of lakes in the area. 180,000 years before present, precipitation increased to 200–250 millimetres per year (7.9–9.8 in/year) and average temperatures decreased by 10.5 °C (50.9 °F), lifting the regional water tables.

== Sediments ==
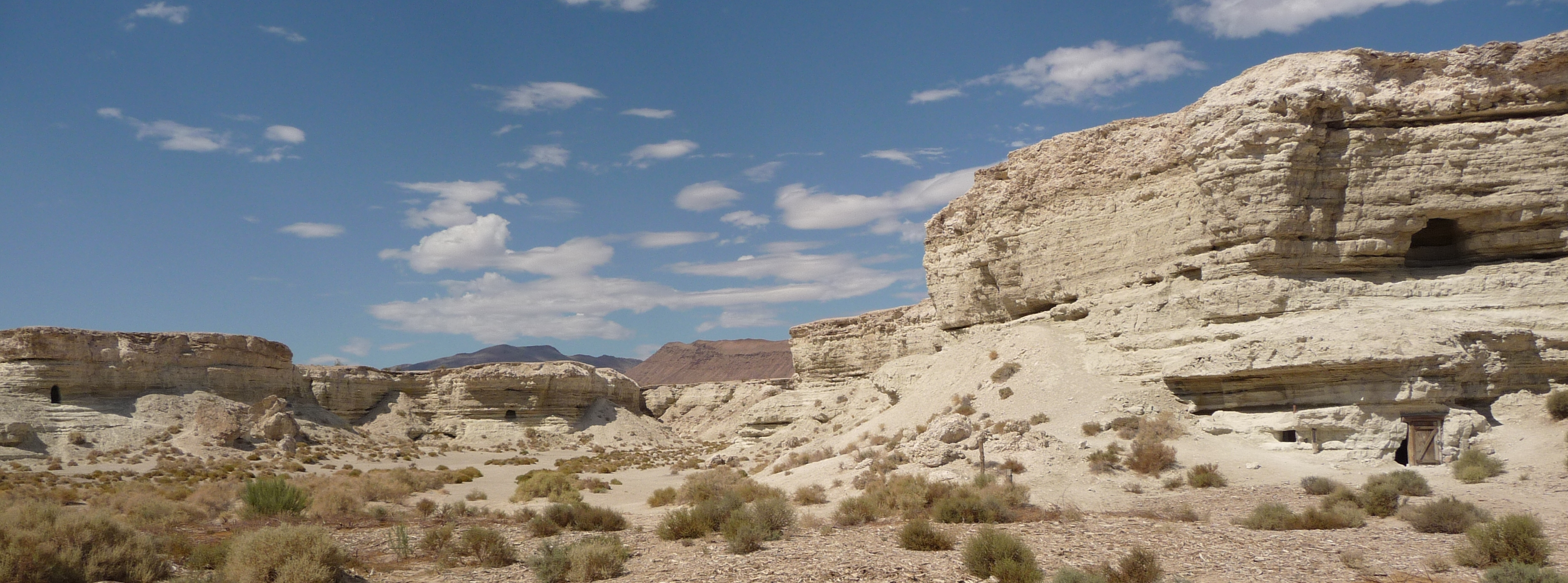
Lake Tecopa - Great Depression era squatter dwellings in lakebed sediments

Various sediments were emplaced in the lake, including adularia, clay, gravel and zeolites. Some of these formed when ash or sediments were progressively altered. The sediments take the form of calcareous, sandy, silty material or mudstone. The sediments have undergone increasing amounts of diagenesis the closer they are to the basin center. Among the minerals found at various sites are calcite, gaylussite, halite and sepiolite.

After the lake was breached, these deposits were deeply eroded and exposed, showing thicknesses exceeding 70 metres (230 ft). The sediments of Lake Tecopa have been heavily researched, e.g. whether similar deposits on Mars would be remotely detectable. Mining for bentonite and pumicite took place from the 1920s to the 1950s.

Tufa deposits are found within the lake and partly embedded in its sediments; they were generated from carbonate precipitation within the lake, a process facilitated by the physical properties of the lake water. Many of these tufa deposits occur where fault-controlled springs discharged water into the lake.

Several tephra layers have been identified, including the 2.003 million years old Huckleberry Ridge Tuff, the 706,000 years old Bishop Tuff and the 602,000 years old Lava Creek Tuff as well as the 2, 1.2-0.8 million years old Glass Mountain tuffs. They form tuff layers which are very conspicuous in the lake sediments.

=== Biology ===
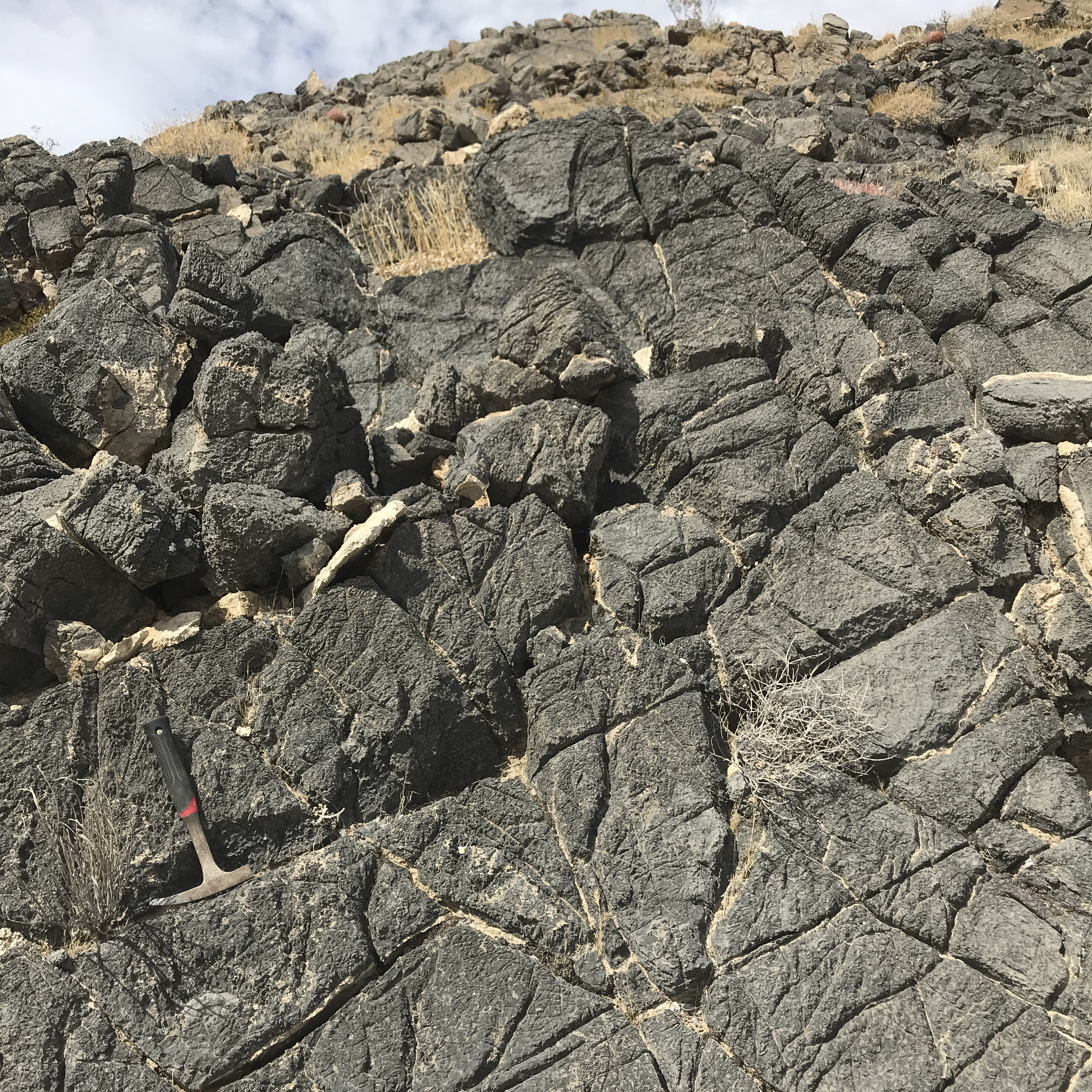
Limestone cliff in Nopah Range. There are deposits of fossils of aquatic creatures that lived in Lake Tecopa

A number of fossils were discovered in the sediments, including chara, diatoms, ostracods, snails and vertebrates. Flamingos lived around the lake. Among mammals are Camelops, Equus, mammoth and muskrat. Footprints have been observed at the edges of the lake basin.

Arcellacea and foraminifera have been found in lake sediments, including Bolivina goudkoffi, Centropyxis constricta, Lobatula lobatula and a few other, less widespread species. Foraminifera are mostly oceanic, and since Lake Tecopa was never connected to the ocean, they were most likely transported there by birds.

== History ==
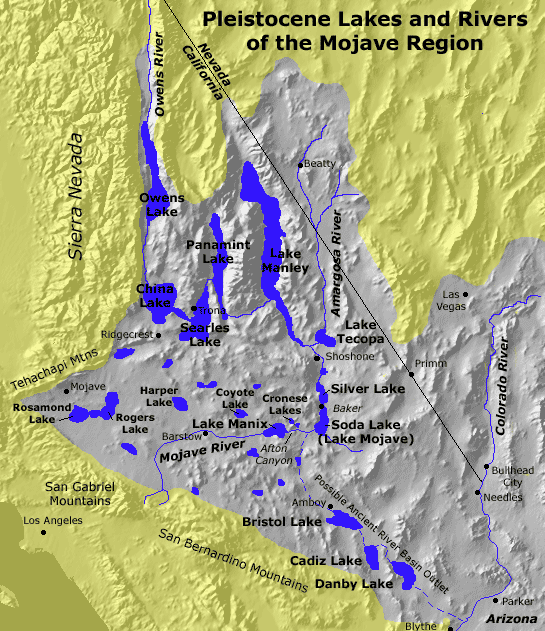
Pleistocene lakes in the region. Note that Lake Tecopa's borders are incorrect

Lake Tecopa existed during the Miocene and Pleistocene. The basin of Lake Tecopa formed between 7 and 11 million years ago, but was then tectonically stable during the Quaternary, although tectonic or magmatic activity may be occurring north of Shoshone. From about 5 million years ago to about 186,000 years before present, the lake developed inside the basin.

Extensive faulting of lake deposits makes it difficult to reconstruct its history. About 2 million years ago, the Amargosa Desert began to drain into Lake Tecopa and a shallow lake existed back then, but between 1.6 and 0.9 million years ago the lake often became a playa. It is unlikely that the lake was ephemeral, however, given the presence of fossils in the lake sediments of foraminifera which do not tolerate such drying. Probably owing to uplift of the Sierra Nevada and expansion of the catchment, water levels at Lake Tecopa increased during the Pleistocene and reached highstands concurrently with other lakes in the Great Basin. The highest shoreline occurs at about 525–550 metres (1,722–1,804 ft) elevation (subsequently tectonically deformed) about 186,000 years before present; it appears to coincide with the Eetza highstand of Lake Lahontan and oxygen isotope stages 8, 7 and 6. Some doubts have been raised about this chronology, however.

At some point after 579,000 years ago, a 8 square kilometres (3.1 sq mi) large slump occurred at the southwestern area of the lake, possibly triggered by an earthquake. Such earthquake activity is also responsible for the formation of seismites within the lake sediments. A number of faults criss-cross the area, several of them follow the borders of the Tecopa basin. Finally, there is evidence of uplift in parts of the southern basin.

About 200,000 - 150,000 years before present, the lake overflowed and disappeared. Several different dates have been given for the time when the lake breached its boundaries, but it likely happened shortly after highstand. A 25 kilometres (16 mi) long gorge was formed by the breaching event, which was triggered either by a river capture-like process or by overflow. Subsidence in Death Valley may be ultimately responsible for the drainage change. It is possible that Lake Tecopa briefly reformed later, due to a temporary blockage of its outflow, and that at times the Amargosa River was blocked upstream from Lake Tecopa.

The existence of the lake beds was described first by Levi F. Noble in 1926. In 1931, Eliot Blackwelder identified these lakebeds as the remnants of what he named Lake Tecopa. The area of the former lake has been the subject of numerous studies comprising various fields of geology but also biology, and an important target for field studies and field trips. Research in the paleoclimatic conditions of the region has received impetus from the Yucca Mountain nuclear waste repository, since the future climate of the region is important in establishing how secure the nuclear waste would be.
