= Broadwell Lake =

Dry lake bed in the Mojave Desert of San Bernardino County, California

- Broadwell Dry Lake
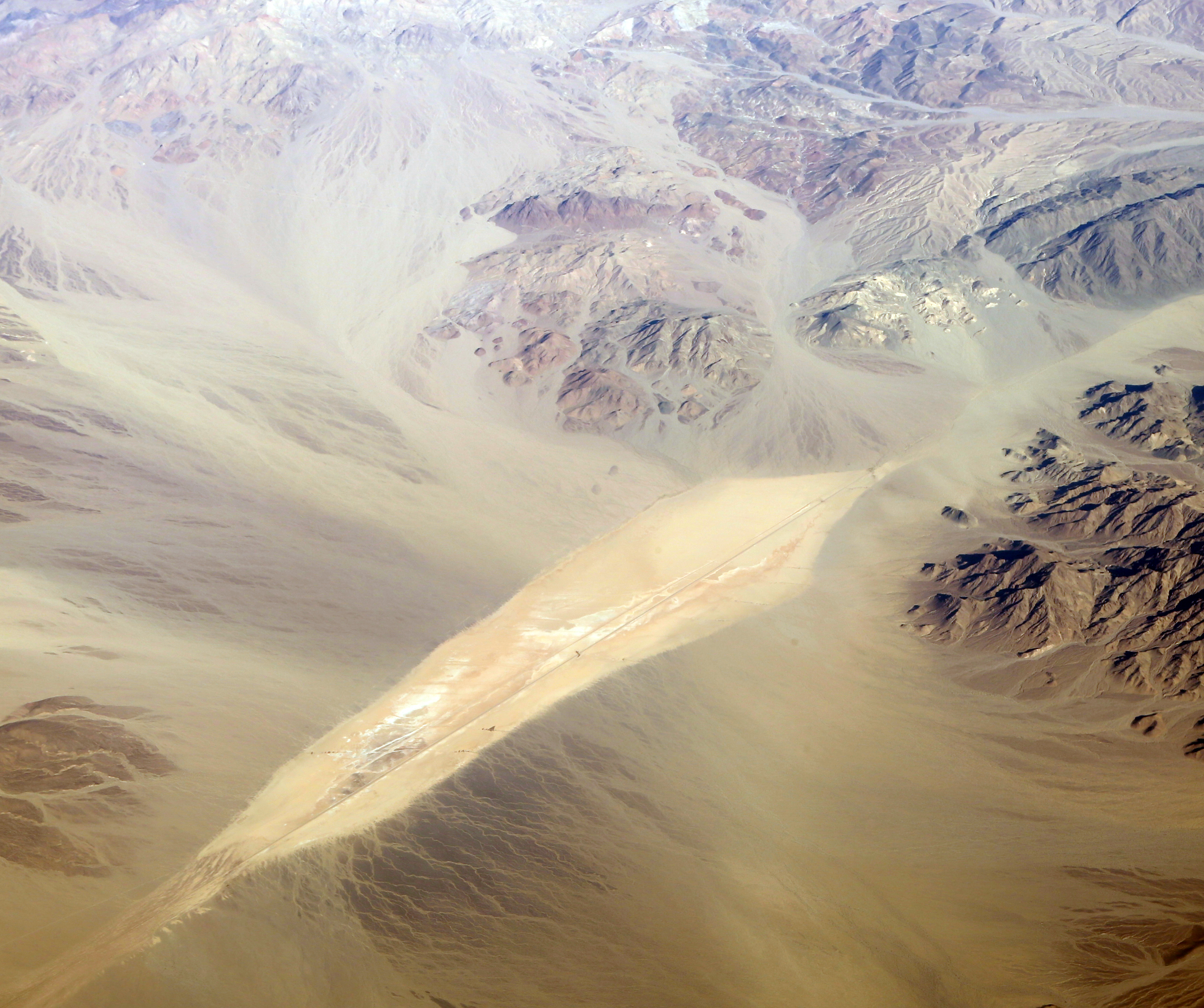
- Aerial view

- Location within California Location within the United States
- Location: Mojave Desert; San Bernardino County, California
- Coordinates: 34.8441°N 116.1864°W
- Lake type: Endorheic basin
- Primary outflows: Terminal (evaporation)
- Basin countries: United States
- Max. length: 7 km (4.3 mi)
- Max. width: 2 km (1.2 mi)
- Shore length^{1}: 17 km (11 mi)
- Surface elevation: 401 m (1,316 ft)
- References: U.S. Geological Survey Geographic Names Information System: Broadwell Lake
- ^{1} Shore length is not a well-defined measure.

Broadwell Lake, sometimes called Broadwell Dry Lake, is a dry lake bed in the Mojave Desert of San Bernardino County, California, 75 km (47 mi) east of Barstow. Flanked by the Cady Mountains and the Bristol Mountains, the lake is approximately 7 km (4.3 mi) long and 2 km (1.2 mi) at its widest point.

== Solar power site ==
BrightSource Energy Inc. had proposed a solar power-generation project near Broadwell Lake, but withdrew that proposal in 2009.

== Wilderness Area ==
The east side of Broadwell Lake is Federally designated Wilderness and lies within the Bureau of Land Management Kelso Dunes Wilderness Area.

== See also ==
- List of lakes in California
