= Candona =

Candona Temporal range: 314.6–0 Ma
- Shells of Candona muelleri

Scientific classification
- Kingdom: Animalia
- Phylum: Arthropoda
- Class: Ostracoda
- Order: Podocopida
- Family: Candonidae
- Tribe: Candonini
- Genus: Candona; Baird, 1845

Genus of seed shrimps

Candona is a genus of ostracods in the family Candonidae. The genus was first described in 1845 by William Baird. The type species is Cypris candida Müller, 1776.

== Taxonomy ==
The following species are recognised in the genus Candona:

- Candona artesensis Swain, 1964 †
- Candona chusanhai Hu & Tao, 2008
- Candona condensa Krömmelbein, 1962 †
- Candona elliptica Furtos, 1933
- Candona gregaria Krömmelbein, 1962 †
- Candona lupinia Hu & Tao, 2008
- Candona neglecta G.O. Sars, 1887
- Candona nobilis (Brady, 1866) Mostafawi, 1989
- Candona parasinuosa Hu & Tao, 2008 †
- Candona patzcuaro Tressler, 1954
- Candona pitangaensis Krömmelbein, 1965 †
- Candona quasiincarum Karanovic & Datry, 2009
- Candona redunca Krömmelbein, 1962 †
- Candona rupestris
- Candona shitsyi Hu & Tao, 2008
- Candona sillae Karanovic & Lee, 2012
- Candona verretensis LeRoy, 1964
