= Typhlocypris =

Scientific classification
- Domain: Eukaryota
- Kingdom: Animalia
- Phylum: Arthropoda
- Class: Ostracoda
- Order: Podocopida
- Family: Candonidae
- Subfamily: Candoninae
- Genus: Typhlocypris; Vejdovský, 1882

Genus of seed shrimps

Typhlocypris is a genus of ostracods, which are a small, bivalved crustaceans. It contains the following species:

- Typhlocypris pescei Karanovic, 2005
- Typhlocypris regisnikolai (Karanovic & Petkovski, 1999)
- Typhlocypris skadari Karanovic, 2005
