= Tecopa, California =

Tecopa
- Unincorporated Community; Census Designated Place
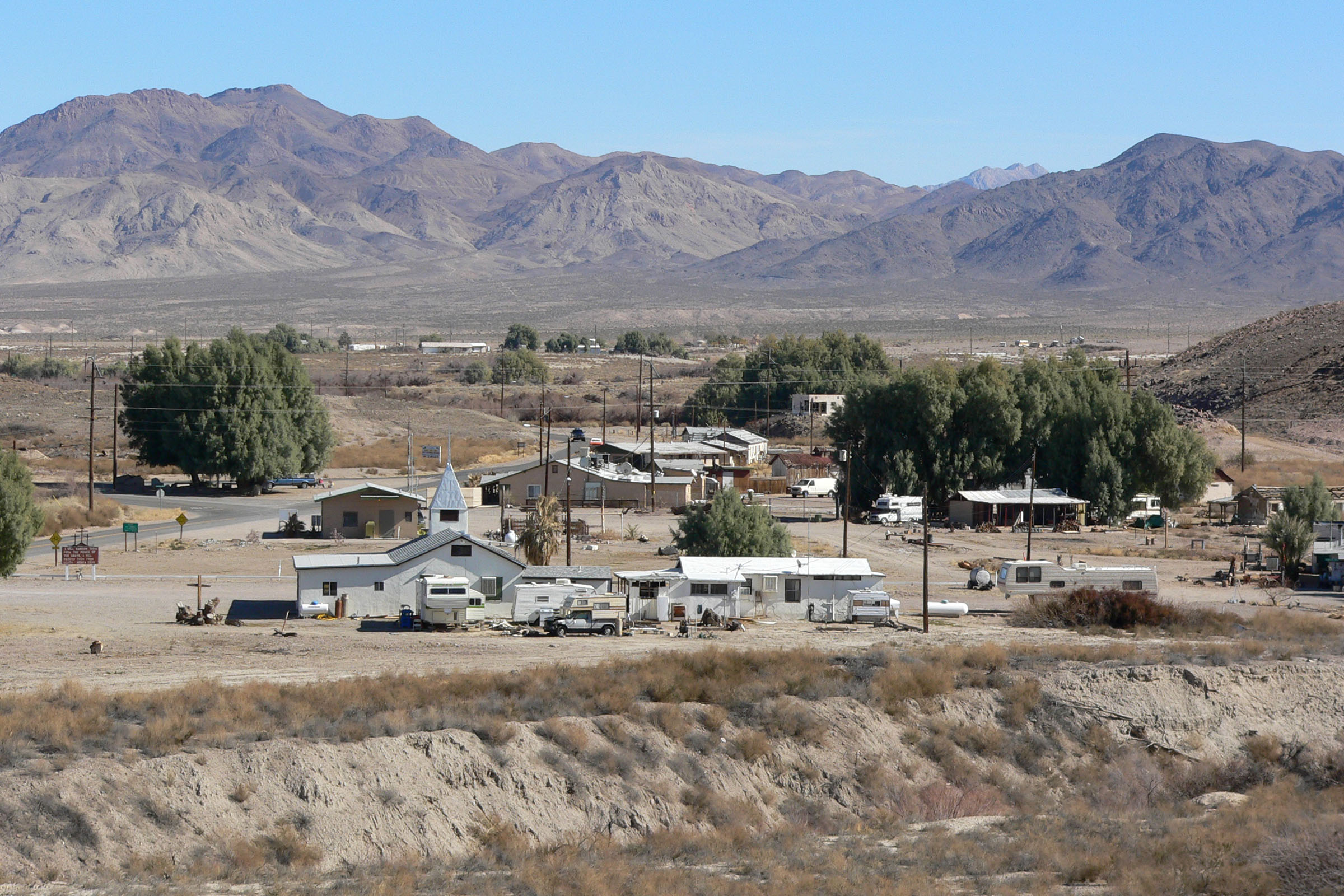
- Tecopa from the southwest

- Location in Inyo County and the state of California

- Location in the United States
- Coordinates: 35°50′54″N 116°13′35″W
- Country: United States
- State: California
- County: Inyo

Area
  - Total: 18.658 sq mi (48.323 km^{2})
  - Land: 18.589 sq mi (48.146 km^{2})
  - Water: 0.068 sq mi (0.177 km^{2}) 0.37%
- Elevation: 1,545 ft (471 m)

Population (2020)
  - Total: 120
  - Density: 6.5/sq mi (2.5/km^{2})
- Time zone: UTC-8 (Pacific (PST))
  - Summer (DST): UTC-7 (PDT)
- ZIP code: 92389
- Area codes: 442/760
- FIPS code: 06-78050
- GNIS feature ID: 2410062

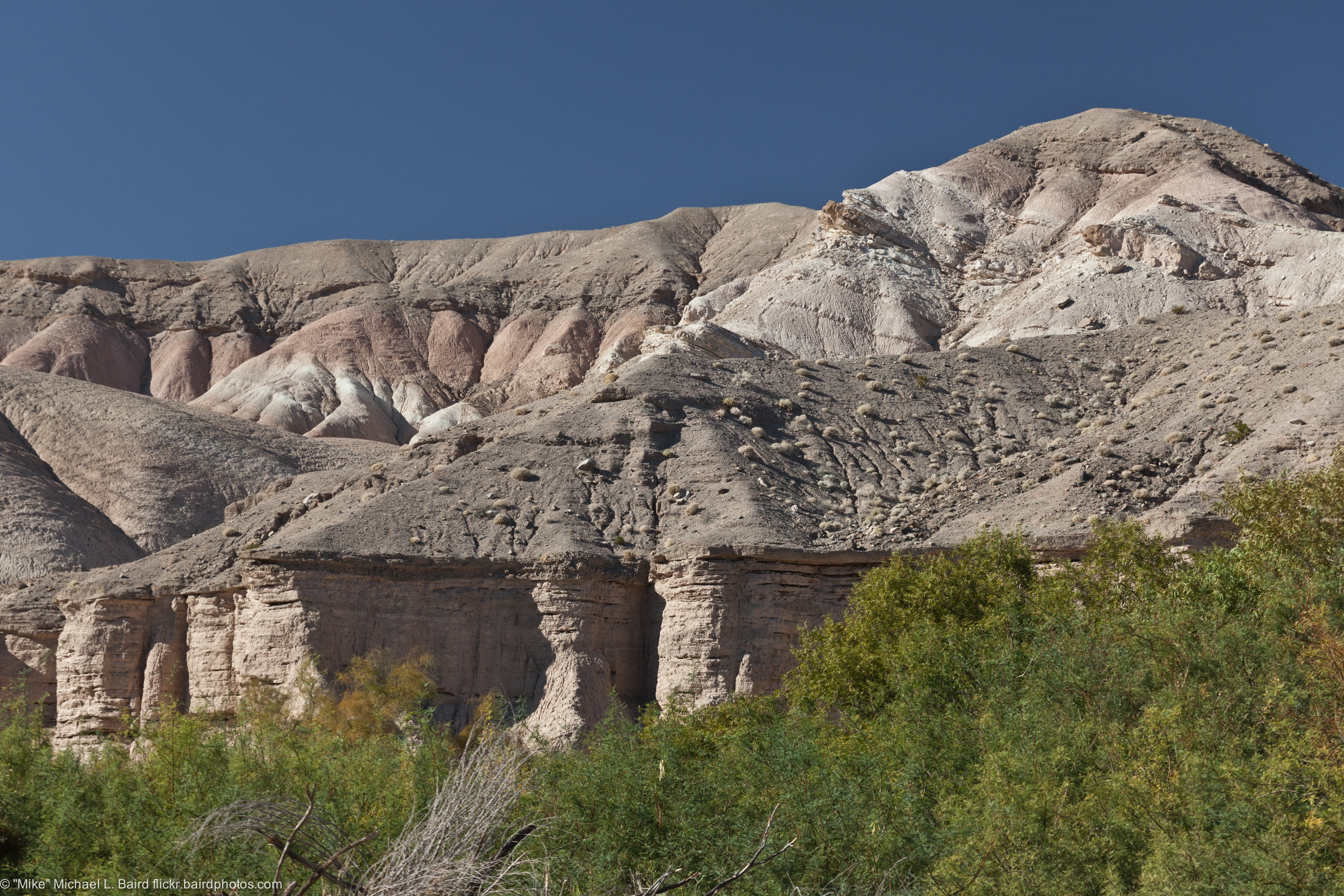
Badlands along the road to the China Ranch date farm, south of Tecopa

Tecopa is a census-designated place (CDP) in the Mojave Desert in southeast Inyo County, California, United States. As of the 2020 census, Tecopa had a population of 120. Originally occupied by the Koso and Chemehuevi Indians, pioneers began populating what would become the CDP in the late 19th century to support nearby mines. It is now better known for the natural hot springs in the northern part of the CDP.

== Regional history ==
The Old Spanish Trail and the later wagon road called the Old Mormon Road or Salt Lake Road, passed from Resting Springs, east of the modern site of Tecopa, seven miles to Willow Creek (fed by Willow Spring within China Ranch Wash on the east bank of the canyon of the Amargosa River (then called Saleratus Creek)), south of Tecopa. In 1859, The Prairie Traveler, a popular handbook for overland travelers at that time described it thus:

The spring is on the left of the road, and flows into Saleratus Creek. Animals must not be allowed to drink the Saleratus water."

There the trail turned to follow the river south to Salt Springs.

China Ranch Wash is named for the Chinese man known as either Quon Sing or Ah Foo, who developed Willow Creek circa 1900 and raised meat and vegetables to sell to the miners.

== History of the community ==
=== Original town ===
In 1875, brothers William D. and Robert D. Brown, had discovered lead and silver ore at what would become the Resting Springs Mining District and began promoting it. They established a townsite, calling it Brownsville, 5 miles (8 km) southeast of Resting Springs near the head of Willow Creek. Kasson, California was nearby. A camp was established at the site as mines were developed at Noonday Mine in the late 1870s. Jonas Osborne bought out the Browns, and renamed the townsite after Paiute leader Chief Tecopa. The camp grew into a town; in 1877 a post office began operating at there.

In 1878, it was determined that the townsite was 300 yards within Inyo county, settling a dispute with San Bernardino County of who controlled the township. Soon thereafter, the town went into decline, with most of the miners moving to Resting Springs in July 1879. Inyo County Sheriff William Welch considered Tecopa a costly mistake because, "it costs five cents a pound freight from San Bernardino here." The original townsite was occasionally occupied but never revived and in 2006 the Amargosa Conservancy acquired it for preservation purposes

The townsite is currently located in the vicinity of "The Triangle", a small piece of land surrounded by the arms of three "Y's" at the intersection of two roads. It was reestablished in 1907 when the Tonopah and Tidewater Railroad reached the site, which was the closest point from the railroad to the mines. A post office opened at the new site in 1907, was closed in 1931, and reopened in 1932. A church, some homes and seasonal eating establishments are also located by the Triangle.

=== Hot Springs ===
The road heading north of the Triangle leads to the Hot Springs zone of the community where the State of California made indemnity selections in 1927. The State subsequently sold parcels to private citizens. In the early 1960s, writer John Gregory Dunne documented that several low-income retirees were squatting in trailers within the zone.

The Bureau of Land Management (BLM) granted a 40-acre "Recreational and Public Purposes" (R&PP) lease to Inyo County for county-run facilities. The Hot Springs area is currently where the community center, fire station, library, several tourist facilities and some homes are located.

=== Tecopa Heights ===
The Triangle is the west endpoint of the Old Spanish Trail (OST) Heading east, the OST Road passes Tecopa-Francis Elementary School (now closed) to the intersection with the Furnace Creek Road. Southwest of the intersection is most populous part of the community, originally known as "Jackrabbit Flat." In the 1950s, the General Land Office, then the BLM began offering parcels under the authority of the Small Tract Act of 1938 as recreational properties to become known as "Jackrabbit Homesteads. The first round of five acre parcels were proofed and patented prior to 1959. After a change in policy, a second round of parcels were offered at fair market value by BLM. The lands offered under the first two rounds remain largely undeveloped. The third round of 2.5 acre parcels were offered in 1964 to provide inexpensive land for housing retirees that were squatting at the Hot Springs. Seven parcels were sold, six of which were purchased by the Thilenius and Parrish families who subdivided them and developed water systems. Those parcels now constitute the densest population of what is now known as "Tecopa Heights," the area offered under the Small Tracts Act. The cemetery is on the west side of Tecopa Heights.

Since Tecopa lacks proper water infrastructure that is capable of properly filtering ground water to state standards, the Southern Inyo County Fire Protection District in 2014 received a grant to install a water kiosk for the community. The community water kiosk was opened in 2017 east of Tecopa Heights on an R&PP lease granted by the BLM.

== Geography ==
In 1976, the U.S. Congress designated the federal lands within the CDP as part of the "California Desert Conservation Area" in Title VI, Section 601 of the Federal Land Policy and Management Act of 1976. Tecopa is on the eastern side of the Amargosa Range, which lies between the CDP and Death Valley, which was designated a National Park in the California Desert Protection Act of 1994 CDPA. The Nopah Range, a designated wilderness area in the CDPA, is to the east.

According to the United States Census Bureau, the CDP has a total area of 18.7 square miles (48 km^{2}), of which 18.6 square miles (48 km^{2}) is land and 0.1 square miles (0.26 km^{2}) is water.

== Economy ==
Historically, Tecopa's economy was based on silver and lead mining. Those mines closed in 1957, by which time retirees were moving to the area to enjoy the hot springs. Nearby mines for other minerals such as talc continued operating for another 25 years, providing employment for a few citizens of the area. Tourism to the hot springs increased and Tecopa began slowly transitioning to an ecotourist and resort area.

A major attraction in the area is the Tecopa Ecological Reserve, which hosts an undeveloped natural ground-fed hot spring. However, the natural hot spring is subject to closure because of impacts to protected Amargosa vole (a subspecies of Microtus californicau) habitat from camp fires and human waste.

Agriculture in Tecopa is limited, revolving mostly around date farming and cannabis cultivation.

The town has a growing microbrewery and bakery scene that caters to the patrons of Tecopa's three hot springs resorts during the fall and winter seasons.

== Arts and culture ==
Tecopa holds an annual firehouse fling in November. It is hosted by the Southern Inyo Fire Protection District as a way to raise funds for the rural fire department

In November, Tecopa also hosts the Tecopa Takeover Music Festival, which began in 2014

== Demographics ==
Historical population
Census	Pop.	Note	%±
2000	99		—
2010	150		51.5%
2020	120		−20.0%
U.S. Decennial Census; 1860–1870 1880-1890; 1900 1910 1920; 1930 1940 1950; 1960 1970 1980; 1990 2000 2010

Tecopa first appeared as a census designated place in the 2000 U.S. census.

=== Racial and ethnic composition ===
Tecopa CDP, California – Racial and ethnic composition Note: the US Census treats Hispanic/Latino as an ethnic category. This table excludes Latinos from the racial categories and assigns them to a separate category. Hispanics/Latinos may be of any race.
Race / Ethnicity (NH = Non-Hispanic)	Pop 2000	Pop 2010	Pop 2020	% 2000	% 2010	% 2020
White alone (NH)	86	115	101	86.87%	76.67%	84.17%
Black or African American alone (NH)	1	1	0	1.01%	0.67%	0.00%
Native American or Alaska Native alone (NH)	5	8	2	5.05%	5.33%	1.67%
Asian alone (NH)	0	2	1	0.00%	1.33%	0.83%
Native Hawaiian or Pacific Islander alone (NH)	0	0	0	0.00%	0.00%	0.00%
Other race alone (NH)	0	0	0	0.00%	0.00%	0.00%
Mixed race or Multiracial (NH)	3	16	10	3.03%	10.67%	8.33%
Hispanic or Latino (any race)	4	8	6	4.04%	5.33%	5.00%
Total	99	150	120	100.00%	100.00%	100.00%

=== 2020 ===
The 2020 United States census reported that Tecopa had a population of 120. The population density was 6.5 inhabitants per square mile (2.5/km^{2}). The racial makeup of Tecopa was 103 (85.8%) White, 2 (1.7%) Native American, 1 (0.8%) Asian, and 14 (11.7%) from two or more races. Hispanic or Latino of any race were 6 persons (5.0%).

The whole population lived in households. There were 74 households, out of which 8 (10.8%) had children under the age of 18 living in them, 24 (32.4%) were married-couple households, 3 (4.1%) were cohabiting couple households, 20 (27.0%) had a female householder with no partner present, and 27 (36.5%) had a male householder with no partner present. 38 households (51.4%) were one person, and 15 (20.3%) were one person aged 65 or older. The average household size was 1.62. There were 34 families (45.9% of all households).

The age distribution was 4 people (3.3%) under the age of 18, 1 person (0.8%) aged 18 to 24, 19 people (15.8%) aged 25 to 44, 48 people (40.0%) aged 45 to 64, and 48 people (40.0%) who were 65 years of age or older. The median age was 59.0 years. There were 51 males and 69 females.

There were 147 housing units at an average density of 7.9 units per square mile (3.1 units/km^{2}), of which 74 (50.3%) were occupied. Of these, 32 (43.2%) were owner-occupied, and 42 (56.8%) were occupied by renters.

== Infrastructure ==
=== Transportation ===
Public transportation in Tecopa is operated by Eastern Sierra Transit Authority as a fixed route lifeline service to residents of Tecopa to Pahrump twice a month. In October 2020, service was suspended because the contractor serving this route, Pahrump Senior Center, sold the route to a third-party vendor and failed to meet contractual obligations. Eastern Sierra Transit Authority is in the process of finding an alternative provider for the Tecopa bus route

=== Utilities ===
Tecopa receives electrical power through Southern California Edison. There is no gas utility serving Tecopa. The community instead relies on propane gas deliveries from companies located in Pahrump

The telephone carrier for Tecopa is AT&T. The county acknowledges that AT&T fails to maintain their network by providing unreliable telephone and internet service. The community instead relies on fixed wireless internet service providers and satellite internet

Tecopa does not have residential waste services. Instead, residents use communal dumpsters, which are serviced by Pahrump Valley Disposal.

== Politics and government ==
In the state legislature, Tecopa is in the 4th senatorial district, represented by Republican Marie Alvarado-Gil, and the 8th Assembly district, represented by Republican David Tangipa.

Federally, Tecopa is in California's 3rd congressional district, represented by Independent Kevin Kiley.

=== Education ===
Children in Tecopa attend schools operated by Death Valley Unified School District.

=== Library ===
The Tecopa Branch Library, of the Inyo County Free Library provides internet access to community members who lack affordable internet.

=== Public Safety ===
Law enforcement services to Tecopa are provided by the Inyo County Sheriff's Office

Fire fighting services is provided by Southern Inyo Fire Protection District, which is headquartered in Tecopa.

=== Cemetery ===
Cemetery services in Tecopa have been managed by the Tecopa Cemetery District since February 2022

=== In popular culture ===
Tecopa was the subject of an extended article by writer John Gregory Dunne published in The Saturday Evening Post in 1965 and reprinted in Dunne's book Quintana & Friends, published by E. P. Dutton in 1978.

== See also ==
- Lake Tecopa
- Tecopa Lake Beds — geologic formation.
