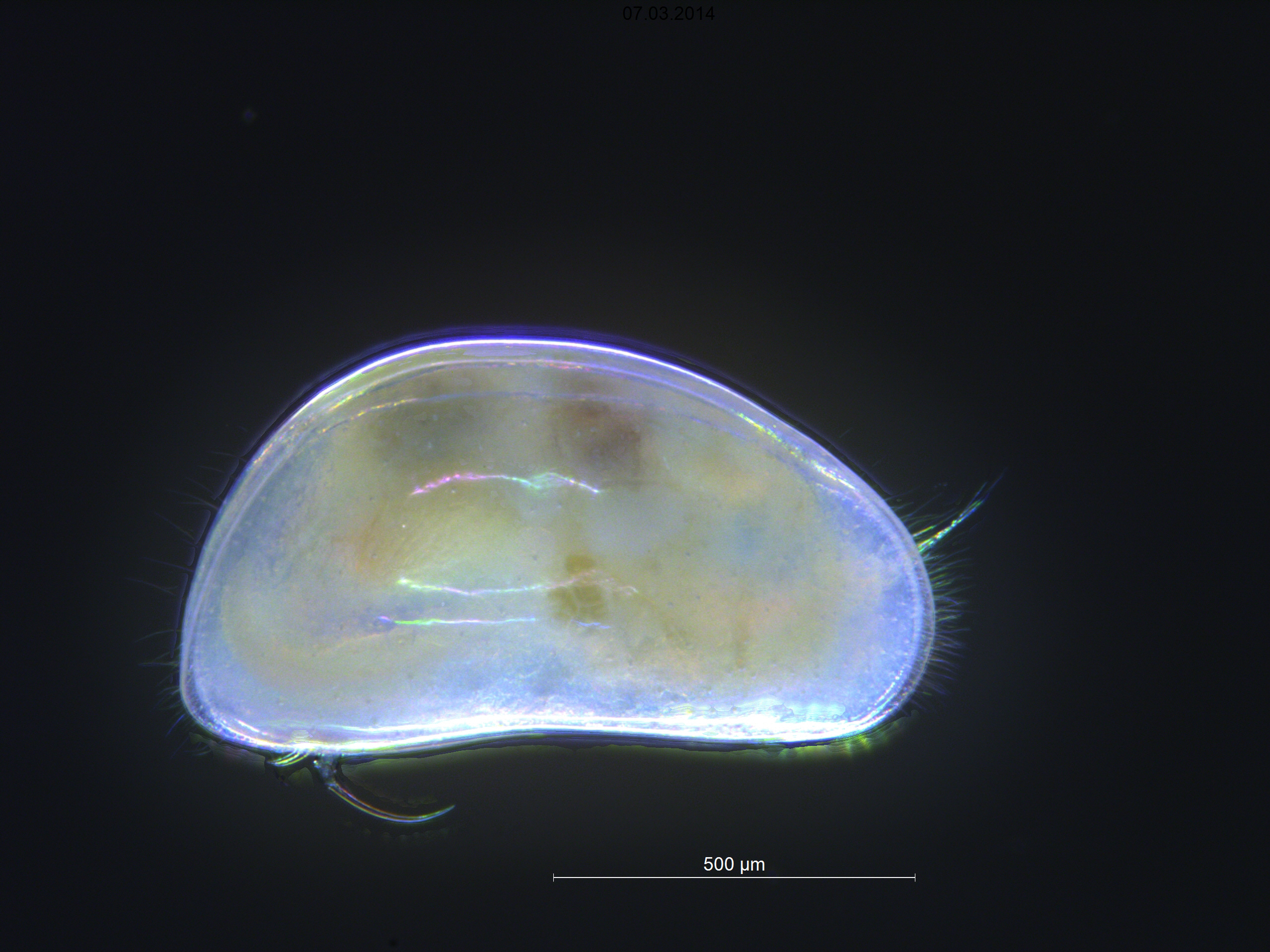
- Candona candida

Scientific classification
- Kingdom: Animalia
- Phylum: Arthropoda
- Clade: Pancrustacea
- Class: Ostracoda
- Order: Podocopida
- Superfamily: Cypridoidea
- Family: Candonidae; Kaufmann, 1900

Subfamilies
- Candoninae; Cyclocypridinae; Paracypridinae

= Candonidae =

Family of seed shrimps

Candonidae is a family of ostracods, containing around 25% of all known species of freshwater ostracods. Around 75% of genera in the family are endemic to a single zoogeographic region. It contains more than 500 species, of which more than 300 are endemic to the Palearctic realm.

Cyclocypridinae are generally good swimmers, but Candoninae is unable to swim.

Paracypridinae lives in marine and brackish waters, although a few can live in freshwater.

== Taxonomy ==
The following genera are recognised in the family Candonidae:

- Aglaiella Daday, 1910 †
- Aglaiocypris Sylvester-Bradley, 1947
- Acandona
- Allocypria Rome, 1962
- Amphitritecandona Karanovic, 2007
- Areacandona Karanovic, 2005
- Baicalocandona Mazepova, 1976
- Candobrasilopsis Higuti & Martens, 2012
- Candona Baird, 1845
- Candonopsis Vavra, 1891
- Coralliaglaia Hartmann, 1974
- Cyclocypris Brady & Norman, 1889
- Cryptocandona Kaufmann, 1900
- Damonella Anderson, 1966 †
- Deminutiocandona Karanovic, 2003
- Dolerocypria Tressler, 1937
- Electrocypria Wang, Matzke-Karasz & Horne, 2022
- Eucandona Daday, 1900
- Fabaeformiscandona Krstic, 1972
- Gerdocypris McKenzie, 1983 †
- Ghardaglaia Hartmann, 1964
- Hancockcandonopsis Karanovic, 2018
- Hansacypris Wouters, 1984
- Humphreyscandona Karanovic & Marmonier, 2003
- Indocandona Gupta, 1984
- Kempfcyclocypris Karanovic, 2011
- Kencandona Karanovic, 2007
- Keysercypria Karanovic, 2011
- Latinopsis Karanovic & Datry, 2009
- Leicacandona Karanovic, 2007
- Mangalocypria Wouters, 1998
- Mazepovacandona Karanovic & Sitnikova, 2017
- Meischcandona Karanovic, 2001
- Meridiescandona Karanovic, 2003
- Mungava Harding, 1962
- Myanmarcypris Wang, Matzke-Karasz, Horne, Zhao, Cao, Zhang & Wang, 2020 †
- Neglecandona
- Neocandona Karanovic, 2005
- Notacandona Karanovic & Marmonier, 2003
- Origocandona Karanovic, 2005
- Paracandona Hartwig, 1899 †
- Paracypria Sars, 1910
- Paracypris Sars, 1866
- Parapontoparta Hartmann, 1955
- Phlyctenophora Brady, 1880
- Physocypria Vávra, 1897
- Pierrecandona Karanovic, 2007
- Pilbaracandona Karanovic & Marmonier, 2003
- Pioneercandonopsis Karanovic, 2005
- Pontoparta Vavra, 1901
- Pseudocandona Kaufmann, 1900
- Reconcavona Krömmelbein, 1962 †
- Renaudcypris McKenzie, 1980
- Salvadoriella Krömmelbein, 1963 †
- Tasmanocypris McKenzie, 1979
- Thalassocypria Hartmann, 1957
- Trajancandona Karanovic, 1999
- Trapezicandona Schornikov, 1969
- Triangulocypris Teeter, 1975
- Typhlocypris Vejdovsky, 1882

== See also ==
- Fabaeformiscandona aemonae, an endangered species from Slovenia
- Namibcypris, an extinct genus from Namibia
- Typhlocypris
- Cyprididae, a family containing 50% of all freshwater ostracods
