= List of endorheic basins =

The following is a list of endorheic basins, watersheds which do not drain to the sea.

Major endorheic basins of the world. Basins are shown in dark gray; major endorheic lakes are shown in black.

== Africa ==
- Chott Melrhir (Algeria)
- Chott Ech Chergui (Algeria)
- Chott el Hodna (Algeria)
- Tidikelt Depression (Algeria)
  - Sebkha Azzel Matti
  - Sebhka Mekerrhane
- Tunisian salt lakes (Tunisia)
  - Chott el Djerid
  - Chott el Gharsa
- Qattara Depression (Egypt)
- Siwa Depression (Egypt)
- Lake Chad Basin (Cameroon, Chad, Niger, Nigeria)
- Western Equatorial Crater Lakes (Cameroon)
  - Lake Barombi Koto
  - Lake Barombi Mbo
  - Lake Bermin
  - Lake Benakouma
  - Lake Dissoni/Soden
  - Lake Mboandong
- Makgadikgadi Pans (Botswana)
- Northern Eastern Rift (Djibouti, Eritrea, Ethiopia)
  - Afar Depression (Djibouti, Eritrea, Ethiopia)
  - Ethiopian Rift Valley lakes (Ethiopia)
- Lake Chew Bahir, Ethiopia, Kenya
- Chalbi Desert, Kenya, Ethiopia
- Lake Logipi-Suguta Valley (Kenya)
- Lake Turkana Basin (Ethiopia, Kenya)
- Southern Eastern Rift (Kenya, Tanzania)
  - Lake Baringo (Kenya)
  - Lake Bogoria (Kenya)
  - Lake Nakuru (Kenya)
  - Lake Elmenteita (Kenya)
  - Lake Naivasha (Kenya)
  - Lake Magadi (Kenya)
  - Lake Natron (Tanzania)
  - Lake Eyasi (Tanzania)
  - Lake Barangida (Tanzania)
  - Lake Singida (Tanzania)
  - Lake Sulunga (Tanzania)
- Lake Rukwa (Tanzania)
- Lake Chilwa (Malawi)
- Lake Chiuta (Malawi, Mozambique)
- Etosha Basin (Angola, Namibia)
- Okavango Basin (Angola, Botswana, Namibia, Zimbabwe)

== Antarctica ==
- Lake Vanda
- Lake Vida

== Australia ==
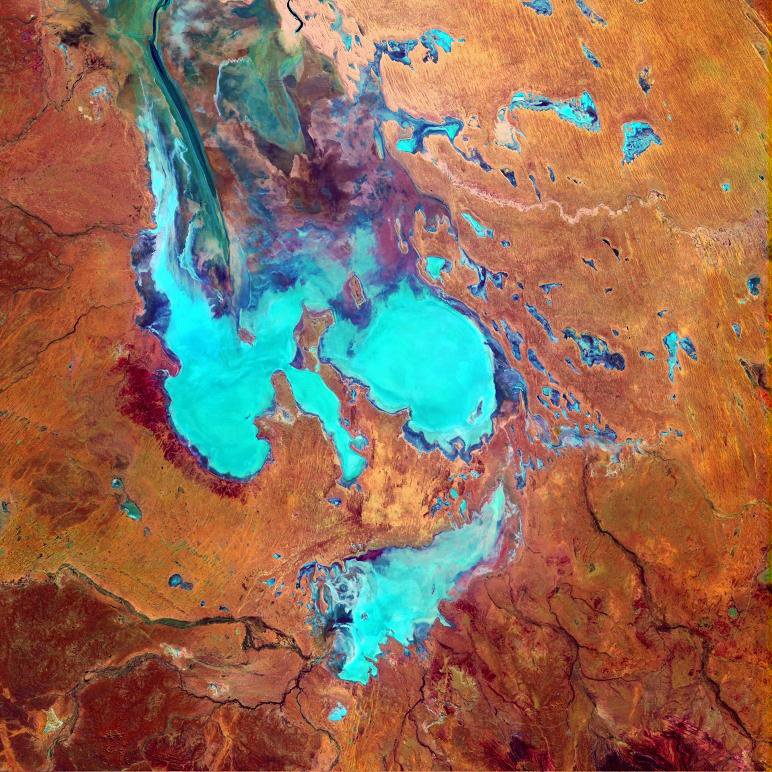
A false-colour satellite photo of Australia's Lake Eyre Image credit: NASA's Earth Observatory

- Arckaringa Basin (South Australia)
- Lake Eyre Basin (Queensland, New South Wales, Northern Territory, South Australia), which drains into the highly variable Lake Eyre and includes Lake Frome.
- Lake Gairdner (South Australia)
- Lake Torrens (South Australia)
- Lake Corangamite (western Victoria)
- Lake George (New South Wales), formerly connected to the Murray-Darling Basin.
- Bulloo-Bancannia drainage basin (New South Wales)

== Eurasia ==
- Caspian Sea Basin (Armenia, Azerbaijan, Georgia, Iran, Kazakhstan, Russia, Turkey, Turkmenistan) including the Volga River.
- Aral Sea Basin (Afghanistan, Kyrgyzstan, Kazakhstan, Tajikistan, Turkmenistan, Uzbekistan) including the Syr Darya and Amu Darya rivers.
- Lake Balkhash Basin (China, Kazakhstan)
- Emin Valley (China, Kazakhstan)
  - Lake Alakol
- Issyk-Kul, Son-Kul and Chatyr-Kul lakes (Kyrgyzstan)
- Dzungarian Basin (China)
  - Ulungur Lake
  - Ebinur Lake
  - Manas Lake
  - Ailik Lake
- Uvs Nuur basin (Mongolia, Russia)
- Great Lakes Depression (Mongolia, Russia)
  - Khyargas-Nurr Lake
  - Khar-Us Lake
  - Khar Lake
- Tarim Basin (China)
  - Lop Nur
- Gobi Desert (China, Mongolia)
- Hulun Lake (China, Mongolia), sometimes overflows into the Argun River, a tributary of the Amur
- Tibetan Plateau (China)
  - Nam Lake
  - Siling Lake
  - Tangra Lake
  - Ngangze Lake
  - Taro Lake
  - Ngangla Ringco
  - Zhari Namco
  - Dagze Lake
  - Dogai Coring Lake
  - Qinghai Lake (China)
  - Qaidam Basin (China)
  - Kumkol Basin (between the Altyn-Tagh and the Kunlun)
- Torey Lakes (Russia)
- Turpan Depression (China)
- Sistan Basin (Afghanistan, Iran, Pakistan)
- Hamun-e Mashkid (Iran, Pakistan)
- Hari River, Afghanistan (Tedzhen River) (Afghanistan, Iran, Turkmenistan)
- Murgab River (Afghanistan, Turkmenistan)
- Iranian Plateau (Iran)
  - Bejestan
  - Dasht-e Kavir
  - Dasht-e Lut
  - Zayande River
  - Hamun-e Jaz Murian
  - Kor River (Kor Rud)
  - Lake Maharlu 29.481°N 52.805°E
  - Namak Lake
  - Sirjan
  - Yazd
- Lake Urmia (Iran)
- Lake Van (Turkey)
- Central Anatolian lake basins (Turkey)
  - Lake Tuz
  - Lake Beyşehir
  - Lake Eğirdir
  - Lake Burdur
  - Lake Acıgöl
- Syrian Desert Basins (Syria, Jordan, Iraq, Saudi Arabia)
  - Sabkhat al Muh (Syria)
  - Buhayrat al 'Utaybah (Syria)
- Arabian Peninsula (Saudi Arabia, Iraq, Jordan, United Arab Emirates, Oman, Yemen)
  - Wadi al-Rummah
  - Wadi Dawasir
  - Rub' al Khali
  - Arabian Desert
- pluvial Sea of Galilee and Dead Sea Basins (Israel, Jordan, Lebanon, Palestinian Territories, Syria)
- (India)
  - Sambhar Lake (India)
  - Tso Kar (India)
  - Tso Moriri (India)
  - Pangong Tso (India)
- Neusiedlersee (Austria)
- Lake Trasimeno (Italy) -- cryptorheic
- Laguna de Gallocanta (Spain)
- Estany de Banyoles (Spain)
- The Lasithi Plateau in Crete, Greece -- cryptorheic
- Lake Chany, Russia

== North America ==
- Endorheic basins in the Great Plains
  - Quill Lakes, Lenore Lake, and Basin Lake (Saskatchewan)
  - Missouri Coteau-Old Wives Lake (Saskatchewan)
  - Great Sand Hills-Crane Lake and Bigstick Lake (Saskatchewan)
  - Pakowki Lake (Alberta)
  - Skeleton Lake (Alberta)
  - Manitou, Tramping, Buffalo, and Sullivan lakes (Alberta, Saskatchewan)
  - Little Manitou Lake (Saskatchewan)
  - Devils Lake (North Dakota)
  - Coteau des Prairies (mostly South Dakota)
  - The Sandhills (Nebraska)
  - White Woman Basin (Kansas)
- Choelquoit Lake (British Columbia)
- Eagle Lake (British Columbia)
- Martin Lake (British Columbia)
- Devil's Lake (Wisconsin) -- cryptorheic
- Great Divide Basin (Wyoming)
- San Luis Closed Basin (Colorado)
- Crater Lake (Oregon) -- cryptorheic
- Great Basin (California, Idaho, Nevada, Oregon, Utah and Wyoming)
  - Oregon Lakes (California, Oregon)
    - Harney Basin (Harney and Malheur lakes) (Oregon)
    - Alvord Lake (Oregon)
    - Goose Lake (California, Oregon)
    - Summer and Silver lakes (Oregon)
  - North Lahontan Basin (California, Nevada, Oregon), a system of endorheic sub-basins connected with pluvial Lake Lahontan
    - Pyramid Lake (a remnant of Lake Lahontan) fed by Truckee River-Lake Tahoe (California, Nevada)
      - Honey Lake-Eagle Lake (California)
    - Walker Lake (another remnant of Lake Lahontan) fed by Walker River (California, Nevada)
    - Black Rock Desert (Nevada)
    - Carson Sink – Carson River (Nevada)
    - Humboldt Sink – Humboldt River (Nevada)
    - Quinn River (Nevada)
  - Bonneville Basin (Idaho, Nevada, Utah, Wyoming), a system of endorheic basins connected to pluvial Lake Bonneville
    - Great Salt Lake (remnant of Lake Bonneville) in Utah
    - Sevier Lake (Utah)
    - Utah Lake – Jordan River
  - South Lahontan Basin (California, Nevada), draining into pluvial Lake Manly in Death Valley
    - Amargosa River-Badwater Basin (California, Nevada)
    - Mono Basin/Lake, Owens River/Lake, China Lake, Searles Valley/Lake, Panamint Valley (California, Nevada)
      - Rogers and Rosamond Lakes (California)
    - pluvial Lake Mojave (Silver Lake and Soda Lake, California)
      - Mojave River (California)
      - Danby Lake, Cadiz Lake, Bristol Lake
  - Central Nevada basins separate from the Bonneville and Lahontan systems
    - Groom Dry Lake (Nevada)
  - Disjunct Colorado River tributaries
    - pluvial Lake Cahuilla and Salton Sea (California, Baja California)
    - Eldorado Valley-Pahrump Valley (California, Nevada)
- Willcox Playa (Arizona)
- Zuni Salt Lake (New Mexico)
- Tularosa Basin (New Mexico, Texas)
- Guzmán Basin (Chihuahua, Mexico, southwestern New Mexico)
- Bolsón de Mapimí (Chihuahua, Coahuila, Durango, and Zacatecas, Mexico)
- Llanos el Salado (Coahuila, Nuevo León, San Luis Potosí, Tamaulipas, and Zacatecas, Mexico)
- Valley of Mexico (Federal District, Hidalgo, Mexico, and Tlaxcala, Mexico)
- Oriental Basin (Puebla, Tlaxcala, and Veracruz, Mexico)
- Lake Pátzcuaro (Michoacan, Mexico)
- Lake Cuitzeo (Michoacan, Mexico)
- Lago de Atitlán (Guatemala)
- Frame Lake, Yellowknife, Northwest Territories, Canada
- Eagle Lake, Martin Lake, and Choelquoit Lake on the Chilcotin Plateau in Central British Columbia are all endorheic lakes. All three lakes have lost considerable volume since the 1970s, as have smaller endorheic lakes in the area, such as Suds Lake, Whitesands Lake, and Lunch Lake.
- Tā Ch'ilā Lake (formerly Boya Lake) is a tropical coloured lake in the far north of British Columbia.

== South America ==
- Altiplano Basin (Argentina, Bolivia, Chile, Peru) includes Lake Titicaca, Lake Poopo, and the Salar de Uyuni.
- Lake Valencia (Venezuela)
- Desagues de los Colorados (northeastern Argentina)
- Dulce River (Argentina)-Laguna de Mar Chiquita (north-central Argentina)
- Northwest Pampas Basins (Dry Pampas of central Argentina)
- Southwest Pampas Basins (Dry Pampas of central Argentina)
- Meseta Somuncura (Patagonia region of southern Argentina)

== Islands ==
- Cul-de-Sac Depression and Lago Enriquillo, on Hispaniola Island.
- Buada Lagoon, Nauru
- Kauhakō Crater, Molokai, Hawaii
- Lake Waiau, Hawaii (at low levels)
- Sutton Salt Lake, New Zealand's South Island

== Ancient ==
Some of Earth's ancient endorheic systems include:

- The Black Sea, until its merger with the Mediterranean
- The Mediterranean Sea and all its tributary basins, during its Messinian desiccation (5 mya approximately) as it became disconnected from the Atlantic Ocean.
- Ebro and Duero basins, draining most of northern Spain during the Neogene and perhaps Pliocene.
- Lake Tanganyika in Africa. Currently at an overflow level and therefore draining into the sea via the Lukuga River, but the lake level has been lower in the past, possibly as recently as 1800.
- Tularosa Basin and Lake Cabeza de Vaca in North America. Basin formerly much larger than at present, including the ancestral Rio Grande north of Texas, feeding a large lake area.
