= Endorheic lake =

Depression within an endorheic basin where water collects with no visible outlet

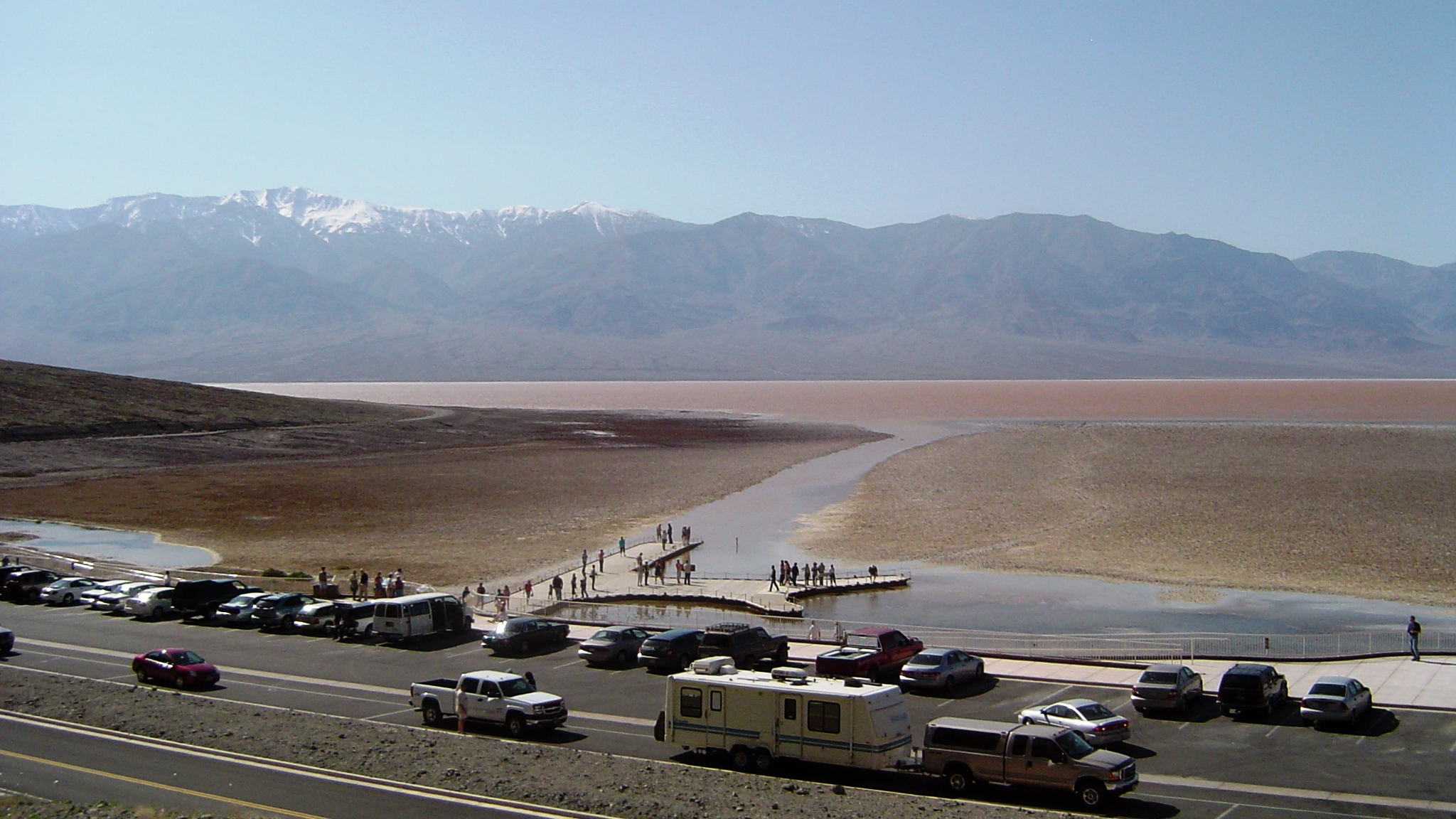
Death Valley, Spring 2005: ephemeral Lake Badwater in the flooded Badwater Basin

An endorheic lake (also called a sink lake or terminal lake) is a collection of water within an endorheic basin, or sink, with no evident outlet. Endorheic lakes are generally saline as a result of being unable to get rid of solutes left in the lake by evaporation. Lakes with subsurface drainage are called cryptorheic.

== Components of endorheic lakes ==
The two main ways that endorheic lakes accumulate water are through river flow into the lake (discharge) and precipitation falling into the lake. The collected water of the lake, instead of discharging, can only be lost due to either evapotranspiration or percolation (water sinking underground, e.g., to become groundwater in an aquifer). Because of this lack of an outlet, endorheic lakes are mostly salt water rather than fresh water. The salinity in the lake gradually builds up through years as water evaporates and leaves its solutes behind.

== Similar types of lakes ==
Depending on water losses, precipitation, and inflow (e.g., a spring, a tributary, or flooding), the temporal result of a lake in a sink may change. The lake could be a persistent lake, an intermittent lake, a playa lake (temporarily covered with water), or an ephemeral lake, which completely disappears (e. g. by evaporation) before reappearing in wetter seasons. These terms (playa, ephemeral lake, etc.) are sometimes used interchangeably, but there has been activity tending towards defining meanings for each term.

== Anthropogenic effects ==
Many endorheic lakes exist in arid or semi-arid climates. Because these climates have limited rainfall, but also a high possibility of evaporation, endorheic lakes in these regions often experience flux in their water levels. This flux can be aggravated by anthropogenic intrusions (e.g. global warming).

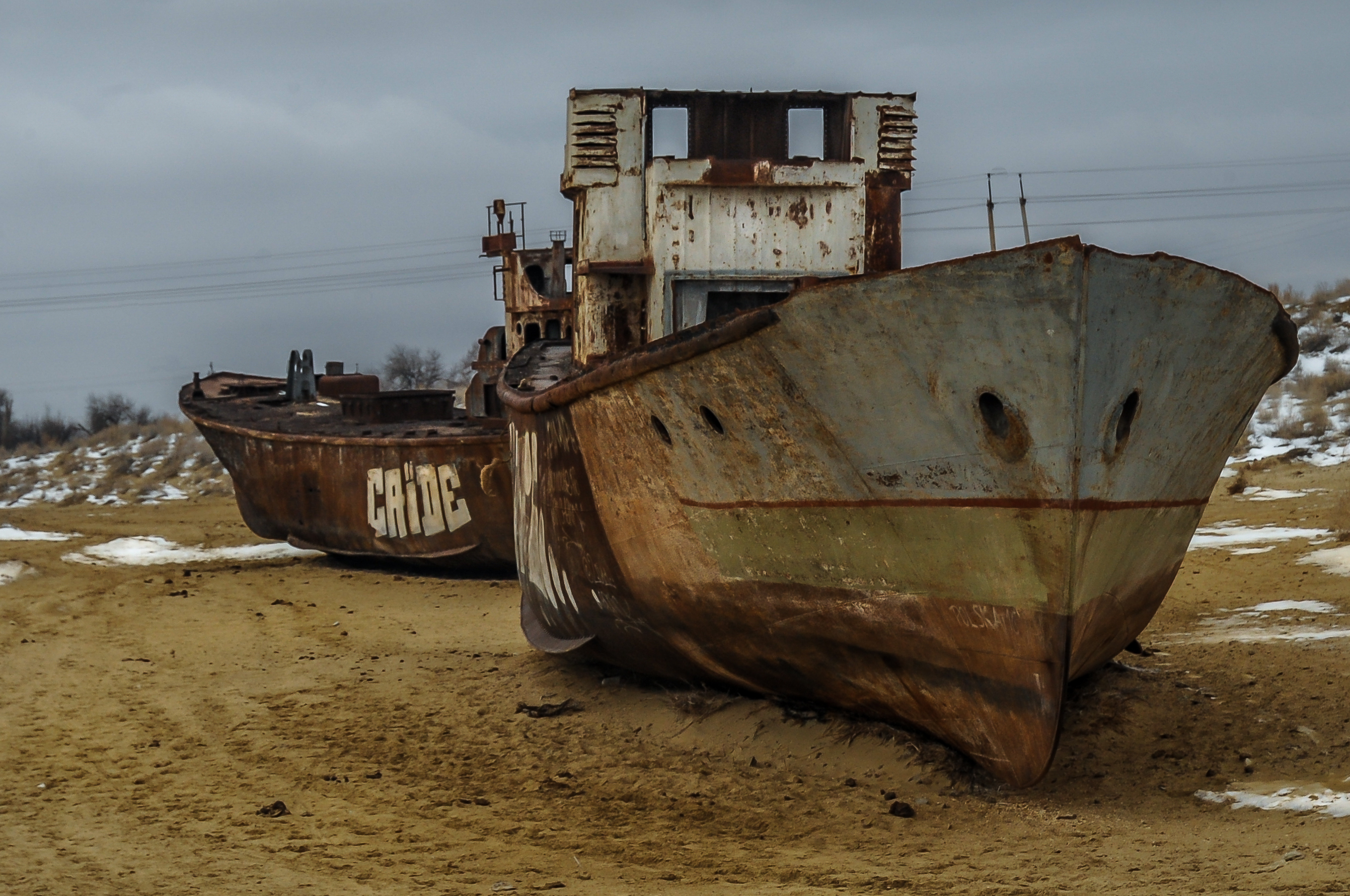
Example of anthropogenic effects on the Aral Sea

In Central Asia, a large percentage of water for farming comes from surface water, like endorheic lakes, rather than precipitation. Because of the overall lack of precipitation, farming in this area can only be sustained by irrigation. Massive amounts of irrigation in agrarian Central Asia have led to the reduction in size of endorheic lakes. The Aral Sea was once the second largest endorheic lake in the world, but anthropogenic effects such as bad irrigation practices have led to this lake's drastic decrease in size and transition into a desert, the Aralkum Desert.

Endorheic lakes, because of the closed nature of their systems, are sensitive to new conditions. Records of previous environmental change are preserved in lake sediments in endorheic lakes that are being affected by climate change; these natural records can give information about past climates and conditions of the lake. Research on these lake sediments could lead to these lakes becoming archives of the effects of climate change. There is early evidence that in regions affected by irrigation the majority of endorheic lake area may have already been lost.

== List of endorheic lakes ==
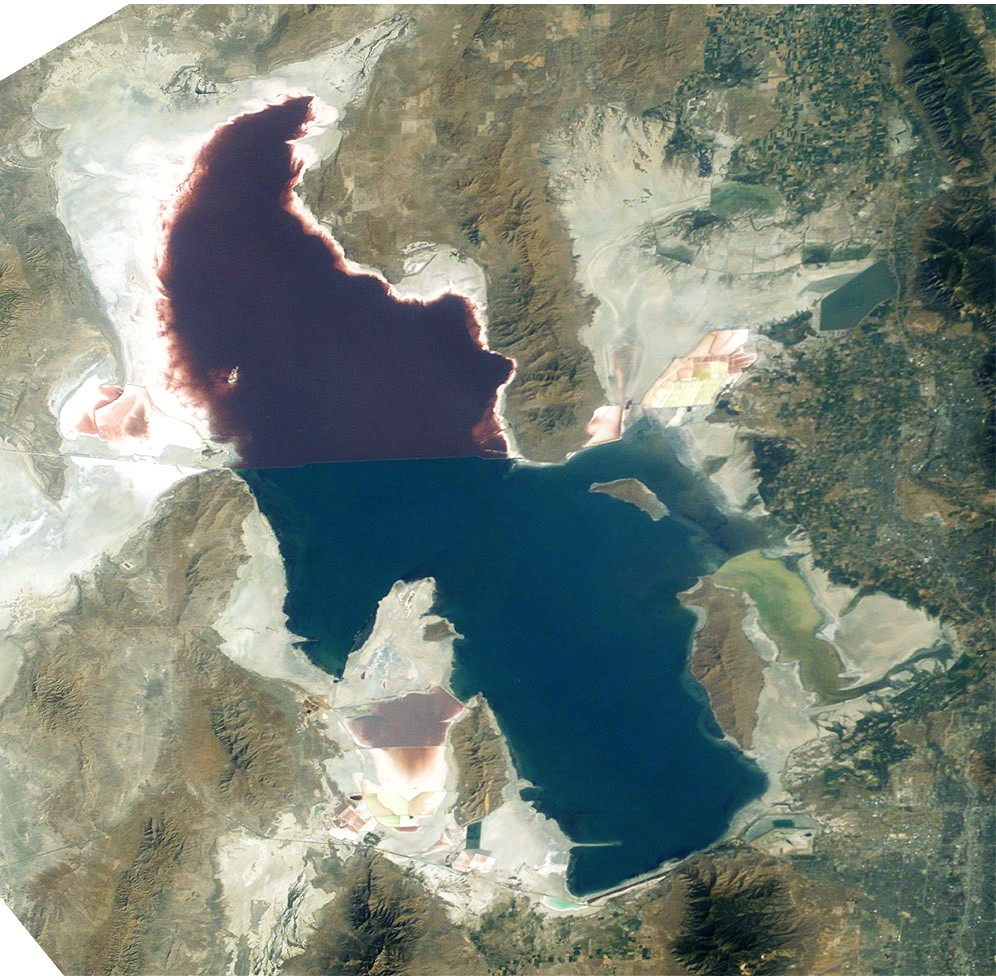
The Great Salt Lake (an endorheic lake) in Utah, USA taken from the ISS.

=== Africa ===
- Afar Depression (Great Rift Valley in East Africa)
- Lake Chad (Central Africa)
- Lake Rukwa (East Africa)
- Lake Turkana (East Africa)

=== Asia ===
- Aral Sea (Kazakhstan; Uzbekistan)
- Lake Balkhash (Kazakhstan)
- Caspian Sea (Iran; Azerbaijan; Russia; Kazakhstan; Turkmenistan)
- Dead Sea (Israel; Jordan; West Bank)
- Gavkhouni (Isfahan, Iran)
- Hamun-e Jaz Murian (Kerman and Sistan and Baluchistan, Iran)
- Hamun Lake (Iran)
- Issyk-Kul (Kyrgyzstan)
- Lake Urmia (West Azerbaijan province, Iran)
- Lake Van (Turkey)
- Maharloo Lake (Fars province, Iran)
- Namak Lake (Qom, Iran)
- Qarhan Playa (Qinghai, China)
- Shalkar (Kazakhstan)
- Pangong Tso (Ladakh, India; Tibet, China)

=== Australia ===
- Kumpupintil Lake (Western Australia)
- Lake Eyre (South Australia)
- Lake George (New South Wales)

=== Europe ===
- Botkul (Kazakhstan–Russia border)
- Caspian Sea
- Lake Neusiedl (Austria, Hungary)
- Lake Prespa (Balkans)
- Lake Trasimeno (Italy)

=== North America ===
- Carson Sink (Churchill County, Nevada, U.S.)
- Devils Lake (North Dakota, U.S.)
- Devil's Lake (Wisconsin, U.S.)
- Lake Enriquillo (Dominican Republic)
- Etang Saumâtre (Haiti)
- Great Salt Lake (Utah, U.S.)
- Humboldt Sink (northwestern Nevada, U.S.)
- Mono Lake (Mono County, California, U.S.)
- Owens Lake (Eastern Sierra, California, U.S.)
- Pyramid Lake (western Nevada, U.S.)
- Quinn River Sink (northwestern Nevada, U.S.)
- Salton Sink (southern California, U.S.)
- Eagle Lake (British Columbia, Canada)
- Choelquoit Lake (British Columbia, Canada)
- Martin Lake (British Columbia, Canada)
- Manitou Lake (Saskatchewan, Canada)
- Lake Xochimilco (Mexico City, Mexico)

=== South America ===
- Lake Poopó (Altiplano part of Bolivia)

== See also ==
- Sinkhole – Geologically-formed topological depression
