= Qom (disambiguation) =

Qom is a city in Iran.

Qom or QOM may also refer to:

== Places in Iran ==
- Qom Province, which the city of Qom is in
  - Qom County
- Qom River, which runs through the city of Qom
- Qom, Razavi Khorasan, a village

== Other uses ==
- Qom people, of South America
- Qom language
- QOM, or Queen of the Mountains, a title in cycling races or certain sports apps (e.g. Strava).
- QEMU Object Model (Computing: QOM), framework for registering user creatable types and instantiating objects from those types.

== See also ==
- Qum (disambiguation)
