= Kom =

Kom or KOM may refer to:

== Ethnic groups ==
- Kom people (Afghanistan), a Nuristani tribe in Afghanistan and Pakistan
- Kom people (Cameroon), an ethnic group of northwest Cameroon
- Kom people (India), a Tibeto-Burman tribe in north-eastern India
- Kom people (South America), an ethnic group in northeastern Argentina, Bolivia and Paraguay

== Languages ==
- Kom language (Cameroon), a Bantoid language
- Kom language (India), a Sino-Tibetan language
- Kom language (South America), a Guaicuruan language
- Komi language (ISO 639-3 code: kom)

== Music ==
- Kom (album), by Swedish singer Lars Winnerbäck
- "Kom" (Jessica Andersson song), by Swedish singer Jessica Andersson
- "Kom" (Timoteij song), by Swedish europop group Timoteij
- Mathias Kom, Canadian singer-songwriter

== Places ==
- Kom and Župa Komska, fortress and župa of the medieval Bosnian state, centered in the village of Glavatičevo
- Kom, Croatia, a village
- Kom Peak, a mountain peak in Bulgaria
- Kom Monastery, a monastery in Montenegro
- Knowledge Oasis Muscat, a technology park near Muscat, Oman
- Kom, a village, part of Kom-Kanas Mongolian Ethnic Township in Xinjiang, China

== Sports ==
- FK Kom, a Montenegrin football club
- King of the Mountains, award in cycling stage races, and also the user with the highest score in the rankings in certain activities monitored by applications such as Strava
- Mary Kom, an Indian boxer

== Other uses ==
- Kickoff meeting, the first meeting with the project team and the client of the project
- KOM (BBS), a type of bulletin board system
- KoM, Knight of Malta, in the Sovereign Military Order of Malta

== See also ==
- Qom (disambiguation)
- Com (disambiguation)
- Nkom (disambiguation)
