= Endorheic basin =

Closed drainage basin that has no outflow

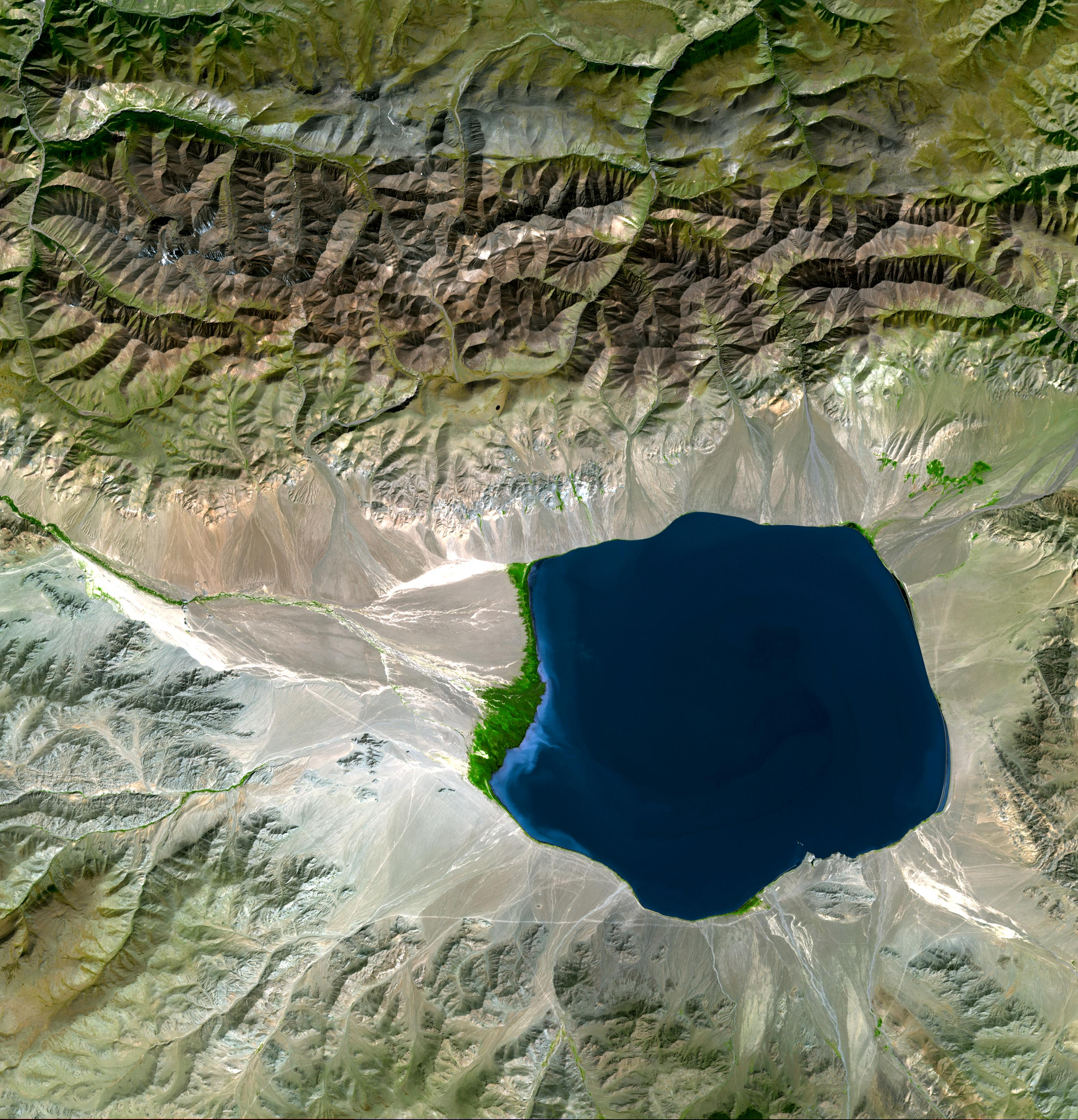
The endorheic basin that feeds water into Üüreg Lake, Mongolia

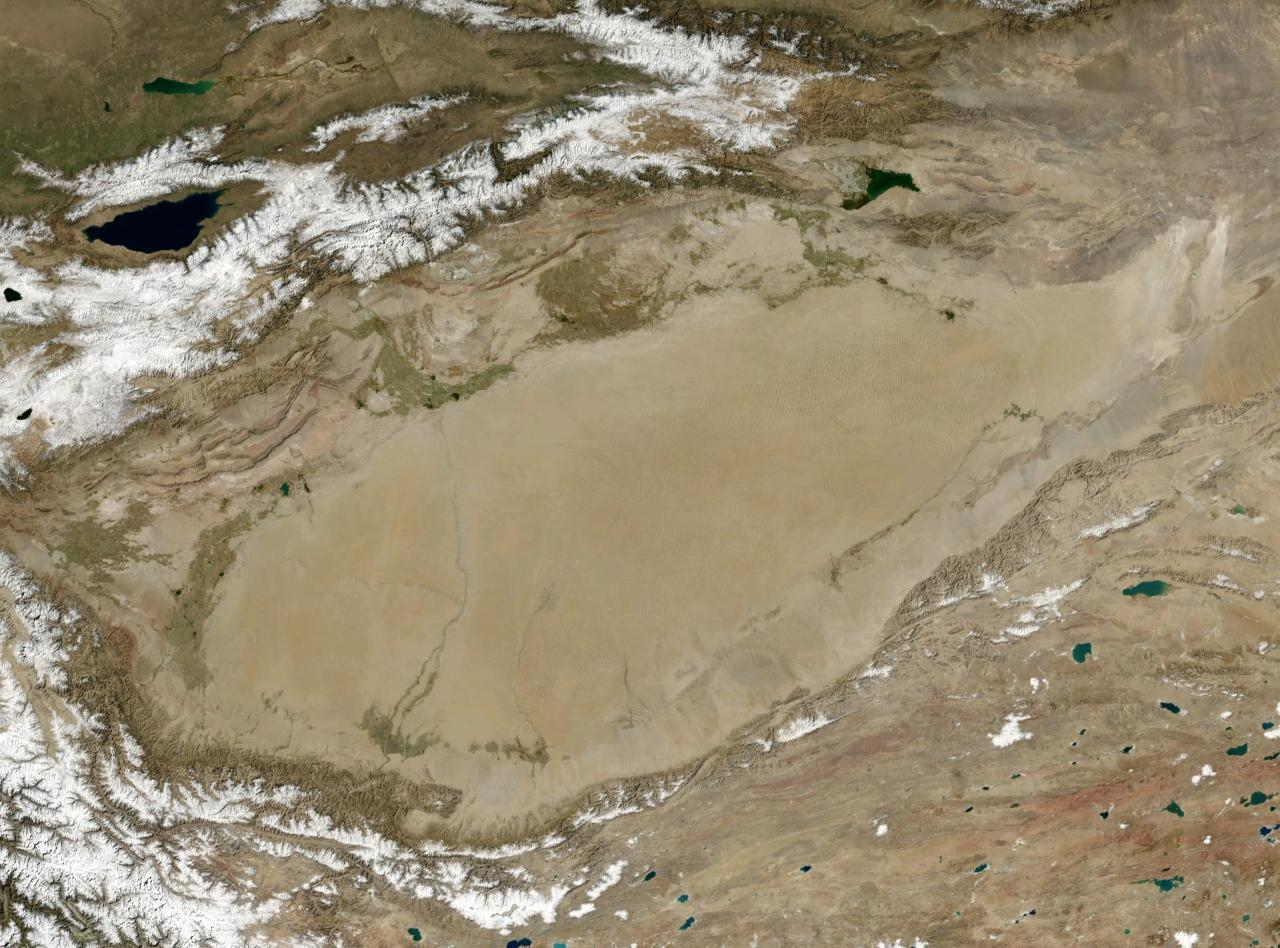
NASA photo of the endorheic Tarim Basin, China

An endorheic basin (/ˌɛndoʊˈriː.ɪk/ EN-doh-REE-ik; also endoreic basin and endorreic basin) is a drainage basin that normally retains water and allows no outflow to other external bodies of water (such as rivers and oceans). Instead, the water drainage flows into permanent and seasonal lakes and swamps that equilibrate through evaporation. Endorheic basins are also called closed basins, terminal basins, and internal drainage systems.

Endorheic regions contrast with open lakes (exorheic regions), where surface waters eventually drain into the ocean. In general, water basins with subsurface outflows that lead to the ocean are not considered endorheic; but cryptorheic. Endorheic basins constitute local base levels, defining a limit of the erosion and deposition processes of nearby areas. Endorheic water bodies include the Caspian Sea, which is the world's largest inland body of water.

== Etymology ==
The term endorheic derives from the French word endoréisme, which combines endo- (Ancient Greek: ἔνδον éndon 'within') and ῥεῖν rheîn 'flow'.

== Endorheic lakes ==
Endorheic lakes (terminal lakes) are bodies of water that do not flow into an ocean or a sea. Most of the water that falls to Earth percolates into the oceans and the seas by way of a network of rivers, lakes, and wetlands. Analogous to endorheic lakes is the class of bodies of water located in closed watersheds (endorheic watersheds) where the local topography prevents the drainage of water into the oceans and the seas. These endorheic watersheds (containing water in rivers or lakes that form a balance of surface inflows, evaporation and seepage) are often called sinks.

Endorheic lakes are typically located in the interior of a landmass, far from an ocean, and in areas of relatively low rainfall. Their watersheds are often confined by natural geologic land formations such as a mountain range, cutting off water egress to the ocean. The inland water flows into dry watersheds where the water evaporates, leaving a high concentration of minerals and other inflow erosion products. Over time this input of erosion products can cause the endorheic lake to become relatively saline (a "salt lake"). Since the main outflow pathways of these lakes are chiefly through evaporation and seepage, endorheic lakes are usually more sensitive to environmental pollutant inputs than water bodies that have access to oceans, as pollution can be trapped in them and accumulate over time.

== Occurrence ==
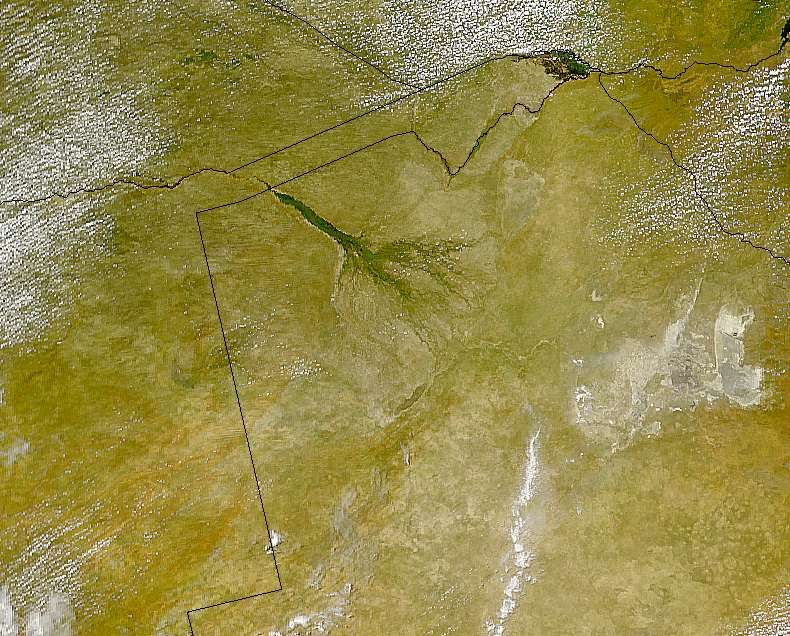
The Okavango Delta (centre) of southern Africa, where the Okavango River spills out into the empty trough of the Kalahari Desert. The area was a lake fed by the river during the Ice Ages (national borders are superimposed).

Endorheic regions can occur in any climate but are most commonly found in desert locations. This reflects the balance between tectonic subsidence and rates of evaporation and sedimentation. Where the basin floor is dropping more rapidly than water and sediments can accumulate, any lake in the basin will remain below the sill level (the level at which water can find a path out of the basin). Low rainfall or rapid evaporation in the watershed favor this case. In areas where rainfall is higher, riparian erosion will generally carve drainage channels (particularly in times of flood), or cause the water level in the terminal lake to rise until it finds an outlet, breaking the enclosed endorheic hydrological system's geographical barrier and opening it to the surrounding terrain. The Black Sea was likely such a lake, having once been an independent hydrological system before the Mediterranean Sea broke through the terrain separating the two. Lake Bonneville was another such lake, overflowing its basin in the Bonneville flood. The Malheur/Harney lake system in Oregon is normally cut off from drainage to the ocean, but has an outflow channel to the Malheur River. This is presently dry, but may have flowed as recently as 1,000 years ago.

Examples of relatively humid regions in endorheic basins often exist at high elevation. These regions tend to be marshy and are subject to substantial flooding in wet years. The area containing Mexico City is one such case, with annual precipitation of 850 mm (33 in) and characterized by waterlogged soils that require draining.

Endorheic regions tend to be far inland with their boundaries defined by mountains or other geological features that block their access to oceans. Since the inflowing water can evacuate only through seepage or evaporation, dried minerals or other products collect in the basin, eventually making the water saline and also making the basin vulnerable to pollution. Continents vary in their concentration of endorheic regions due to conditions of geography and climate. Australia has the highest percentage of endorheic regions at 21 per cent while North America has the least at five per cent. Approximately 18 per cent of the Earth's land drains to endorheic lakes or seas, the largest of these land areas being the interior of Asia.

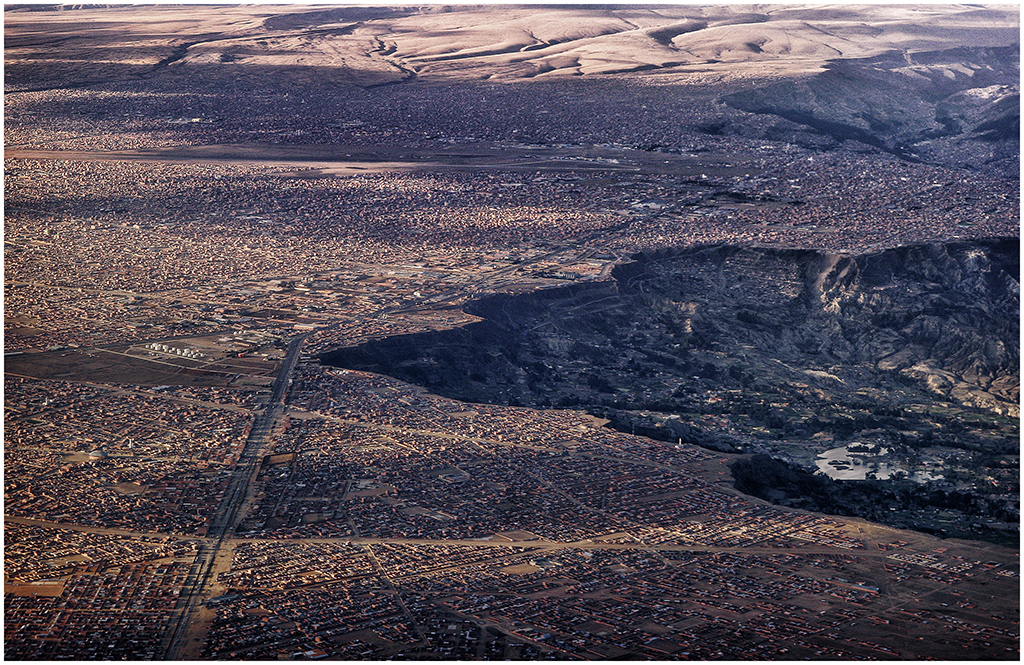
Aerial view of the endorheic Altiplano basin at the boundary between the cities of El Alto (left) and La Paz (right). Note the topographic contrast between the plateau and the descending valley.

In deserts, water inflow is low and loss to solar evaporation high, drastically reducing the formation of complete drainage systems. In the extreme case, where there is no discernible drainage system, the basin is described as arheic. Closed water flow areas often lead to the concentration of salts and other minerals in the basin. Minerals leached from the surrounding rocks are deposited in the basin, and left behind when the water evaporates. Thus endorheic basins often contain extensive salt pans (also called salt flats, salt lakes, alkali flats, dry lake beds, or playas). These areas tend to be large, flat hardened surfaces and are sometimes used for aviation runways, or land speed record attempts, because of their extensive areas of perfectly level terrain.

Both permanent and seasonal endorheic lakes can form in endorheic basins. Some endorheic basins are essentially stable because climate change has reduced precipitation to the degree that a lake no longer forms. Even most permanent endorheic lakes change size and shape dramatically over time, often becoming much smaller or breaking into several smaller parts during the dry season. As humans have expanded into previously uninhabitable desert areas, the river systems that feed many endorheic lakes have been altered by the construction of dams and aqueducts. As a result, many endorheic lakes in developed or developing countries have contracted dramatically, resulting in increased salinity, higher concentrations of pollutants, and the disruption of ecosystems.

Even within exorheic basins, there can be "non-contributing", low-lying areas that trap runoff and prevent it from contributing to flows downstream during years of average or below-average runoff. In flat river basins, non-contributing areas can be a large fraction of the river basin, e.g. Lake Winnipeg's basin. A lake may be endorheic during dry years and can overflow its basin during wet years, e.g., the former Tulare Lake.

Because the Earth's climate has recently been through a warming and drying phase with the end of the Ice Ages, many endorheic areas such as Death Valley that are now dry deserts were large lakes relatively recently. During the last ice age, the Sahara may have contained lakes larger than any now existing.

Climate change coupled with the mismanagement of water in these endorheic regions has led to devastating losses in ecosystem services and toxic surges of pollutants. The desiccation of saline lakes produces fine dust particles that impair agriculture productivity and harm human health. Anthropogenic activity has also caused a redistribution of water from these hydrologically landlocked basins such that endorheic water loss has contributed to sea level rise, and it is estimated that most of the terrestrial water lost ends up in the ocean. In regions such as Central Asia, where people depend on endorheic basins and other surface water sources to satisfy their water needs, human activity greatly impacts the availability of that water.

== Notable endorheic basins and lakes ==
Major endorheic basins of the world. Basins are shown in dark grey; major endorheic lakes are shown in black. Coloured regions represent the major drainage patterns of the continents to the oceans (non-endorheic).

=== Africa ===
Large endorheic regions in Africa are located in the Sahara Desert, the Sahel, the Kalahari Desert, and the East African Rift:

- Chad Basin, in the northern centre of Africa. It covers an area of approximately 2.434 million km^{2}.
- Qattara Depression, in Egypt.
- Chott Melrhir, in Algeria.
- Chott el Djerid, in Tunisia.
- The Okavango River, in the Kalahari Desert, is part of an endorheic basin region, the Okavango Basin, that also includes the Okavango Delta, Lake Ngami, the Nata River, and a number of salt pans such as Makgadikgadi Pan.
- Etosha Pan in Namibia's Etosha National Park.
- Turkana Basin, in Kenya, whose basin includes the Omo River of Ethiopia.
- Lake Chilwa, in Malawi.
- Afar Depression, in Eritrea, Ethiopia, and Djibouti, which contains the Awash River
- Some Rift Valley lakes, such as Lake Abijatta, Lake Chew Bahir, Lake Shala, Lake Chamo, and Lake Awasa.
- Lake Mweru Wantipa, in Zambia.
- Lake Magadi, in Kenya.
- Lake Rukwa, in Tanzania.

=== Asia ===
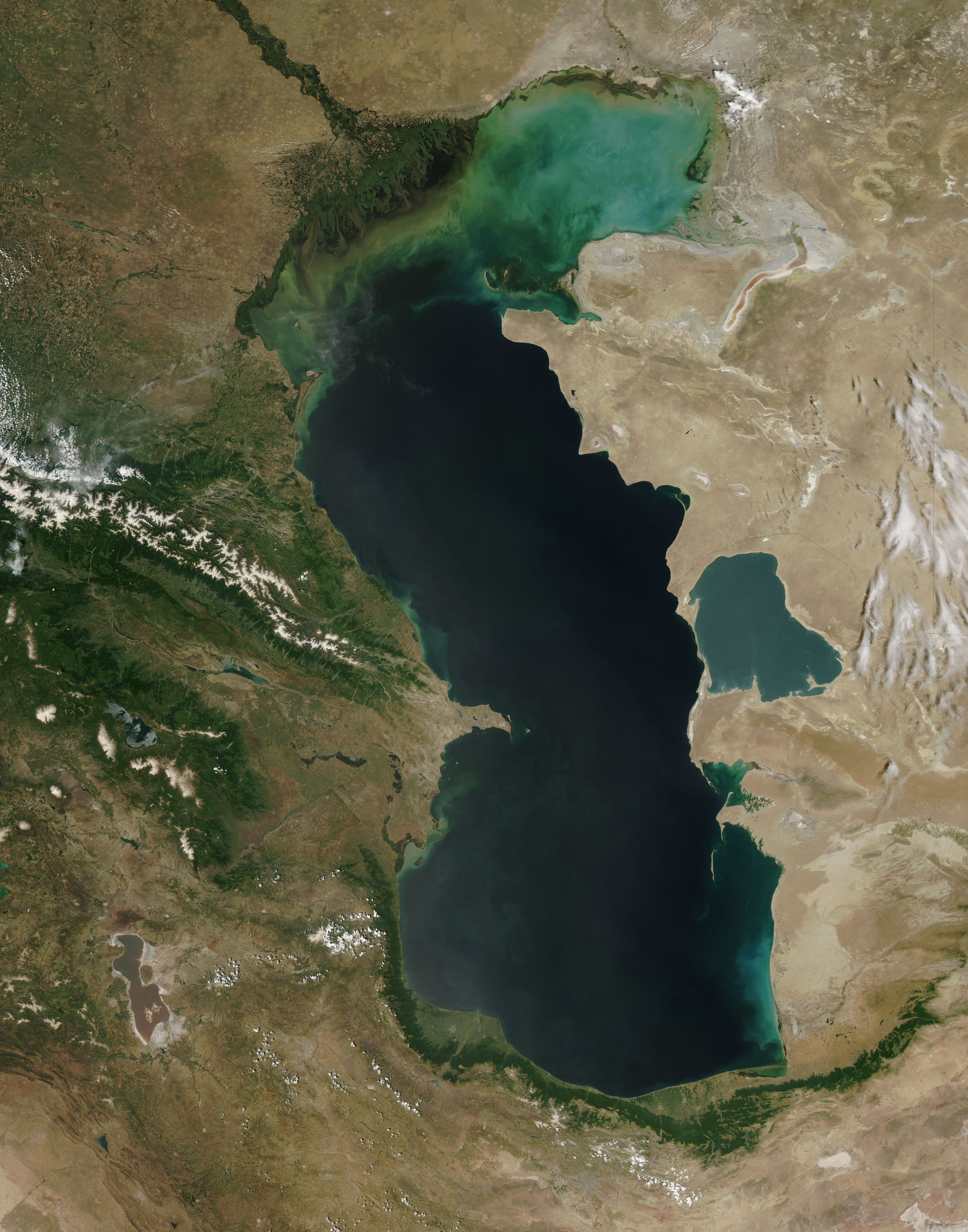
The Caspian Sea, a large inland basin

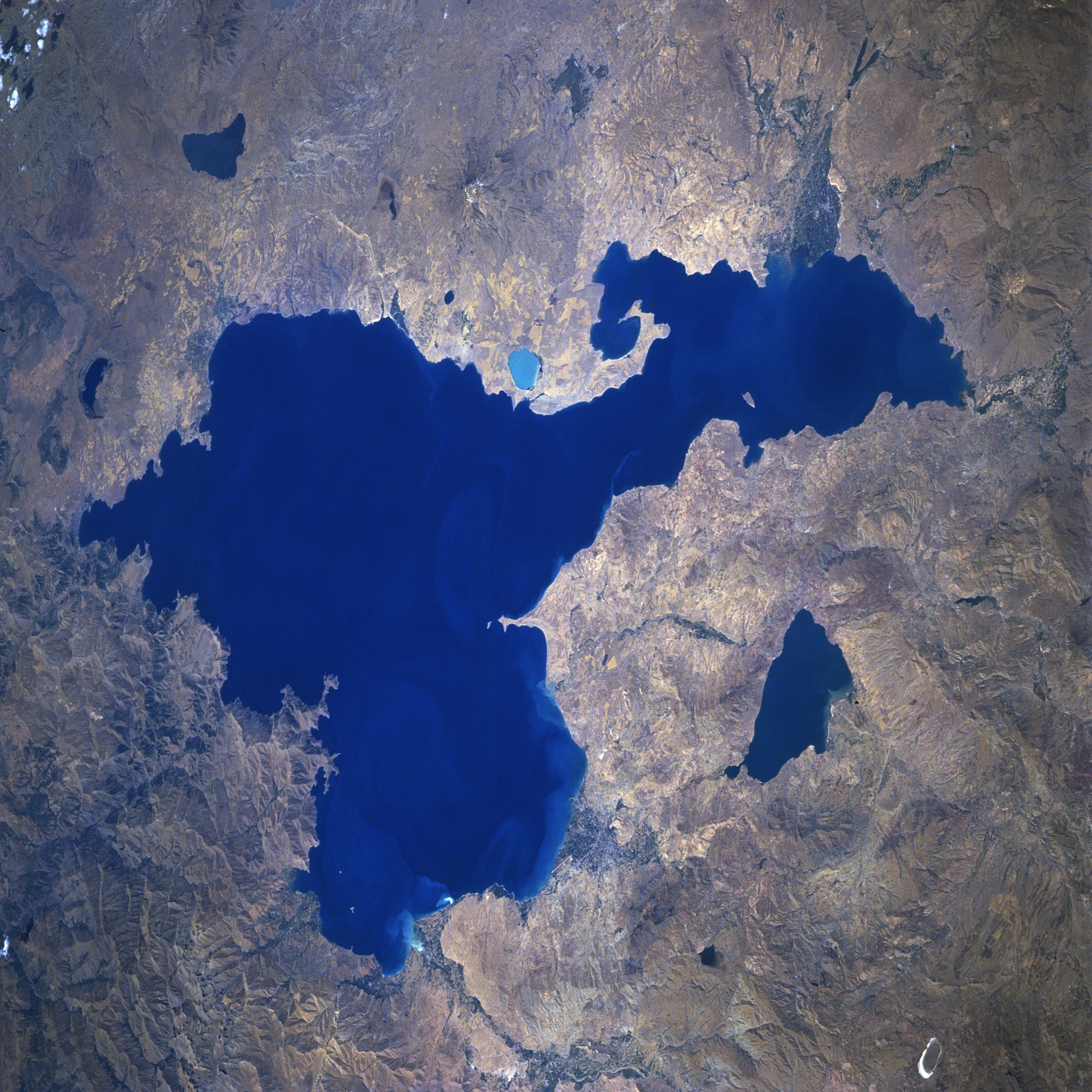
Lake Van, Turkey

Much of Western and Central Asia is a giant endorheic region made up of a number of contiguous closed basins. The region contains several basins and terminal lakes, including:

- The Caspian Sea, the largest lake on Earth. A large part of western Russia, drained by the Volga River, is part of the Caspian basin.
- Lake Urmia in Western Azerbaijan Province of Iran.
- The Aral Sea, whose tributary rivers have been diverted, leading to a dramatic shrinkage of the lake. The resulting ecological disaster has brought the plight of internal drainage basins to public attention.
- Lake Balkhash, in Kazakhstan.
- Issyk-Kul Lake and Chatyr-Kul Lake in Kyrgyzstan.
- Lop Lake, in the Tarim Basin of China's Xinjiang Uygur Autonomous Region.
- The Dzungarian Basin in Xinjiang, separated from the Tarim Basin by the Tian Shan. The most notable terminal lake in the basin is the Manas Lake.
- The Central Asian Internal Drainage Basin, in southern and western Mongolia, contains a series of closed drainage basins, such as the Khyargas Nuur basin, the Uvs Nuur basin, which includes Üüreg Lake, and the Pu-Lun-To River Basin.
- Qaidam Basin, in Qinghai Province, China, as well as nearby Qinghai Lake.
- Sistan Basin covering areas of Iran and Afghanistan
- Pangong Tso and Aksai Chin Lake on the China-India border
- Many small lakes and rivers of the Iranian Plateau, including Gavkhouni marshes and Namak Lake.
- Rub' al Khali Basin of the Arabian Peninsula, covering most of Saudi Arabia, and parts of the United Arab Emirates, Oman, and Yemen.

Other endorheic lakes and basins in Asia include:

- The Dead Sea, the lowest surface point on Earth and one of its saltiest bodies of water, lying between Israel and Jordan.
- Sambhar Lake, in Rajasthan, north-western India
- Lake Van in eastern Turkey
- Sabkhat al-Jabbul, extensive salt flats and a 100 square kilometres (39 sq mi) lake in Syria.
- Solar Lake, Sinai, near the Israeli-Egypt border.
- Lake Tuz, in Turkey, in south part of Central Anatolia Region.
- Sawa lake in Iraq, in Muthanna Governorate.

=== Australia ===
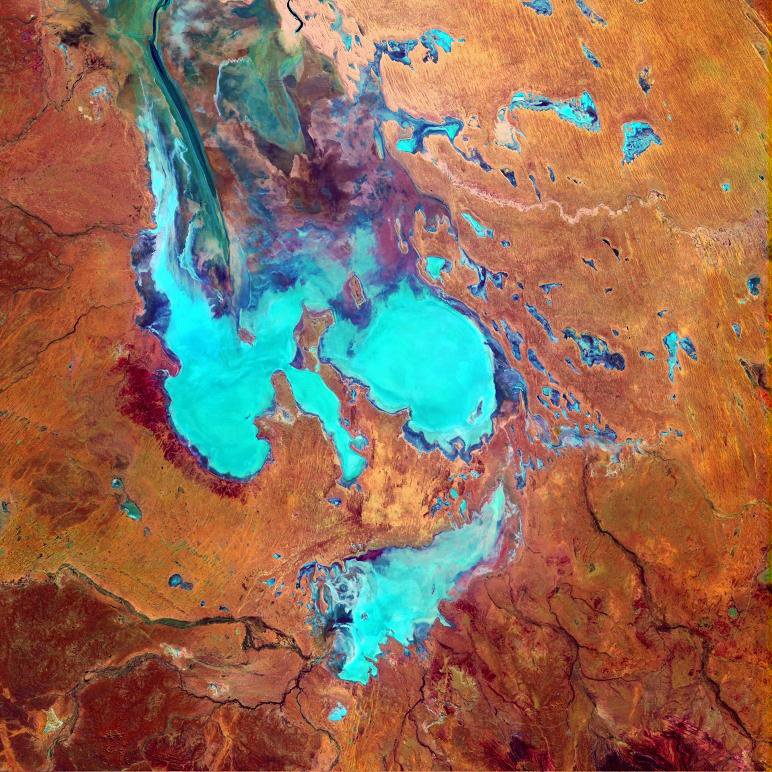
A false-colour satellite photo of Australia's Lake Eyre Image credit: NASA's Earth Observatory

Australia, being very dry and having exceedingly low runoff ratios due to its ancient soils, has many endorheic drainages. The most important are:

- Lake Eyre basin, which drains into the highly variable Lake Eyre and includes Lake Frome.
- Lake Torrens, usually an endorheic lake to the west of the Flinders Ranges in South Australia, that flows to the sea after extreme rainfall events.
- Lake Corangamite, a highly saline crater lake in western Victoria.
- Lake George, formerly connected to the Murray-Darling Basin

=== Europe ===
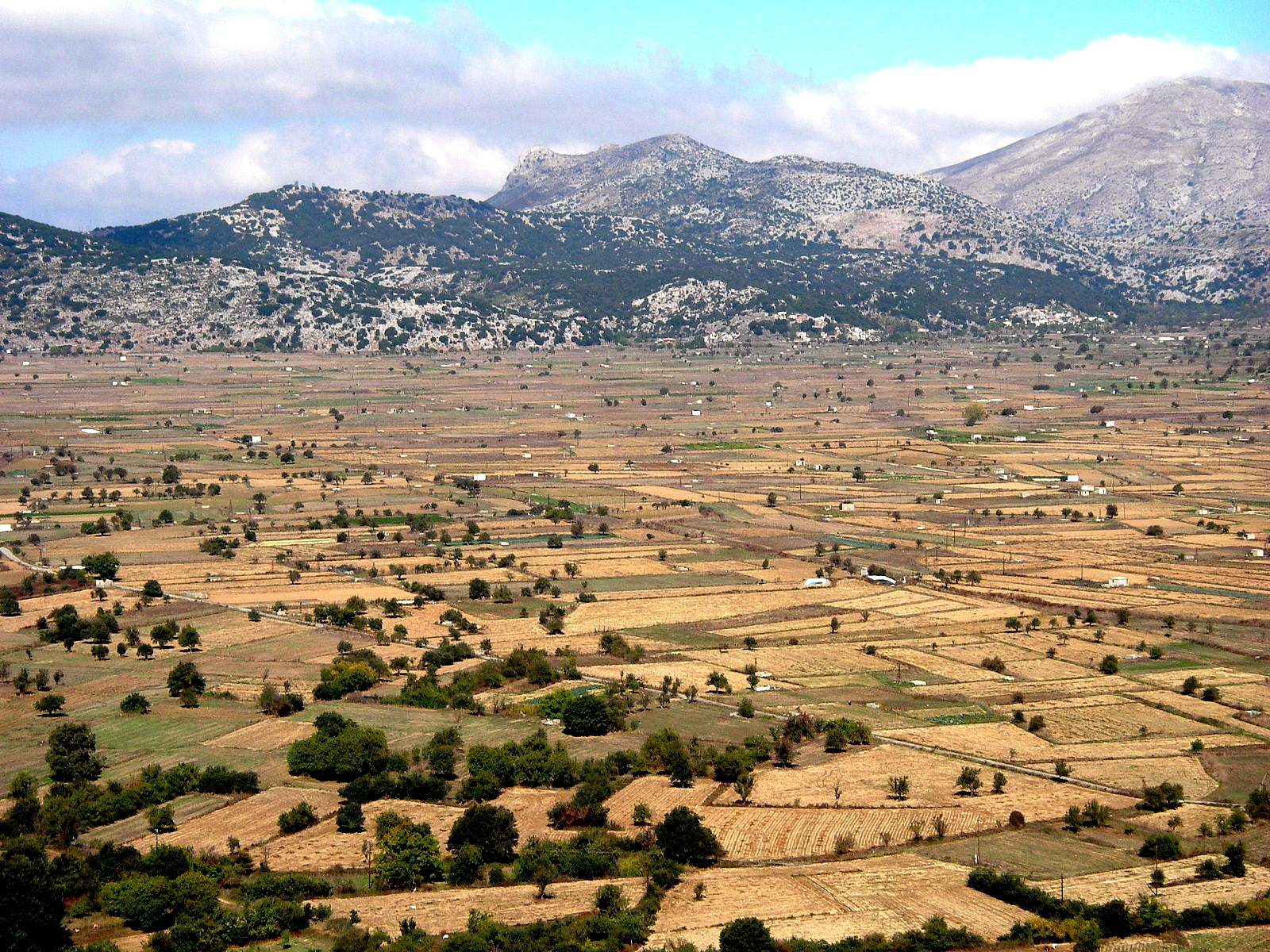
The Lasithi Plateau in Crete

Though a large portion of Europe drains to the endorheic Caspian Sea, Europe's wet climate means it contains relatively few terminal lakes itself: any such basin is likely to continue to fill until it reaches an overflow level connecting it with an outlet or erodes the barrier blocking its exit.

There are some seemingly endorheic lakes, but they are cryptorheic, being drained either through manmade canals, via karstic phenomena, or other subsurface seepage.

- Lake Neusiedl, in Austria and Hungary.
- Lake Trasimeno and Pergusa Lake, in Italy.
- Fucine Lake, in Italy, was drained starting under Ancient Rome.
- Lake Velence, in Hungary.
- Lake Balaton, in Hungary until the Sió was extended to the Danube and the flow reversed.
- Lake Prespa, between Albania, Greece and North Macedonia.
- Rahasane Turlough, the largest turlough in Ireland.
- Laacher See, in Germany.
- Lac du Lauvitel, in France, appeared ~4000 years ago due to a rock slide.
- Étang de Montady, in France, has been drained subterraneanly since the Middle Ages.
- The Lasithi Plateau, in Crete, Greece, is a high endorheic plateau.

Five minor eolian lakes exist close to Étang de Berre: Lavalduc Lake, Engrenier Lake, Pourra Lake, Estomac lake and Rassuen lake.

A few minor true endorheic lakes exist in Spain (e.g. Laguna de Gallocanta, Estany de Banyoles), Italy, Cyprus (Larnaca and Akrotiri salt lakes) and Greece.

There are also multiple small endoreic lake in the mountains in France: Allos Lake, Anterne Lake, Eychauda Laye, La Beunaz Lake, Cassière Lake, Lessy Lake, Peyre Lake, Tardevant Lake, Confins Lake, Rouites Lake, Grand Ban Lake and Flaine Lake for example.

=== North and Central America ===
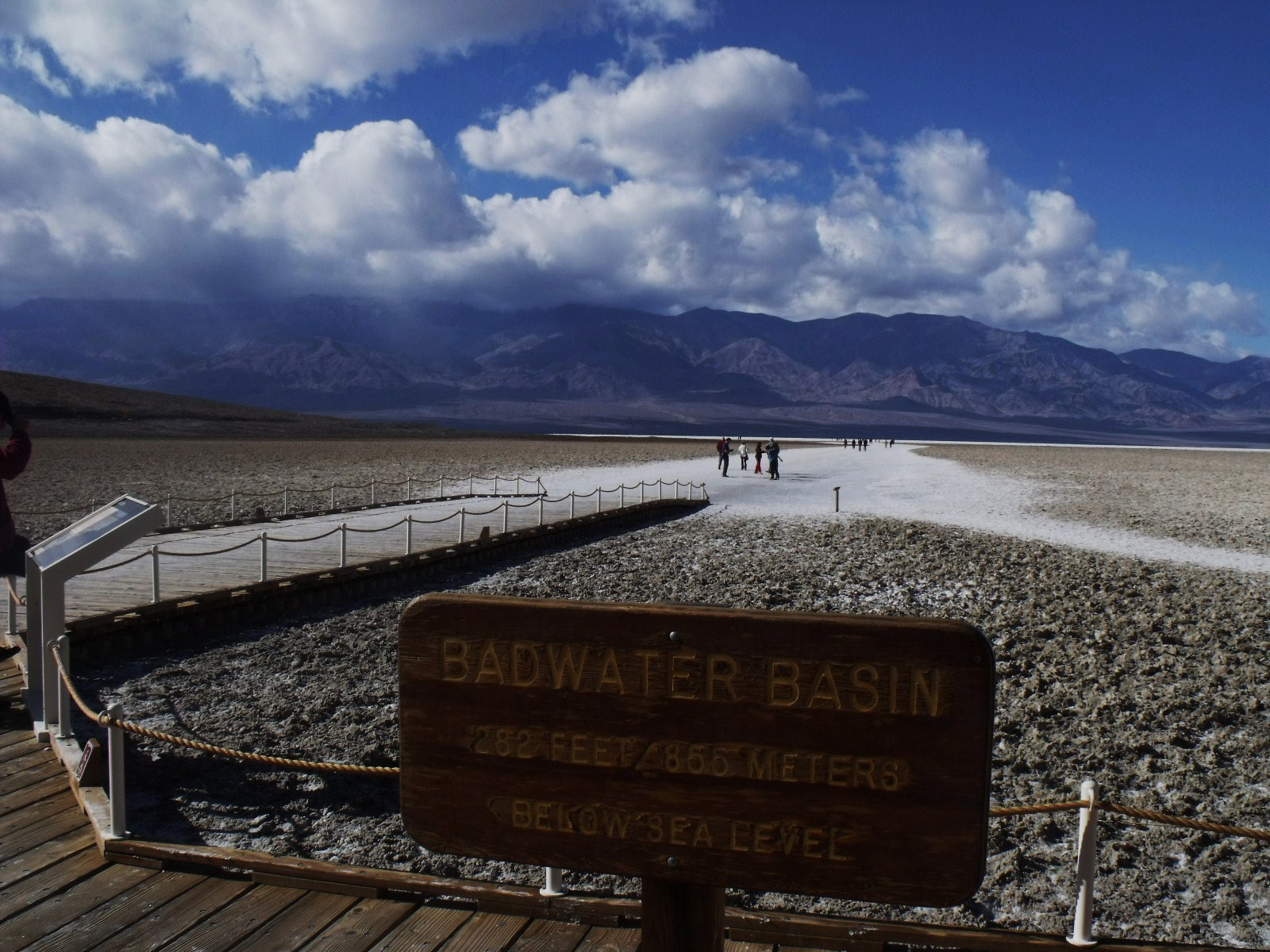
The dry lake in the Badwater Basin in Death Valley National Park

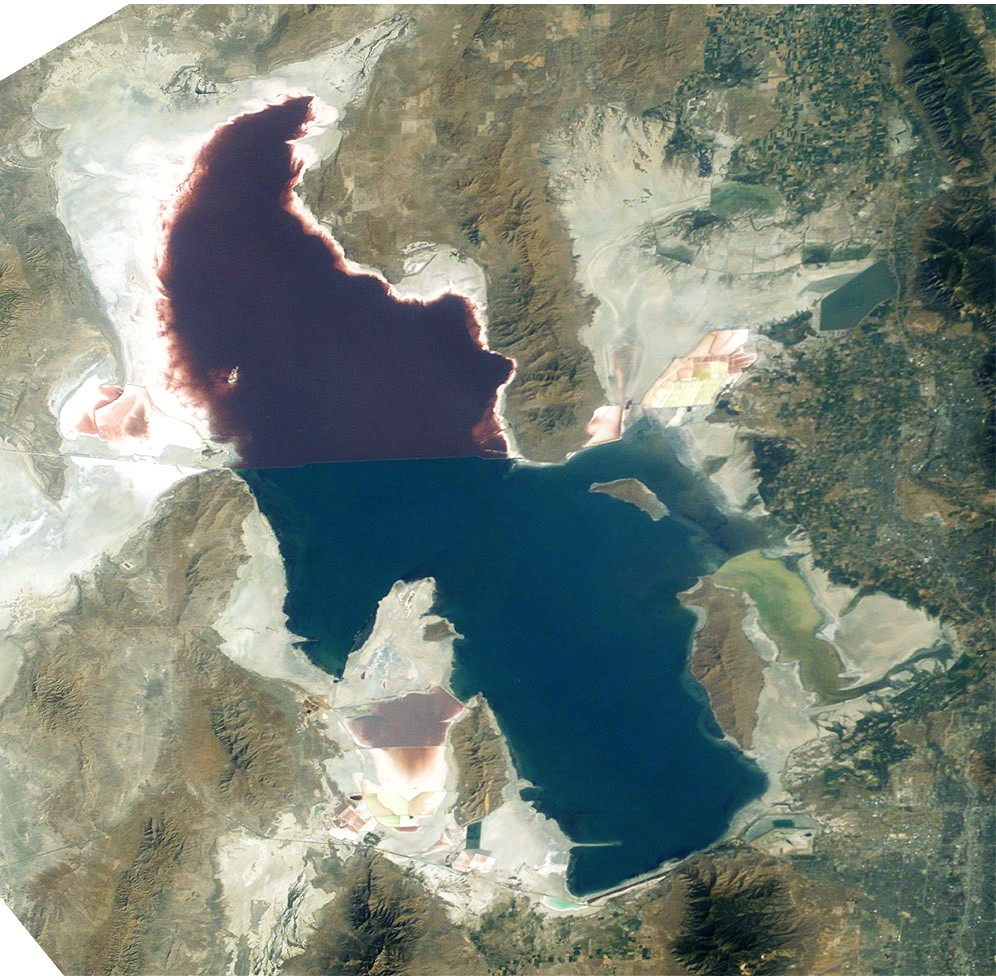
Great Salt Lake, Satellite photo (2003) after five years of drought

- The Great Basin is North America's largest and the world's ninth largest endorheic basin, covering nearly all of Nevada, much of Oregon and Utah, and portions of California, Idaho, and Wyoming. Notable enclosed basins include Death Valley, the hottest location on Earth; the Black Rock Desert and Bonneville Salt Flats, location of many of the new vehicle land speed records set since the 1930s; the Great Salt Lake, remnant of Lake Bonneville; and the Salton Sea.
- The Valley of Mexico. In Pre-Columbian times, the Valley was substantially covered with five lakes, including Lake Texcoco, Lake Xochimilco, and Lake Chalco.
- Guzmán Basin, in northern Mexico and the southwestern United States. The Mimbres River of New Mexico drains into this basin.
- Lago Atitlán, a volcanic caldera lake in the highlands of Guatemala. It is cryptorheic.
- Lago Coatepeque, El Salvador.
- Bolsón de Mapimí, in northern Mexico.
- Willcox Playa of southern Arizona.
- Tulare Lake in the San Joaquin Valley in Central California, fed by the Kaweah and Tule Rivers plus southern distributaries of the Kings. Historically, it would drain into the San Joaquin River in very wet years. Agricultural development and irrigation diversions have left the lake dry.
- Buena Vista Lake at the southmost end of the San Joaquin Valley in Southern California, fed by the Kern River. Historically, it would drain into Tulare Lake and the San Joaquin River in exceptionally wet years. Agricultural development and irrigation diversions have left the lake dry.
- Crater Lake, in Oregon, a cryptorheic lake with subsurface drainage to the Wood River. It is filled directly by rain and snow and has very little mineral or salt buildup.
- The Great Divide Basin in Wyoming, a small endorheic basin that straddles the Continental Divide of the Americas.
- Devils Lake, in North Dakota.
- Devil's Lake, in Wisconsin, cryptorheic.
- Tule Lake and the Lost River basin in California and Oregon.
- Little Manitou Lake in Saskatchewan.
- Manitou Lake in Saskatchewan.
- Old Wives Lake, on the Laurentian Divide in Saskatchewan.
- Quill Lakes, in Saskatchewan.
- Pakowki Lake, on the Laurentian Divide in Alberta.
- Paynes Prairie, in Florida. Since 1927, it has been drained by canal to the Atlantic Ocean via the River Styx.
- Spotted Lake, Osoyoos, British Columbia, Canada.
- Several lakes on the western Chilcotin Plateau sit on the divide between the Fraser River drainage to the east and the Homathko drainage to the west. Such examples include Choelquoit Lake, Eagle Lake, and Martin lake.
- Frame Lake in Yellowknife, capital of Canada's Northwest Territories.
- New Mexico has several desert endorheic basins, including:
  - The Tularosa Basin, a rift valley.
  - Zuñi Salt Lake, a maar.
  - The Mimbres River Basin, in Grant County.
  - The San Agustin Basin, in Catron and Socorro Counties.
- Lago Enriquillo on the island of Hispaniola in the Caribbean Sea.

Many small lakes and ponds in North Dakota and the Northern Great Plains are endorheic, and some have salt encrustations along their shores.

=== South America ===
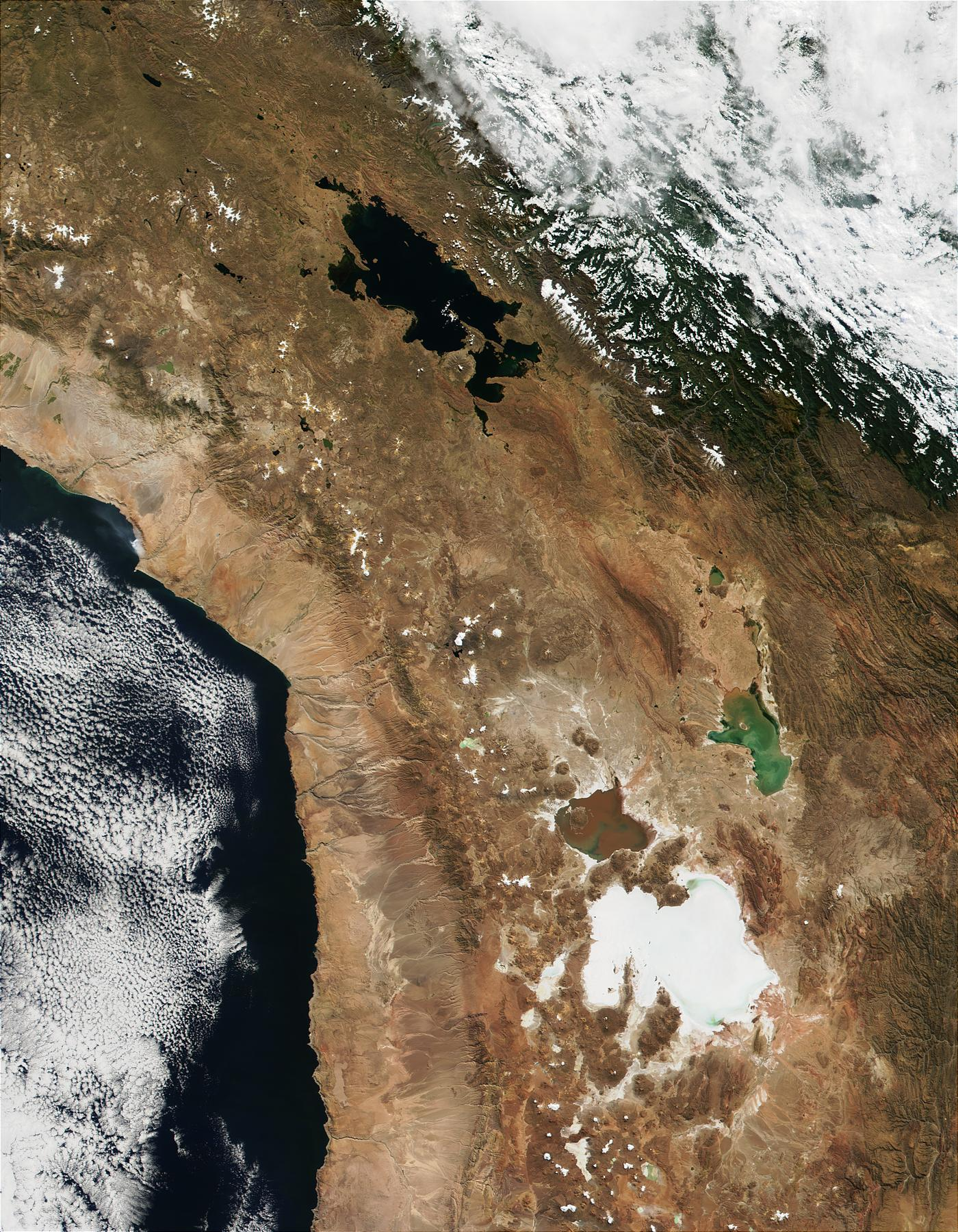
MODIS satellite image from November 2001, showing Lake Titicaca, the Salar de Uyuni, and the Salar de Coipasa, major features of the endorheic Altiplano basin in Bolivia and Peru.

- Laguna del Carbón, in Gran Bajo de San Julián, Argentina – the lowest point in the Western and Southern hemispheres
- Lake Mar Chiquita in Argentina
- The Altiplano includes a number of closed basins such as the Salar de Coipasa, and Titicaca–Poopó system
- Lake Valencia, in Venezuela
- Salar de Atacama, in the Atacama Desert, Chile

=== Antarctica ===
Endorheic lakes exist in Antarctica's McMurdo Dry Valleys, Victoria Land, the largest ice-free area.

- Don Juan Pond in Wright Valley is fed by groundwater from a rock glacier and remains unfrozen throughout the year.
- Lake Vanda in Wright Valley has a perennial ice cover, the edges of which melt in the summer, allowing flow from the longest river in Antarctica, the Onyx River. The lake is over 70 m deep and is hypersaline.
- Lake Bonney is in Taylor Valley and has a perennial ice cover and two lobes separated by the Bonney Riegel. Glacial melt and discharge from Blood Falls feed the lake. Its unique glacial history has resulted in hypersaline brine in the bottom waters and fresh water at the surface.
- Lake Hoare, in Taylor Valley, is the freshest of the Dry Valley lakes, receiving its melt almost exclusively from the Canada Glacier. The lake has an ice cover and forms a moat during the Austral summer.
- Lake Fryxell is adjacent to the Ross Sea in Taylor Valley. The lake has an ice cover and receives its water from numerous glacial meltwater streams for approximately six weeks out of the year. Its salinity increases with depth.

== Ancient ==
Some of Earth's ancient endorheic systems and lakes include:

- The Black Sea, until its merger with the Mediterranean.
- The Mediterranean Sea itself and all its tributary basins, during its Messinian desiccation (approximately five million years ago) as it became disconnected from the Atlantic Ocean.
- The Orcadian Basin in Scotland during the Devonian period. Now identifiable as lacustrine sediments buried around and off the coast.
- Lake Tanganyika in Africa. Currently high enough to connect to rivers entering the sea.
- Lake Lahontan in North America.
- Lake Bonneville in North America. The basin was not always endorheic; at times, it overflowed through Red Rock Pass to the Snake River and the sea.
- Lake Chewaucan in North America.
- Tularosa Basin and Lake Cabeza de Vaca in North America. The basin was formerly much larger than it is today, including the ancestral Rio Grande north of Texas, which fed a large lake area.
- Ebro and Duero basins, draining most of northern Spain during the Neogene and perhaps Pliocene. Climate change and erosion of the Catalan coastal mountains, as well as the deposition of alluvium in the terminal lake, allowed the Ebro basin to overflow into the sea during the middle-to-late Miocene.

== See also ==
- Bolson – Desert valley or depression
- List of endorheic basins
- Triple divide
