= Qum (disambiguation) =

Qum or Qom is a city in Iran.

Qum may also refer to:

- Qom, Razavi Khorasan, a village in Razavi Khorasan Province, Iran
- Qum, Azerbaijan
- Qum Island, an island in the Bay of Baku, in the Caspian Sea
