= Central Asian Internal Drainage Basin (Mongolia) =

Endorheic basin in Mongolia

Map of the main drainage basins and rivers of Mongolia.

The Central Asian Internal Drainage Basin or Central Asian Inland Basin is the largest of 3 major hydrological basins that cover Mongolia (cf. Arctic Drainage Basin & Pacific Drainage Basin). It is an endorheic basin. It is further subdivided into local drainage basins.

The basin also includes much of the Western and Central Asia: the watersheds of the Great Lakes Depression, the Valley of Lakes, and the lowlands of the Gobi Desert. It is separated from the other two basins by the ridges of the Khangai Mountains and Khentii Mountains. The Khentii Mountains also separate Arctic and Pacific basins within Mongolia.

== See also ==
- List of drainage basins by area
