= Sebkha Azzel Matti =

The Sebkha Azzel Matti is an endorheic basin in central Algeria, North Africa.
