= Nkom =

Nkom may refer to:

- The Kom language (Cameroon), a Bantoid language spoken by the Kom people
- The Norwegian Communications Authority (Norwegian: Nasjonal kommnikasjonsmyndighet; abbreviated as Nkom)
- Alice Nkom, Cameroonian lawyer, politician, and human rights activist
- Andrew Nkom, Nigerian professor, educationist, administrator, and writer

== See also ==
- Kom (disambiguation)
