= Qom River =

River in Iran

Coordinates: 34°29′02″N 51°34′35″E

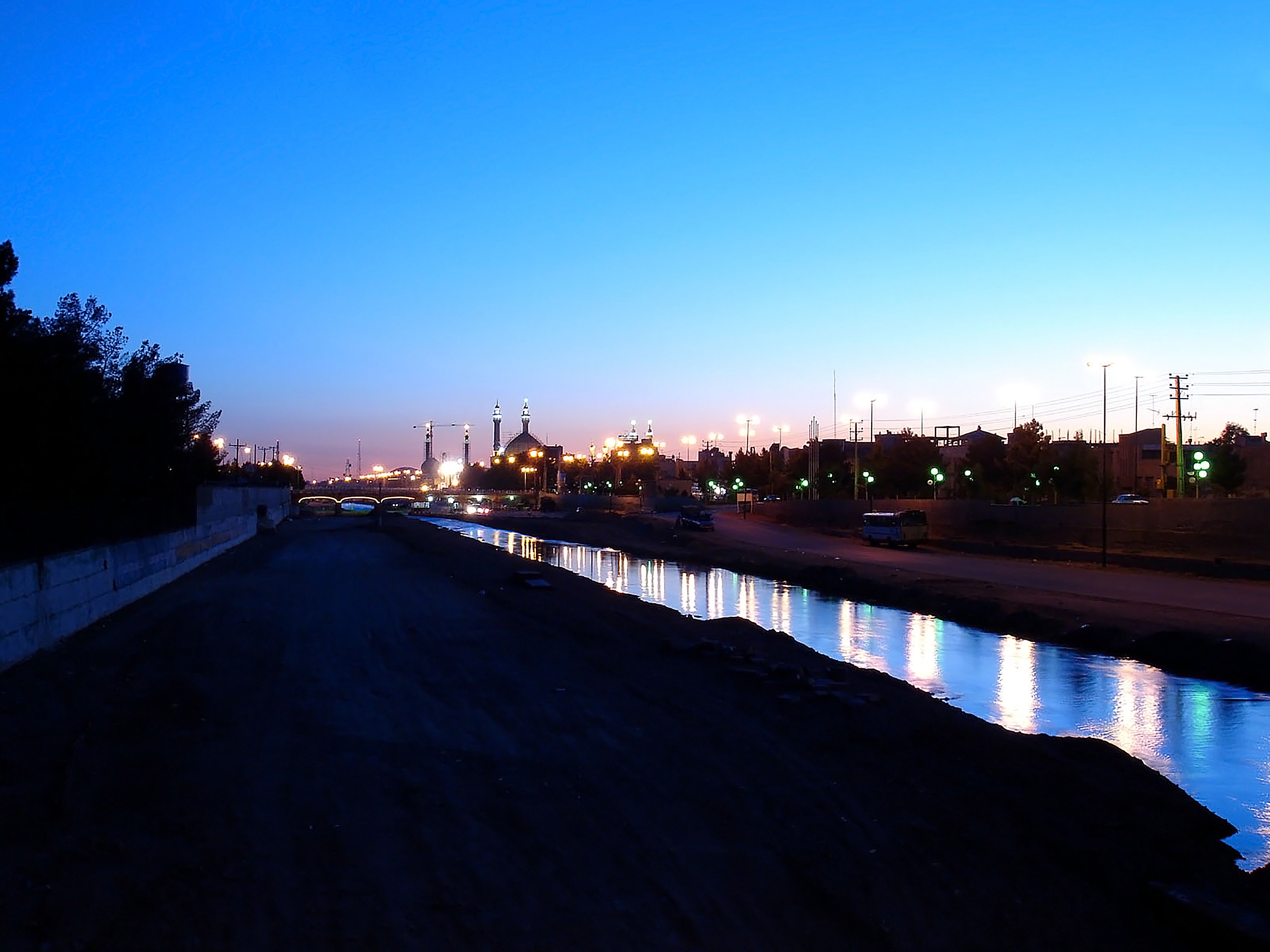

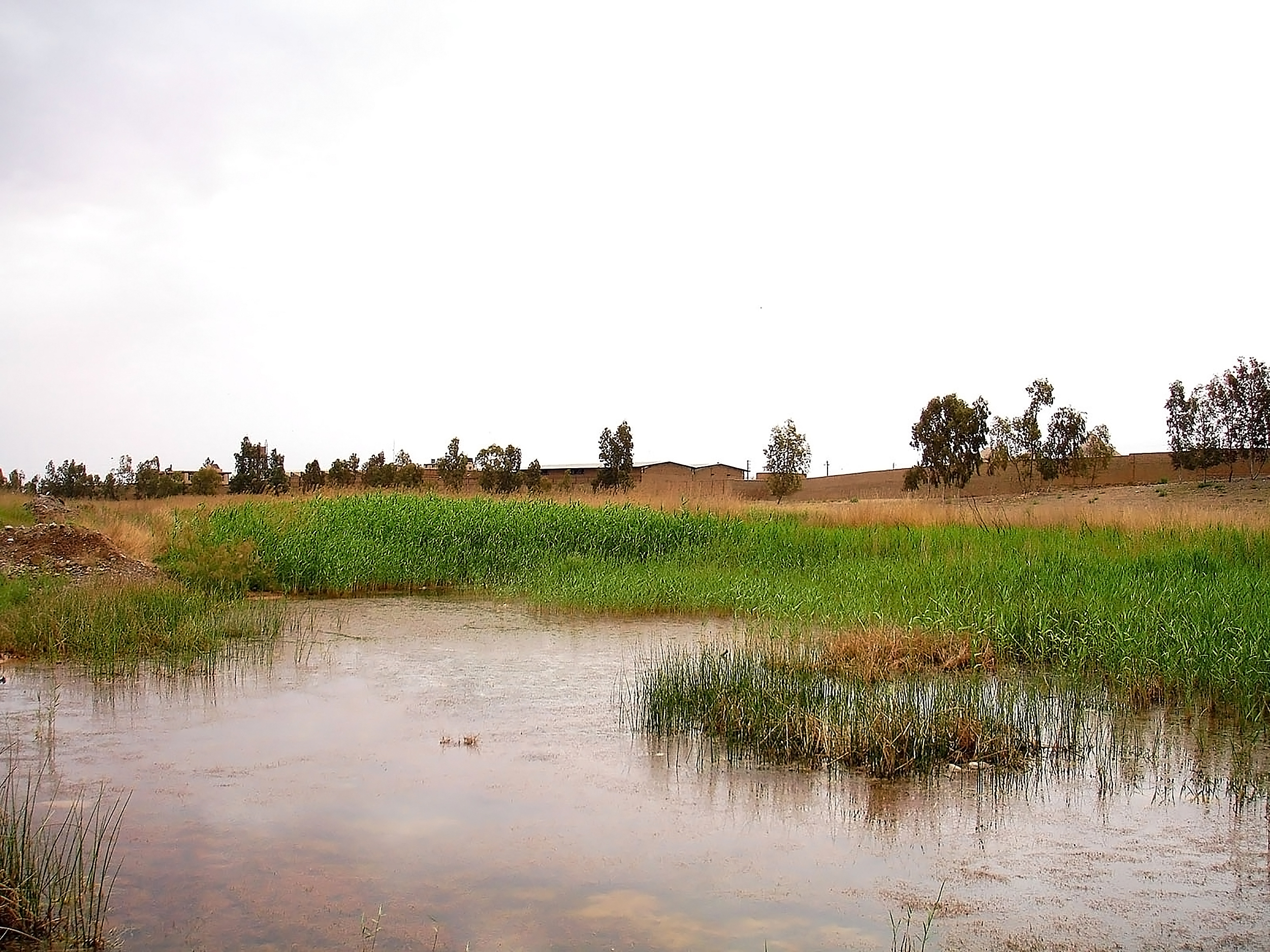

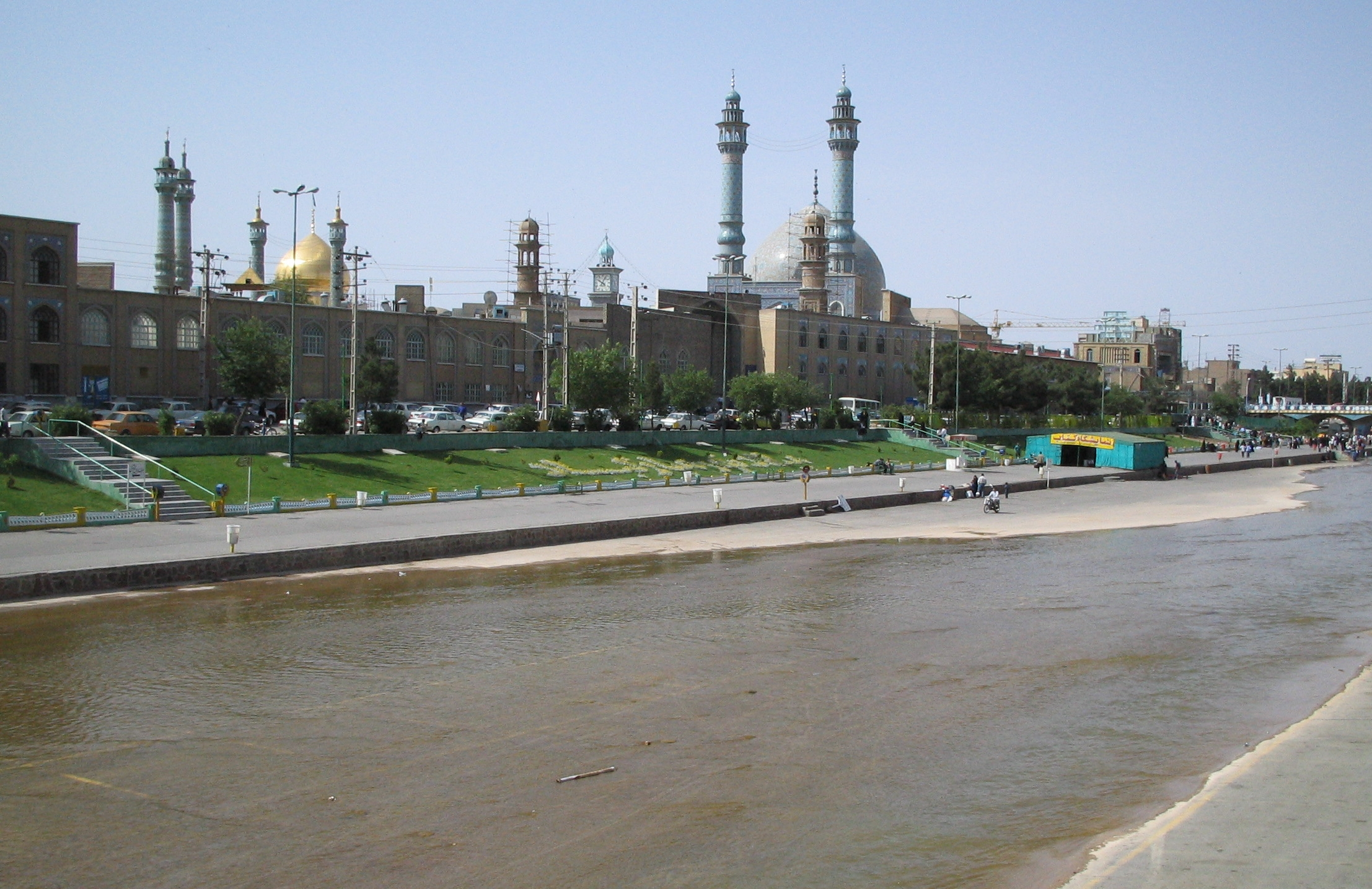
The Qom River flowing beside the shrine of Massoumeh Qom.

The Qom River or Qom Roud (Persian: رودخانه قم‌رود), originally Golshan River (گلشن رود ”Flowering River”), is a large river in Iran that receives its water from the Zagros Mountains and mounds into the Namak Lake. The Qom River flows through the city of Qom, and together with the Qareh Su it gains a length of approximately 400 km (250 mi). The water level fluctuates greatly, between 312 m³/s and only 4 m³/s. This is partially the effect of the use of the Qom water for irrigation.

In 2014, the World Resources Institute ranked the Qom basin as "extremely high" for water stress.
