= Lac du Lauvitel =

Lake in Isère, France

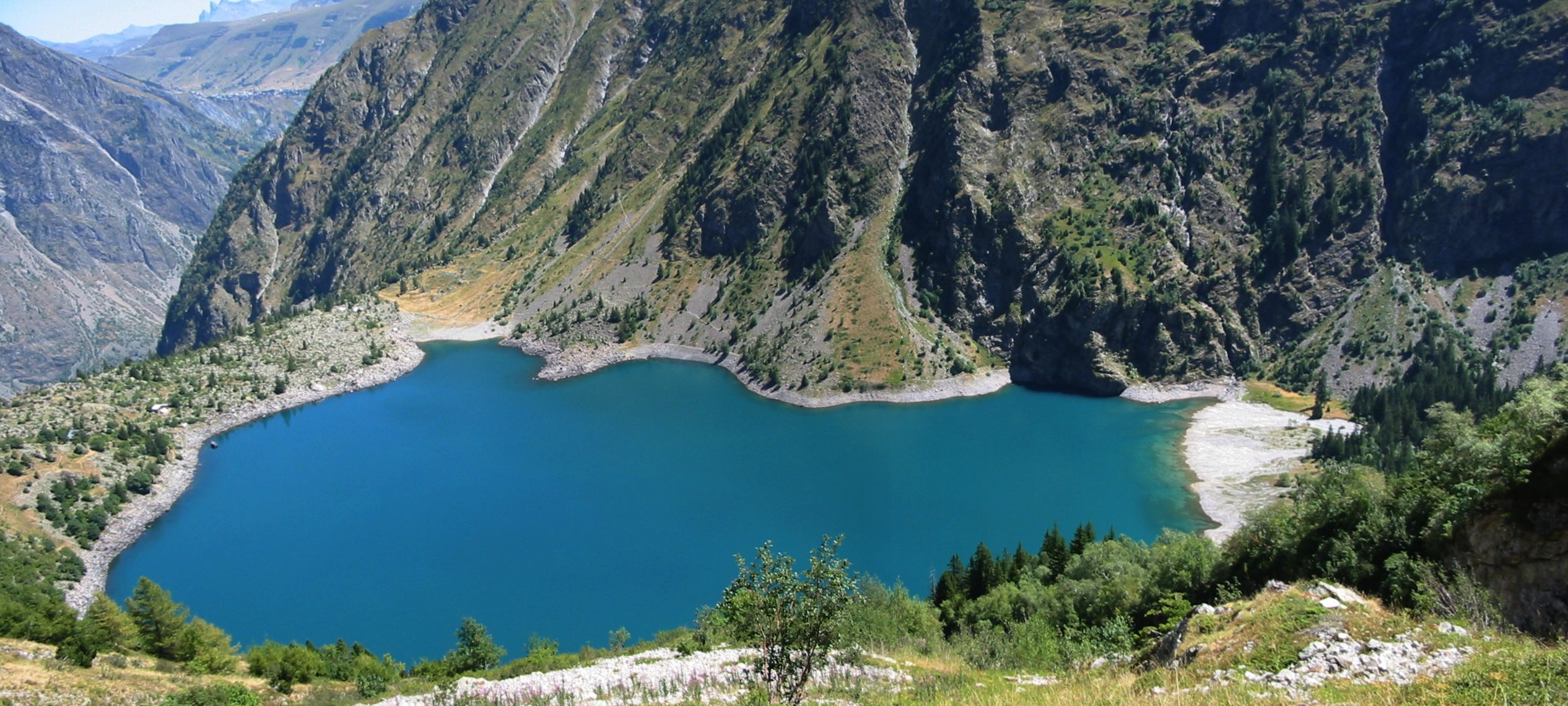

- Location within France
- Location: Le Bourg-d'Oisans, Isère
- Coordinates: 44°58′10″N 6°3′53″E
- Basin countries: France
- Surface area: 35 ha (86 acres)
- Max. depth: 68 m (223 ft)
- Surface elevation: 1,530 m (5,020 ft)

Lac du Lauvitel is a lake in the commune of Le Bourg-d'Oisans in the Isère department of France. At an elevation of 1530 m, the lake has a surface area of 0.35 km^{2}. It is situated in the Vénéon valley. It is the largest lake of the Écrins massif and forms one slope of the Oisans region. The lake is accessible by foot from the nearby town of la Danchère.

The southern part of the lake and valley are classified as part of a "réserve naturelle intégrale" since 1995. This classification aims to preserve such areas in their natural state as if entirely unaffected by human activity. This restricted area is forbidden to visitors and is instead reserved exclusively for scientific research, having been recognised in 2012 as an essential protected area for its scientific importance according to an assessment by the International Union for Conservation of Nature.

== Geography ==
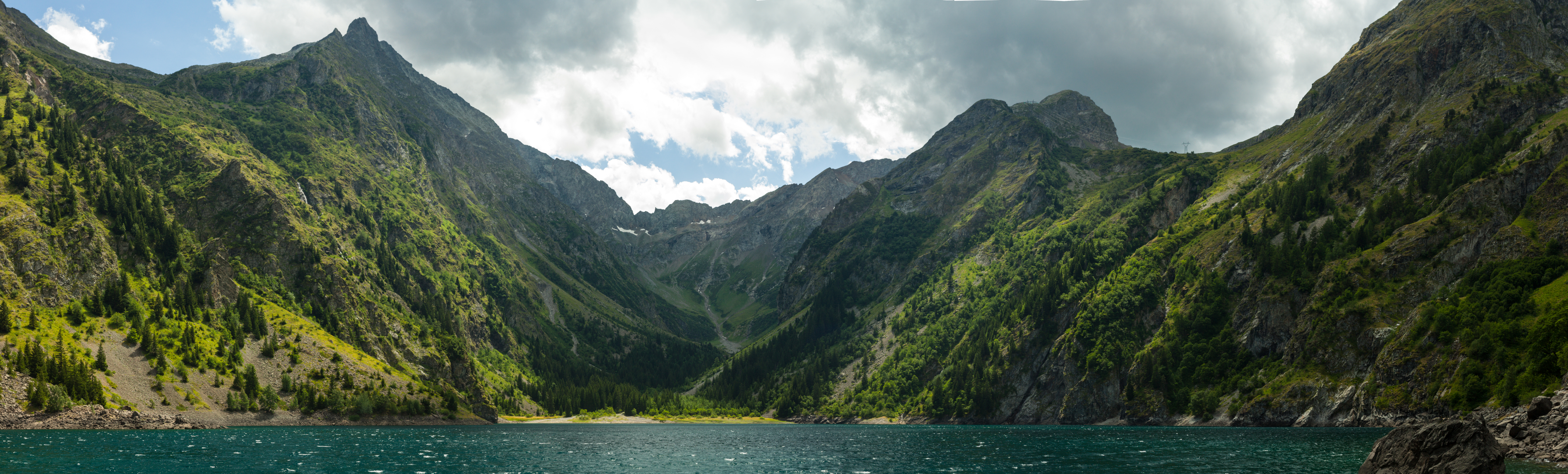
A view of the lake from the north-eastern shore.

The surface of the lake varies from approximately 25 to 35 hectares and its depth reaches 65 m. The natural water-retaining dam appeared approximately 4000 years ago, when a rockslide added material on top of a pre-existing glacial moraine.

In winter, the surface ice layer is over one meter thick. For most of the year, no surface water escapes from the lake. During snowmelt periods however, the meltwater flow from the surrounding summits into the lake is well over the porous flow capacity of the lake barrier. As a result, the depth of the lake can increase by 20 m compared to its summer level, until it overflows.
