= Choelquoit Lake =

Lake in British Columbia, Canada

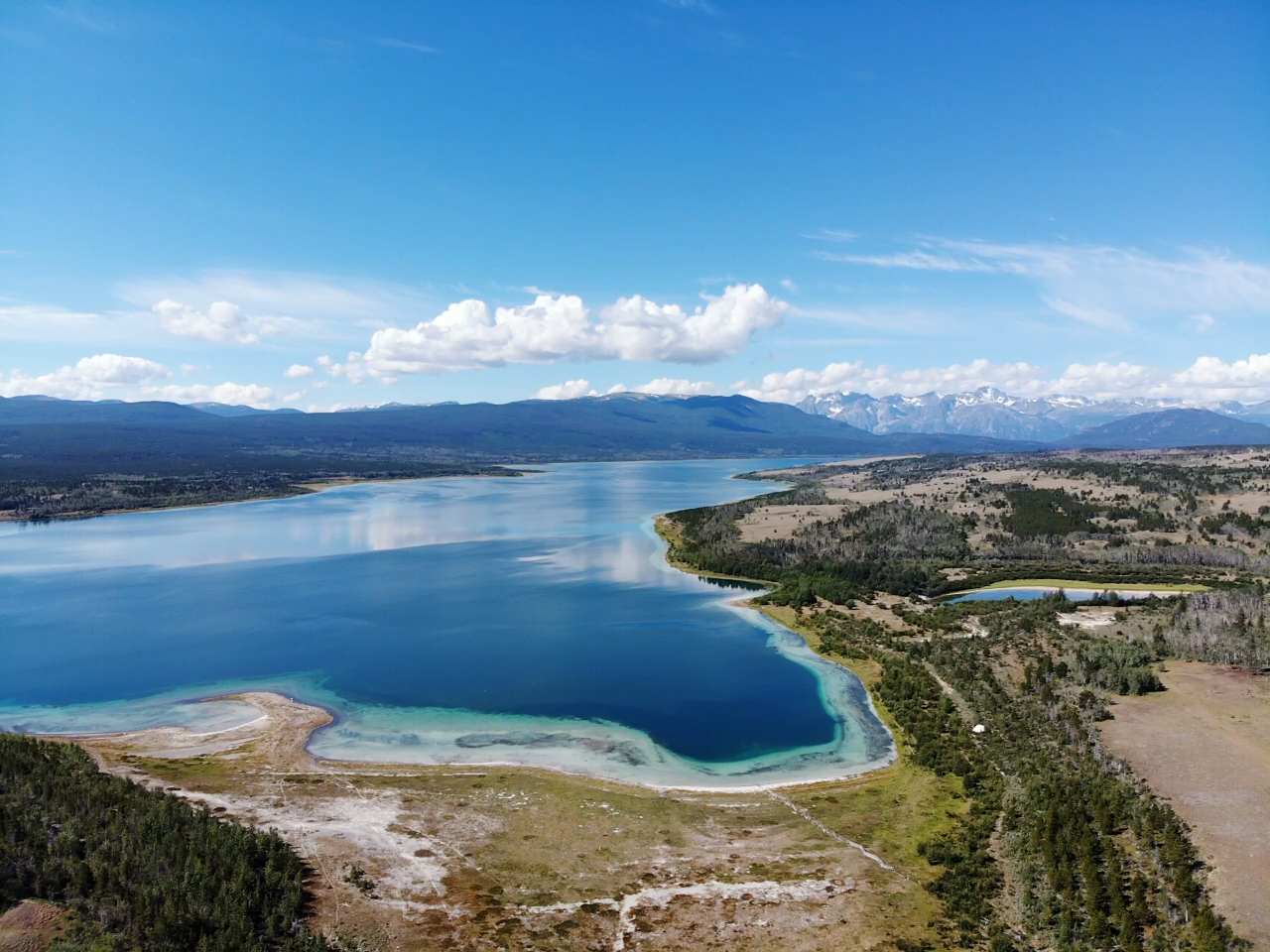
- Looking west over Choelquoit Lake

- Location within British Columbia
- Location: Chilcotin District, British Columbia
- Coordinates: 51°42′20″N 124°12′42″W
- Primary outflows: none
- Basin countries: Canada
- Max. length: 9.5 km (5.9 mi)
- Max. width: 1.65 km (1.03 mi)
- Surface area: 14.3 km^{2} (5.5 sq mi)
- Average depth: 18.0 m (59.1 ft)
- Max. depth: 44.2 m (145 ft)
- Water volume: 0.26 km^{3} (0.062 mi^{3})
- Residence time: No outflow
- Shore length^{1}: 31.7 km (19.7 mi)
- Surface elevation: 1,172 m (3,845 ft)
- References: ,
- ^{1} Shore length is not a well-defined measure.

Choelquoit lake is an endorheic lake in the western Chilcotin District of the Central Interior of British Columbia, Canada, located north of Chilko Lake, west of Tatlayoko Lake, and west of Williams Lake. The lake is the largest high elevation lake in Canada without an outflow, and sits on the western edge of the Chilcotin plateau, surrounded by grasslands, pine forest, and views of the snow-capped Niut Mountains.

There is a camp site on the east side of the lake.

== See also ==
- List of lakes of British Columbia
