= Qom, Razavi Khorasan =

Qom قم
- Village
- Location within Iran
- Coordinates: 36°42′36″N 59°06′03″E
- Country: Iran
- Province: Razavi Khorasan
- County: Chenaran
- Bakhsh: Central
- Rural District: Chenaran

Population (2006)
  - Total: 38
- Time zone: UTC+3:30 (IRST)
  - Summer (DST): UTC+4:30 (IRDT)

Qom (Persian: قم, also Romanized as Qūm) is a village in Chenaran Rural District, in the Central District of Chenaran County, Razavi Khorasan Province, Iran. At the 2006 census, its population was 38, in 10 families.
