= Martin Lake (British Columbia) =

Lake in British Columbia, Canada

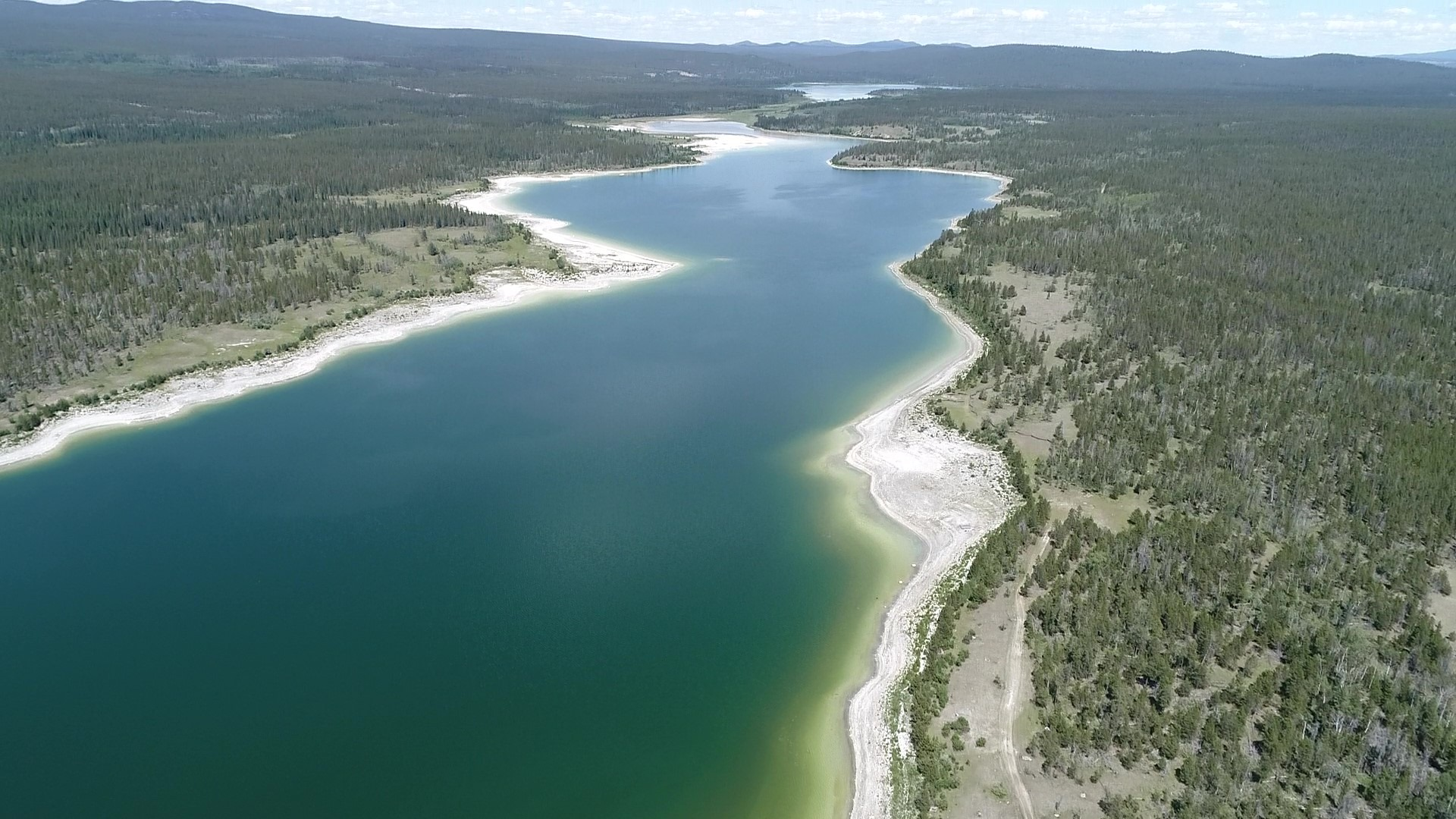
- Aerial View of Martin Lake

- Location within British Columbia

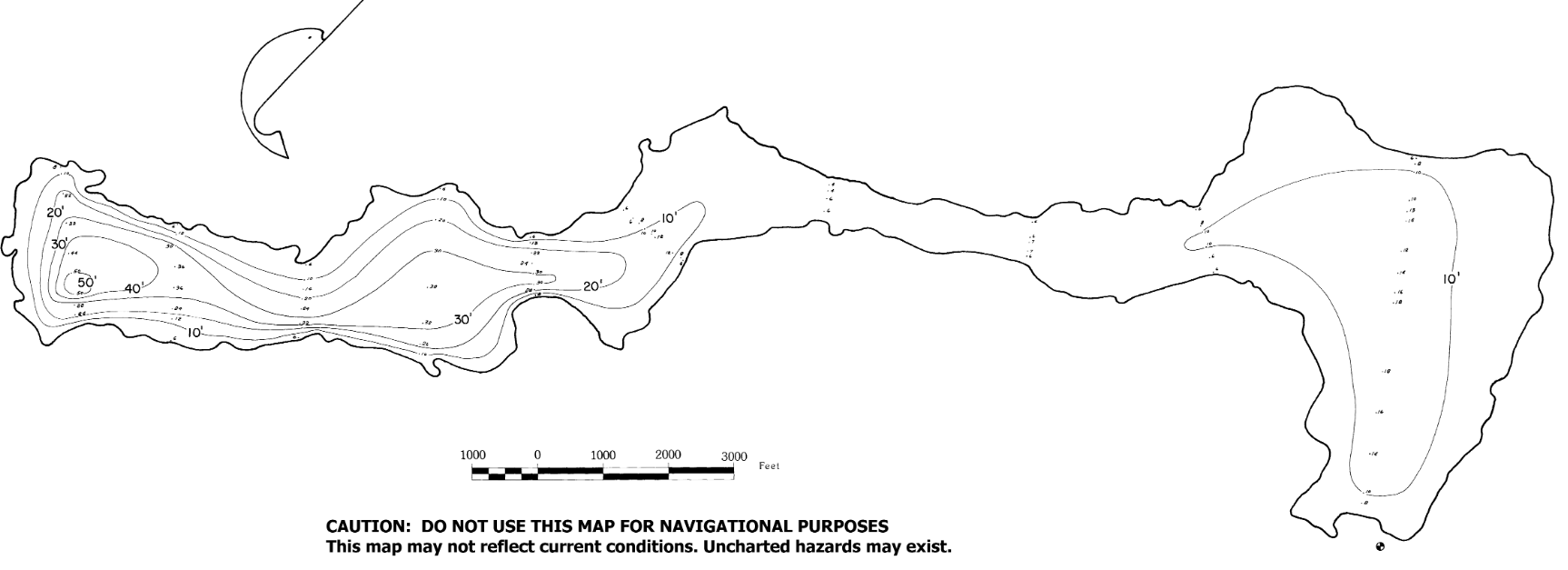
- Bathymetric view of Martin Lake
- Location: British Columbia
- Coordinates: 51°57′N 124°35′W
- Primary inflows: Seven seasonal streams
- Primary outflows: None
- Basin countries: Canada
- Max. length: 7 km (4.3 mi)
- Max. width: 2 km (1.2 mi)
- Surface area: 4.7188 km^{2} (1.8219 sq mi)
- Average depth: 3.7 m (12 ft)
- Max. depth: 15.2 m (50 ft)
- Water volume: 0.01746 cubic kilometres (0.00419 mi^{3})
- Residence time: No outflow
- Shore length^{1}: 20.8 km (12.9 mi)
- Surface elevation: 969 m (3,179 ft)
- Islands: None
- Settlements: Tatla Lake, British Columbia
- ^{1} Shore length is not a well-defined measure.

Martin Lake is an endorheic freshwater lake in the West Chilcotin area of British Columbia, Canada, situated just north of the community of Tatla Lake, British Columbia. This small alkaline lake has no physical outflow (Martin Lake Creek flows underground) and the water level has been dropping slowly over time. Since the 1980s the lake has divided into two separate lakes with a land bridge between them.

The lake is popular with swimmers in the summer because the shallow depths and lack of inflow and outflow keeps the warmer than other lakes in the Chilcotin. The annual Tatla Lake gymkhana is held every June at the shores of Martin Lake.

The area around Martin Lake is a popular cross country skiing spot with numerous trails linking downtown Tatla Lake and the school with Martin Lake.

== Physical features of the area ==
Martin Lake is located on the Chilcotin Plateau at 968m above sea level. The land is flat around the lake, making it ideal for cross country skiing. The dry climate allows for open grasslands interspersed among the lodgepole pine-dominant forest. The open grasslands along with the old abandoned airstrip allow for excellent views of the slow capped Coast Mountains.

It is quite common to find the famous Chilcotin wild horses in the area.

The water is quite basic with a pH of 8.5. The amount of total dissolved solids at the surface is the highest of any lake in the Chilcotin at 757 ppm. This means the water is very hard.

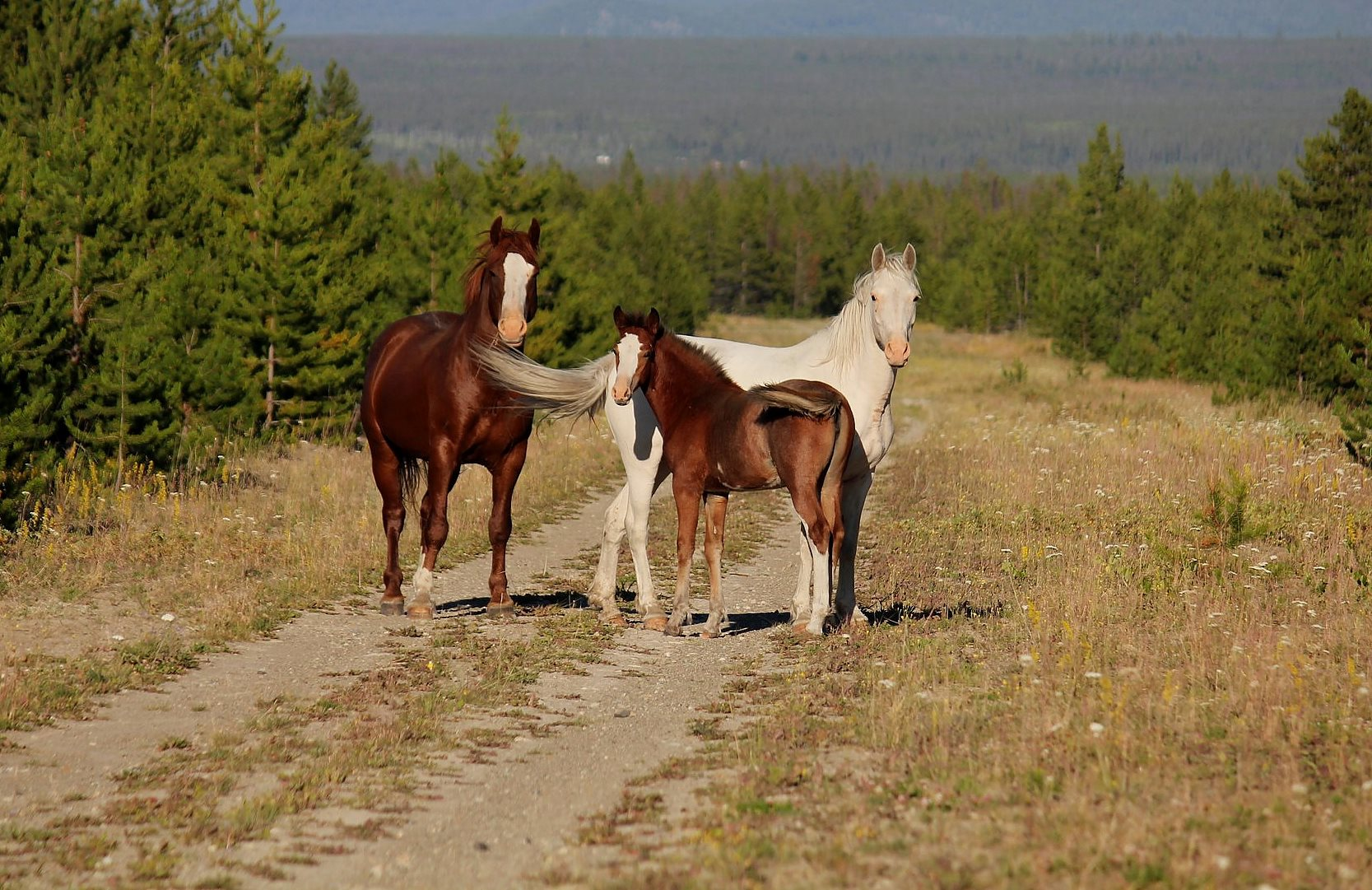
A family of wild horses on the nearby abandoned airstrip

== See also ==
- List of lakes of British Columbia
