= Eagle Lake (British Columbia) =

Lake in British Columbia, Canada

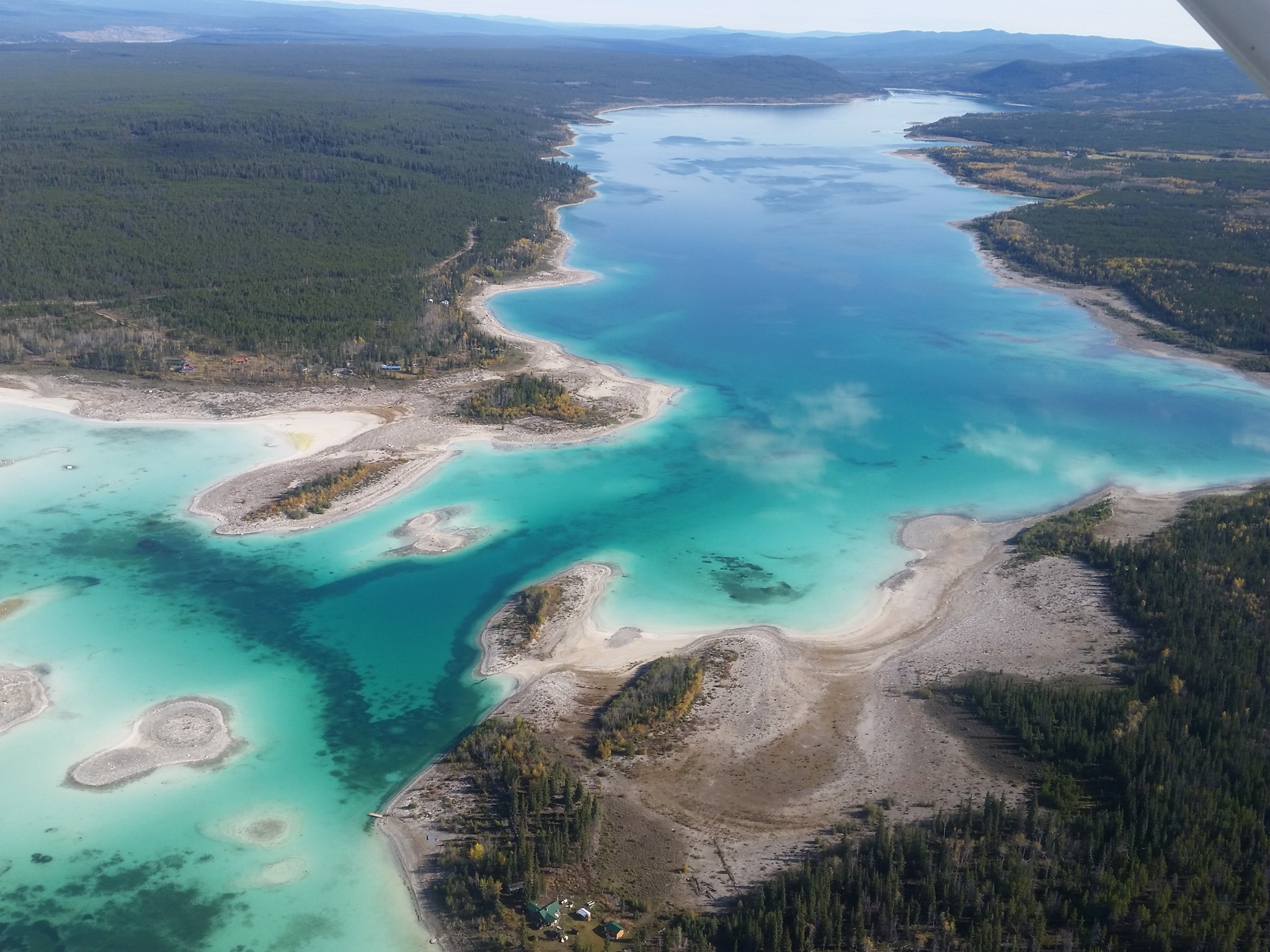
- Aerial View of Eagle Lake

- Location within British Columbia
- Location: Chilcotin District, British Columbia
- Coordinates: 51°54′47″N 124°23′13″W
- Primary outflows: Evaporation
- Basin countries: Canada
- Max. length: 10 km (6.2 mi)
- Max. width: 1.5 km (0.93 mi)
- Surface area: 11.9 km^{2} (4.6 sq mi)
- Average depth: 17.9 m (59 ft)
- Max. depth: 48 m (157 ft)
- Water volume: 0.21 km^{3} (0.050 mi^{3})
- Residence time: No outflow
- Shore length^{1}: 29.3 km (18.2 mi)
- Surface elevation: 1,042 m (3,419 ft)
- Islands: 5 in 1970 with the number fluctuating up and down as the water level drops.
- ^{1} Shore length is not a well-defined measure.

Eagle Lake (officially named Lhuy Nachasgwen Gunlin) is an endorheic lake in the western Chilcotin District of the Central Interior of British Columbia, Canada, located southeast of Tatla Lake and west of the city of Williams Lake. On 11 June 2020 the name of the lake was officially changed to its traditional Tŝilhqot'in name, Lhuy Nachasgwen Gunlin, which means "where there are many small fish." The lake is a popular summer location with warm, sky-blue water, and white sand beaches. The lake has no outflow, and the water level continues to recede over time. Since 1970, the lake level has dropped over 6m (as of 2018). This means that the former Islands are now connected to the shoreline and new Islands have been created on the western bay.

The water is very clear, giving a very high Secchi depth of 13.4 m (44 ft), possibly the highest in the province.

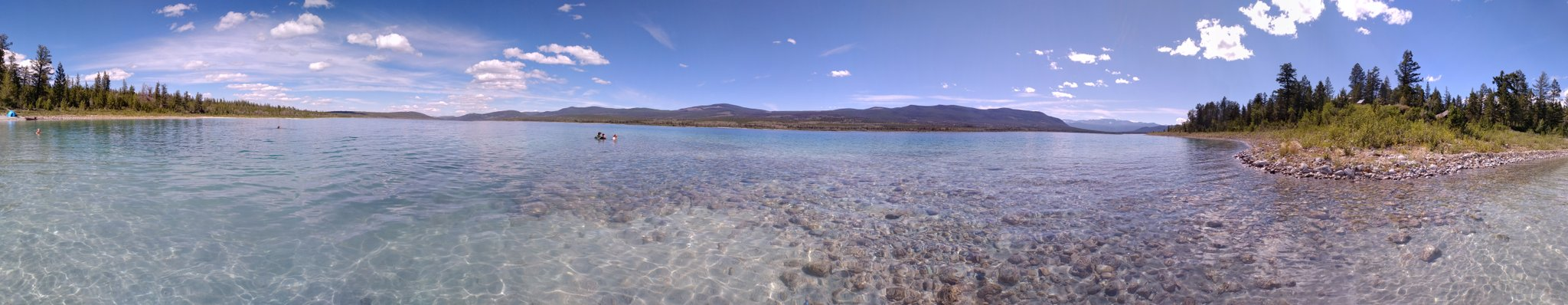

== See also ==
- List of lakes of British Columbia
