= Namak Lake =

Salt lake in Qom Province, Iran

- Location within Iran
- Interactive map of Namak Lake
- Location: 40% in Aran va bidgol County ( Isfahan province ) 30% in Qom province 30% in Semnan province
- Coordinates: 34°30′N 51°52′E
- Type: Salt lake
- Part of: Great Salt Desert
- Primary inflows: Qom River
- Primary outflows: Evaporation
- Basin countries: Iran
- Surface area: 1,800 km^{2} (690 sq mi)
- Max. depth: 1 m (3 ft 3 in)
- Surface elevation: 790 m (2,590 ft)
- Islands: Sargardan island
- Settlements: Aran va bidgol

Namak Lake (Persian: دریاچه نمک, romanized: Daryâče-ye Namak, lit. 'Salt Lake') is a salt lake in Iran on the Western edge of the Great Salt Desert (Dasht-e Kavir). It is located approximately 100 km (62 mi) east of the city of Qom and 60 km (37 mi) of Aran va bidgol at an elevation of 790 metres (2,590 ft) above sea level.

The lake has a surface area of about 1,800 km^{2} (690 sq mi), but most of this is dry. Water only covers 1 km^{2} (0.4 sq mi). The lake only reaches a depth between 45 centimetres (17.72 in) to 1 metre (39.37 in).

== Environmental characteristics ==
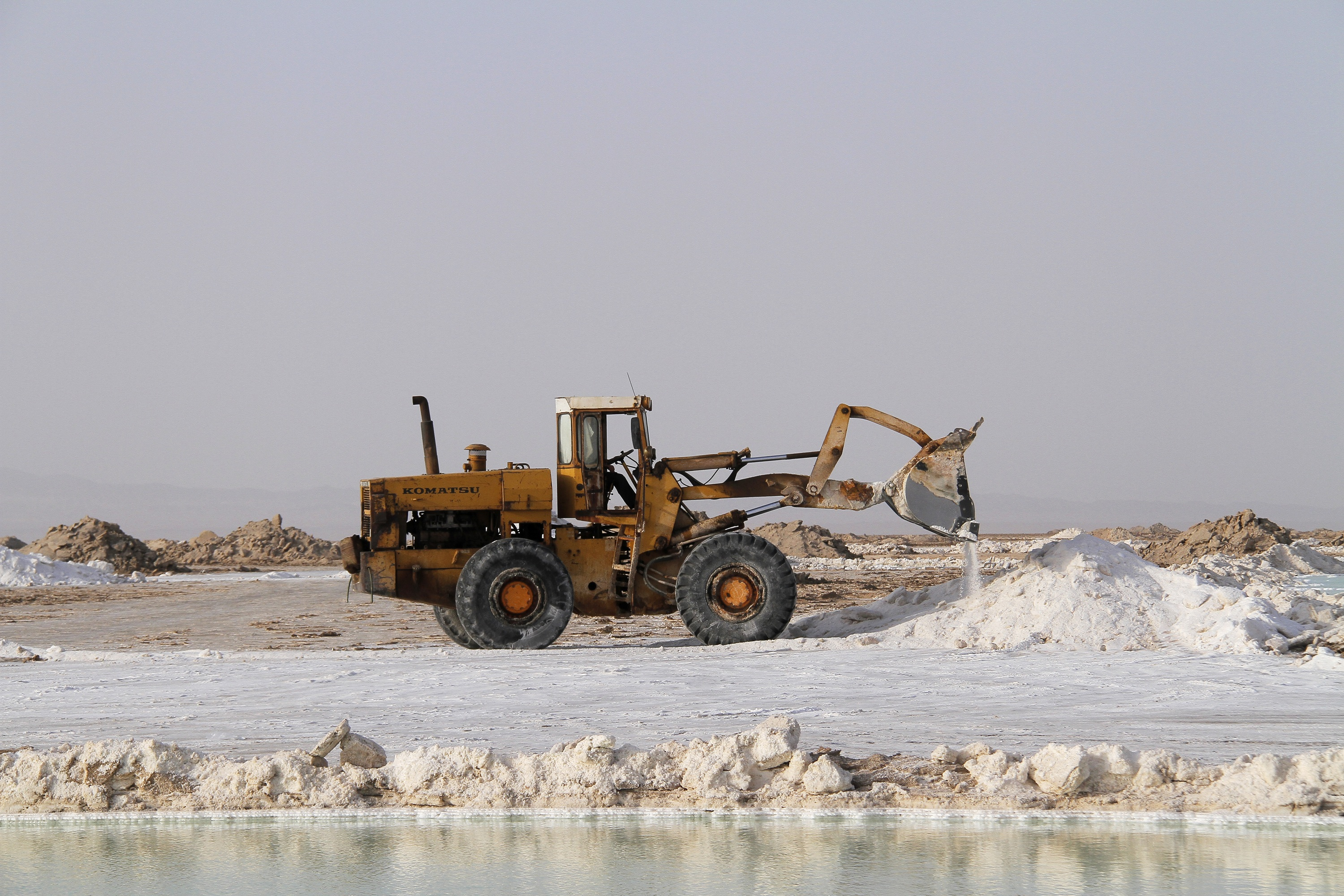

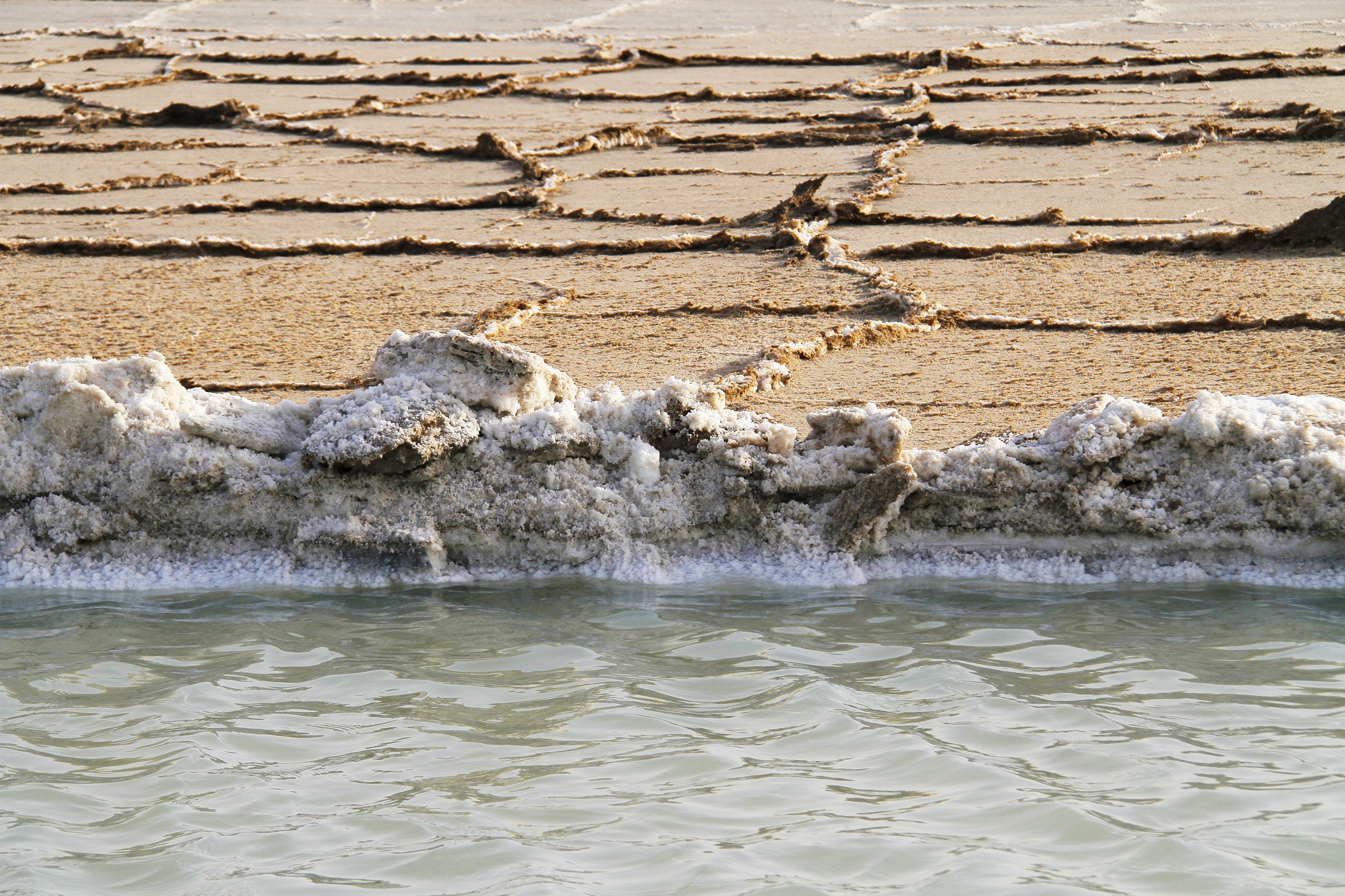

The air in this area is very dry. Due to the high rate of evaporation and very high salinity of the water, Qom's salt lake has a desert-like structure and is covered with thick layers of salt. Also, this lake is known as the habitat of some special plant and animal species that have the ability to live in the harsh and salty conditions of this region.

Aliabad Caravanserai, Red Castle, Desert National Park, Sefidab Caravanserai and Manzariyeh Caravanserai are some of the sightseeing places in Qom around Namak Lake.
