= Lake Manix =

Lake in San Bernardino County, California

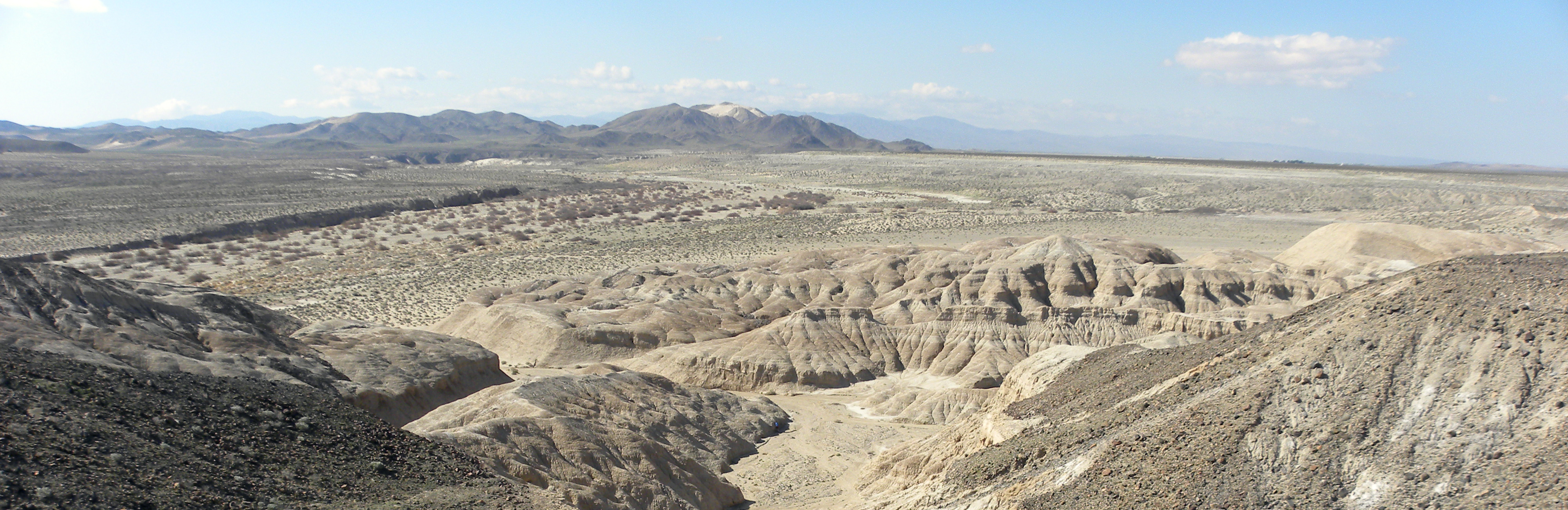

- Location within California
- Location: Mojave Desert
- Coordinates: 35°00′N 116°35′W
- Type: Pluvial lake
- Etymology: After the nearby Manix railway station
- Part of: Mojave River system
- Primary inflows: Mojave River, local washes
- Primary outflows: Mojave River through Afton Canyon, Baxter Wash or Bristol Lake less likely
- Surface area: 236 square kilometres (91 sq mi)
- Max. depth: 60 metres (200 ft)
- Water volume: 1.6–3.2 cubic kilometres (0.38–0.77 cu mi)
- Surface elevation: 543 metres (1,781 ft) usually
- Settlements: Yermo, California, Newberry Springs, California,

Lake Manix is a former lake fed by the Mojave River in the Mojave Desert. It lies within San Bernardino County, California, United States. Located close to Barstow, this lake had the shape of a cloverleaf and covered four basins named Coyote, Cady/Manix, Troy and Afton. It covered a surface area of 236 square kilometres (91 sq mi) and reached an altitude of 543 metres (1,781 ft) at highstands, although poorly recognizable shorelines have been found at altitudes of 547–558 metres (1,795–1,831 ft). The lake was fed by increased runoff during the Pleistocene and overflowed into the Lake Mojave basin and from there to Lake Manly in Death Valley, or less likely into the Bristol Lake basin and from there to the Colorado River.

The lake formed about 500,000 years before present, when the Mojave River left the Victorville area and started to drain into Manix and Lake Harper. The lake did not immediately include the Afton basin; its integration occurred only about 190,000 years ago, most likely due to a catastrophic flood. Lake Manix lasted until 25,000–13,800 years ago, when Afton Canyon formed, either through slow downcutting or a large outburst flood.

The lake supported a rich ecosystem, including birds, fish, mammals and plants. A group of archeological finds in the area have been called, controversially, the "Lake Manix Industry".

== Name ==
The name "Lake Manix" was bestowed upon the lake by J. P. Buwalda in 1913; Buwalda also named its fossil-bearing sediments "Manix Beds" and today the lake sediments are named "Manix Formation". The name was derived from the Manix railroad siding of the Union Pacific, east of Barstow.

== Geography ==
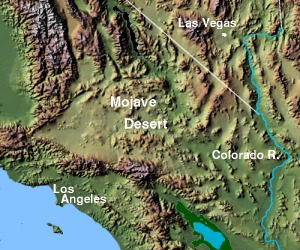
Location of the Mojave Desert

Lake Manix was located 32–64 kilometres (20–40 mi) east of present-day Barstow and Daggett. It had a cloverleaf shape, formed by a central Cady or Manix basin, a northwestern Coyote Basin, a south-southeastern Troy Basin and an eastern-northeastern Afton Basin. The latter basin is heavily dissected in comparison to the others. These basins were at various points separated from each other by sills. In the older history of the lake another basin named Cady Basin existed, before the Mojave River eroded through the Buwalda Ridge and connected it to the Afton Basin. This through-going erosion may have been assisted by the Manix Fault trace. A bedrock sill at 540 metres (1,770 ft) separates the Coyote Basin from the rest of the lake basin. The total surface area of the lake is given by sources as 236 square kilometres (91 sq mi). Earlier highstands may have reached Yermo, California. Yermo, together with Dunn and Newberry Springs, are present-day towns whose locations would have been close to the shore of, or submerged beneath, Lake Manix.

The upper threshold of the lake reached 543 metres (1,781 ft) above sea level; a shoreline at 549 metres (1,801 ft) was later shown to be an error of measurement, although some poorly recognizable higher shorelines at 547–558 metres (1,795–1,831 ft) have been found that are attributed to earlier highstands. The stability of the 543-metre (1,781 ft) shoreline suggests that the lake either became much larger at that point or started to overflow. These shorelines are marked by beach bars and wavecut scarps, and at least one lagoon formed behind a beach bar. Other landforms include alluvial fans, deltas, mudflats and their deposits. Part of the shoreline was buried by deposits transported by the Mojave River; these include large parts of a 557-metre-high (1,827 ft) shoreline. One island potentially existed in the middle of the lake; at a lake surface elevation of 558 metres (1,831 ft), the island would have become two islands separated by a narrow strait. The lake reached a depth of 60 metres (200 ft) and was surrounded by alluvial fans which formed around the subbasins of Lake Manix.

The lake was surrounded by mountain chains: in clockwise order, the Cronese Mountains, the Cave Mountains, the Cady Mountains, the Newberry Mountains, the Calico Mountains and the Alvord Mountains. These mountains are formed by sediments and volcanic rocks with ages ranging from Paleozoic to Tertiary and contributed sediments to Lake Manix. The whole region was subject to strong tectonically driven deformation from the Eastern California Shear Zone. A number of faults in the region show evidence of Holocene activity, including the Calico Fault, the Camp Rock Fault, the Dolores Lake Fault, the Pisgah Fault and the Manix Fault. This last fault probably contributed to the formation of the drainage by shearing rocks along its path.

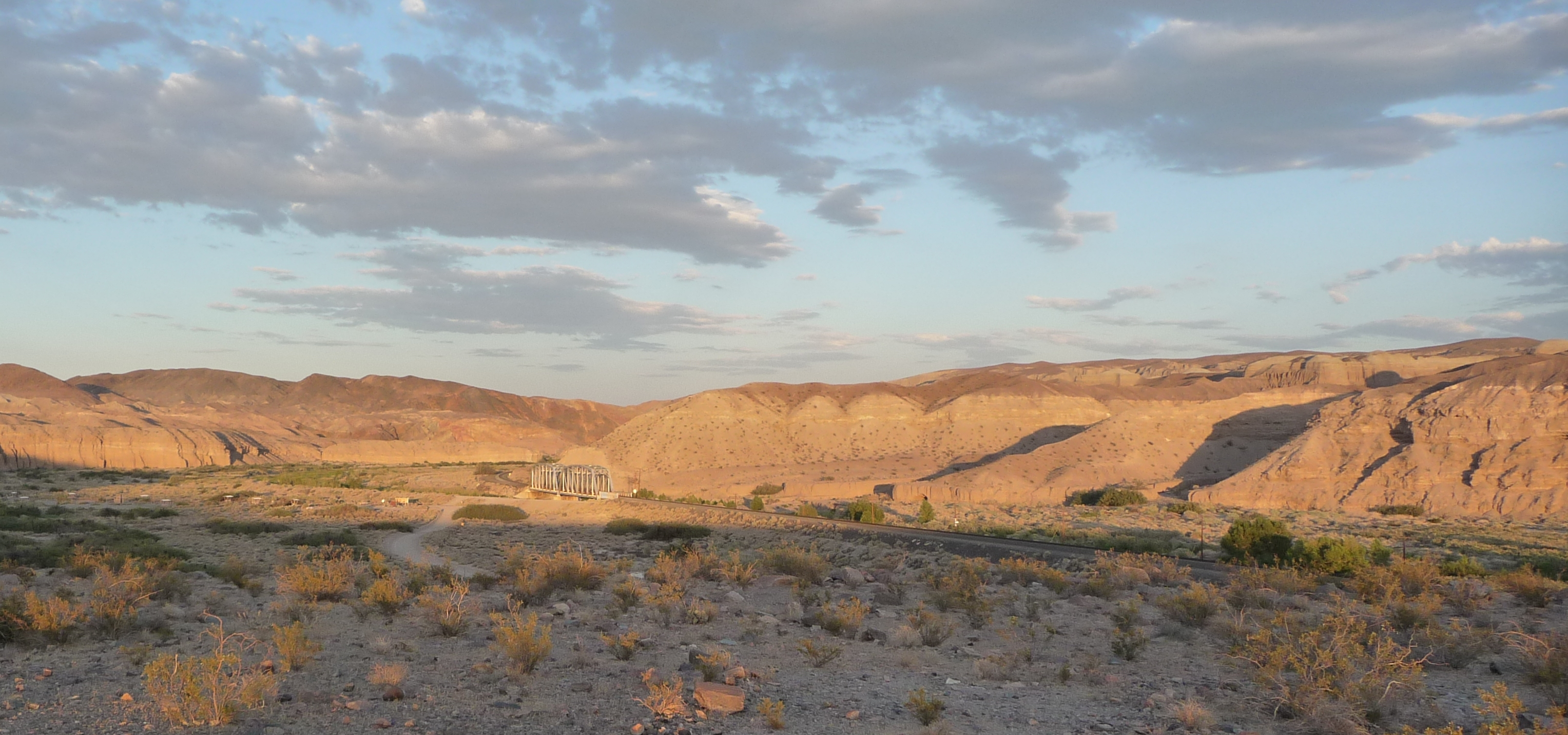
Lake Manix looking towards Afton Canyon

Distorted sediments, soil liquefaction remnants and sand blows have been identified in drilling cores from Lake Manix sediments; distorted sediments may be evidence that seismic activity occurred in the lake during its history. Earthquakes may have occurred on the several faults close to the lake and across the lake floor. The 1947 Manix earthquake occurred along the Manix fault.

The Mojave River entered the lake from the west, probably forming a river delta. The most recent drainage from the lake was Afton Canyon, which drained the lake east towards Soda Lake, Silver Lake and eventually Death Valley. This draining cut 120 metres (390 ft) deep into the sediments of Lake Manix, removing about 2.815 cubic kilometres (0.675 cu mi) of material and depositing it below Afton Canyon. The erosion has exposed sediments of Lake Manix, making their climatic records accessible to research.

The playas of Coyote Lake and Troy Lake presently fill the eponymous basins of Lake Manix. In many places, wind- and water-driven erosion has removed deposits from Lake Manix and obscured shorelines. The present-day Interstate 40 and Interstate 15 cross the former lake bed of Lake Manix.

== Hydrology ==
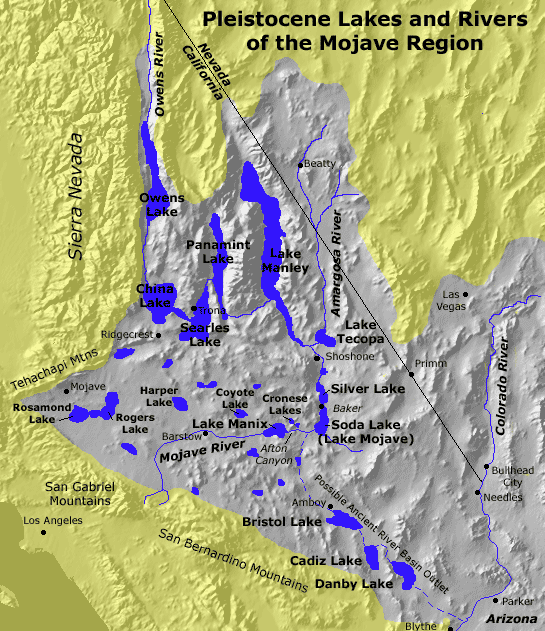
The Pleistocene lake system of the Mojave Desert

During the ice ages, a number of lakes filled in the Great Basin and the southwestern United States. These lake fillings were influenced by shifts in storm tracks caused by the Laurentide ice sheet. Changes in sea surface temperatures increasing moisture supply or increased supply from tropical regions may also have contributed to lake formation. Similar lakes included Lake Babicora, Lake Bonneville, Lake Estancia, Lake Lahontan, Lake Manly, Lake Owens, Lake Panamint, Lake Russell and Lake Searles. Some interglacials also featured the growth of lakes. Under present-day climate, runoff in the region is also influenced by the El Niño–Southern Oscillation, the Northern Annular Mode and the Pacific decadal oscillation; the Northern Annular Mode may have affected the infilling of Lake Manix as well.

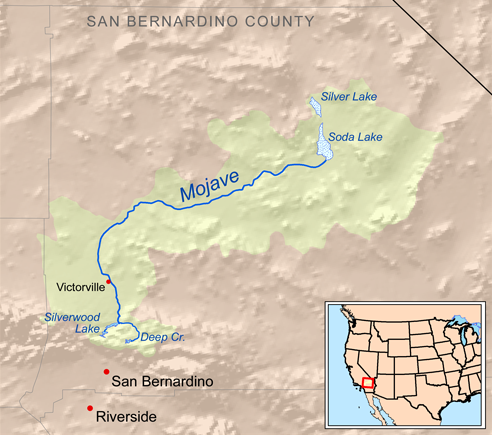
Course of the present-day Mojave River

The Mojave River drained into Lake Manix, with the formation of the lake reflecting increased precipitation in the San Bernardino Mountains. Local arroyos also drained into the lake. It has been estimated that runoff had to increase by a factor of about ten to form Lake Manix. Lake Manix contained over 1.6 cubic kilometres (0.38 cu mi) of water, possibly as much as 3.2 cubic kilometres (0.77 cu mi). Water levels in the lake frequently fluctuated by 5–15 metres (16–49 ft). It formerly was the Mojave River's terminal lake, and received about 1 millimetre per year (0.039 in/year) of sediment. The Coyote Basin was not permanently coupled to the main lake body; its relatively large surface area and consequently high evaporation would have stabilized lake levels when it was connected to Lake Manix proper.

Tufa, a type of calcium carbonate deposit that develops in waterbodies, formed within Lake Manix. Based on information gleaned from fossil ostracods, Lake Manix was a well mixed lake, especially in summer; likely, no thermocline (Note: The thermocline is a layer of water in a lake where temperatures decrease strongly with depth.) developed in it. While the lake may have been warm during oxygen isotope stage 12 and possibly nourished from early summer runoff, after that point it was much colder, with water temperatures not rising above 4 °C (39 °F). After oxygen isotope stage 5, the lake became warmer again. The environment of Lake Manix has been compared to shallow lakes in northern California that lie behind the Cascade Range.

Lake Manix was not the only lake that formed on the Mojave River; Lake Mojave in the Silver Lake and Soda Lake basins was also formed by the river. While it was at first believed that the two lakes could not have existed simultaneously, it has been suggested that Lake Mojave could have formed when Lake Manix still existed. Water spilled from Lake Manix to Lake Mojave; possibly, Lake Manix overflowed to that basin through Baxter Wash from a spillway south of the present-day Afton Canyon at an altitude of 544 metres (1,785 ft). While it is reasonable to assume, however, that earlier highstands were stabilized by overflow, there is no physical evidence in Baxter Wash for an overflow path there. Whatever path overflow might have taken, Lake Mojave was nourished by such overflow. The Mojave River, together with the Amargosa River, formed Lake Manly in Death Valley; the disappearance of Lake Manix after the formation of Afton Canyon would have increased water supply to Death Valley as evaporation surfaces were reduced. Another theory assumes that the Troy Lake basin of Lake Manix might have spilled into Bristol Lake and from there into the Colorado River; this theory is viewed as questionable seeing as there is no evidence that Bristol Lake (which Lake Manix waters would have flowed through on the way to the Colorado) contained an overflowing lake, although paleocurrent data obtained from Lake Manix deposits may support it.

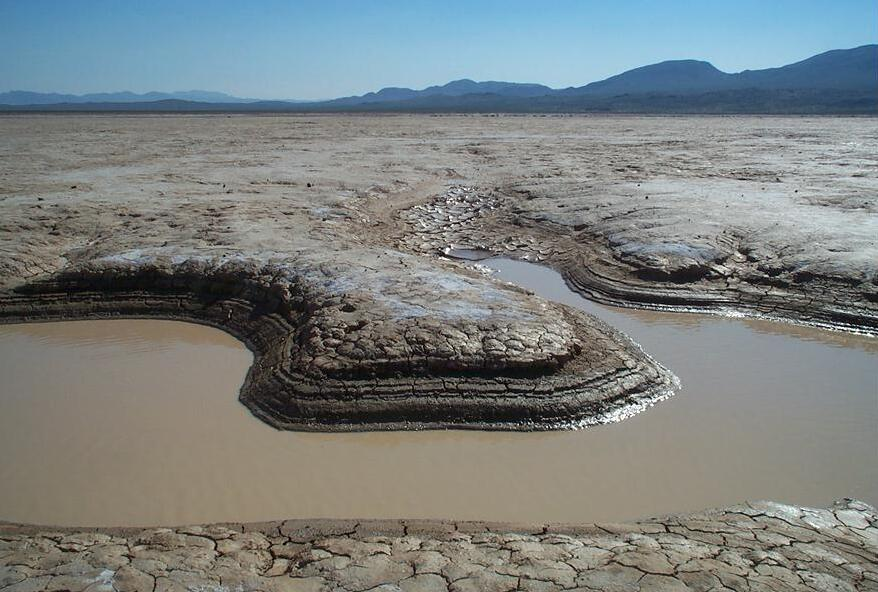
Present-day Coyote subbasin

Water levels in Lake Manix appear to have reached peaks during both cold and warm stages of the Dansgaard–Oeschger events, with a southward shift of storm activity and increased moisture supply triggering increased precipitation. The average storm track passes far north of the Mojave River headwaters, meaning that the river is exquisitely sensitive to changes in storm position.

== Biology ==
Bird species whose skeletons have been found in sediments of Lake Manix include the western grebe and the white pelican. Other bird skeletons found there have been attributed to the species Aquila chrysaetos (Golden eagle), Branta canadensis (Canada goose), Ciconia maltha (an extinct stork), Erismatura jamaicensis (Ruddy duck), the genus Grus, Nyroca valisineria, Nannopterum auritum (double-crested cormorant), Phoenicopterus copei and Phoenicopterus minutus. These are typical lake-dwelling birds that have also been found at Fossil Lake in Oregon, and might indicate that the lake was a stopover for bird migrations. Mammal genera at Lake Manix included Canis, Felis, Equus, Camelops, Tanupolama, Ovis, Bison, Mammuthus and Nothrotherium. This fauna list, called "Camp Cady local fauna" after a Union Army post in the area, is not exhaustive. The fossils of the Manix Formation have been studied for over a century.

The freshwater clam Anodonta californiensis existed in Lake Manix, as well as gastropods. Anodonta especially was probably very common in Lake Manix and other paleolakes, considering the large shell deposits left by it. Fish species whose fossils have been found include the Mojave tui chub and stickleback. The Western pond turtle also existed in the lake.

An abundance of Ostracod valves have been found in the Manix beds, including Limnocythere ceriotuberosa and other Limnocythere species. Subordinates include Candona species, Cypridopsis vidua, Heterocyphris incongruens, Limnocythere bradburyi, Limnocythere platyforma and Limnocythere robusta.

Diatoms found at Lake Manix include Stephanodiscus species. Further evidence of microbial organisms are present in the Stromatolites developed in the lake.

Lake Manix during the time of its existence featured reedy marshes surrounded by juniper and sage vegetation and Pinyon-juniper woodlands in the mountains. The present natural vegetation consists mostly of the creosote bush; starting in 1964, parts of the lake bed were used for groundwater-supported center pivot irrigation-driven agriculture before increasing water-pumping costs after 1980 caused their abandonment.

== Climate ==
Present-day climates at the location of Lake Manix are dry and warm, with the mean temperature at Barstow 21.2 °C (70.2 °F). Precipitation is scarce, 125–150 millimetres per year (4.9–5.9 in/year), while potential evaporation exceeds 2,000 millimetres per year (79 in/year). In the Victorville area, winter is the season where most of the precipitation falls, while east of Barstow two wet seasons occur, one in winter and another in late summer.

== History ==
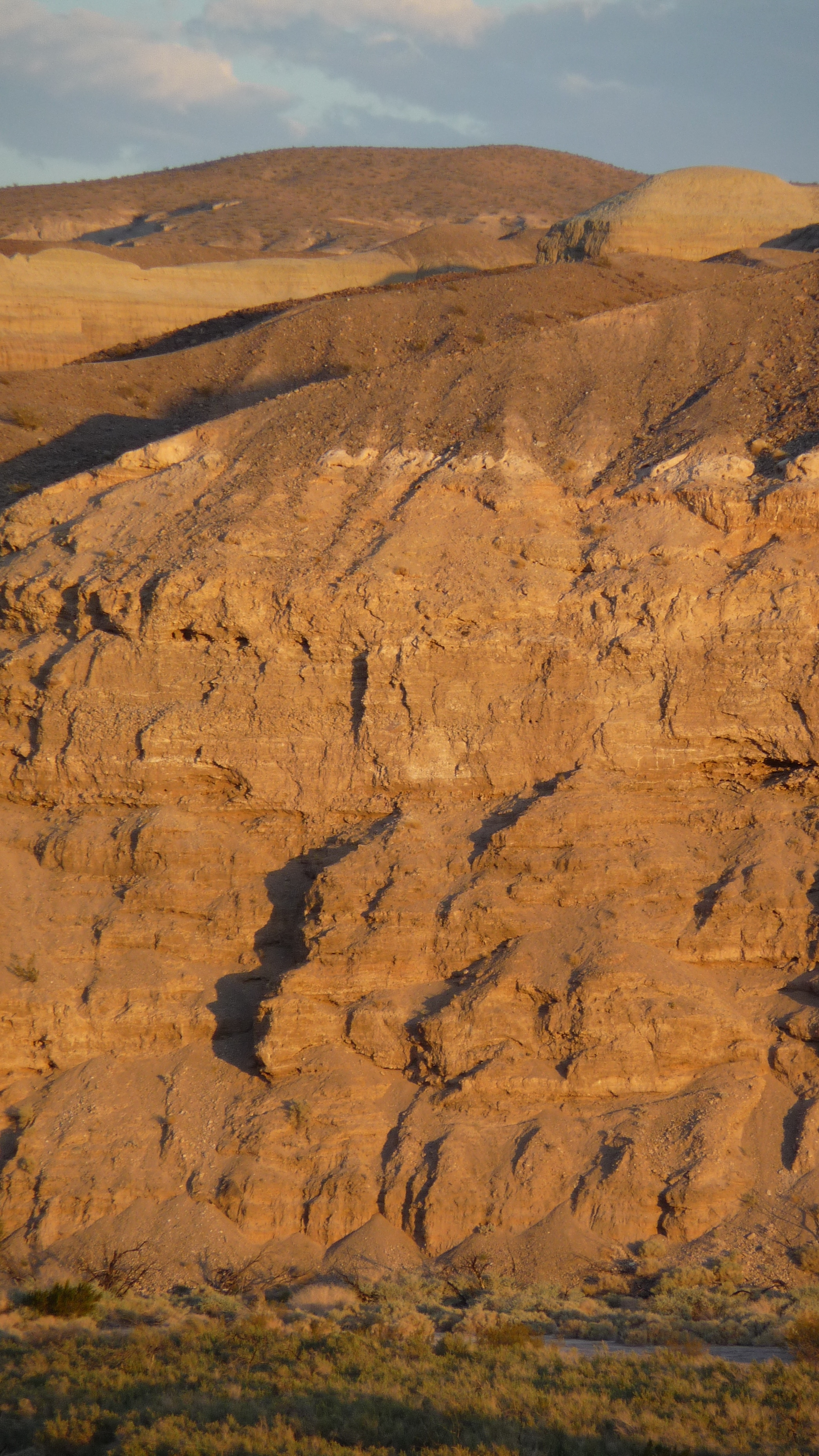
Shorelines of Lake Manix

Originally, the Mojave River flowed southward before tectonic changes forced its course into the Mojave Desert between 2 and 1.5 million years ago. At that point, the river ended at Victorville, and after 575,000–475,000 years ago, in Harper Lake. About 500,000 years ago, it reached the Cady Basin of Lake Manix, based on tephrochronological dating of the Bishop Tuff. At first, the river may have alternated between Harper Lake and Lake Manix. 190,000 years ago, Afton Basin was integrated with the other three basins, as the river cut through the Buwalda Ridge. The presence of deposits with chaotically bedded rocks suggests that the breakthrough took the form of a catastrophic flood that may have been a mudflow. Afton Basin had a bottom at an altitude of c. 460 metres (1,510 ft) before; as it was integrated into Lake Manix, sedimentation progressively filled it. The course change from Harper Lake to Lake Manix was not immediately stable; 25,000 years ago, the Mojave River was again filling both lakes before definitively shifting to Manix by 20,000 years before present.

Conflicting interpretations of the history of Lake Manix exist, particularly for the late Pleistocene. One theory assumes three distinct highstands during the Pleistocene; they have been dated 33,500–30,500, 23,500–20,800 and 17,600–16,500 years ago. An alternative timeline assumes three highstands at 40,000–35,000, 33,000–20,000 and 27,000–25,000 radiocarbon years. Clusters of shells in highstand deposits are dated 36,000–33,000 and 26,500–21,500 years before present. Other theories assume eight highstands and unstable lake levels between 45,000 and 25,000 years before present. Yet another theory assumes four highstands during oxygen isotope stages 6, 4 and 2. Finally, radiocarbon dating in 2015 yielded highstand ages of 43,000, 39,700, 36,100, 34,100, 31,600, 30,800, 29,400, 27,200 and 25,600 years ago, coinciding with cold and wet periods in speleothem records in Arizona and New Mexico.

The lake existed at least until 14,230 ± 1,325 years Before Present. Lake Manix drained when the Afton Canyon formed, possibly around 13,800 years before present; an earlier estimate of 14,000 years ago was later discarded. An alternative date is about 25,000 years before present. This emptying may have been quick, draining Lake Manix within a short time, perhaps as little as ten hours. The draining probably contributed to the "Lake Mojave II" highstand. After the initial catastrophic cutting, a slower incision further deepened the Afton Canyon. Alternative theories assume a much slower formation of the Afton Canyon outlet, based on the presence of several terraces and possible recessional landforms. As of 2003, the formation speed question was still not settled. The formation of the path to Afton Canyon was probably aided by the Manix Fault, which had left easily eroded sediments. The Mojave River may have drained into the Coyote Basin even after the formation of Afton Canyon under the influence of faulting until headward erosion cut off that basin from the river flow about 9,000–7,500 years ago. Sediments transported through Afton Canyon during the event and afterwards have buried the landscape beneath Afton Canyon, potentially also contributing sand to the development of the Kelso Dunes.

At present, almost all runoff of the Mojave River comes from the San Bernardino Mountains, and ground infiltration and water diversions mean the river ends in the Victorville area; only the biggest floods reach all the way to Soda Lake. Water occasionally also flows into the Cronese Lakes beneath the Afton Canyon.

== Archeology ==
Lake Manix may have been important for early humans in the area. Radiocarbon dating attests to the presence of humans at Lake Manix around 11,500 years before present.

Lithic artifacts have been found at the shorelines of Lake Manix. Some are of late Pleistocene age. Such artifacts include bifaces, disks, flakes and hammerstones, which were grouped as the "Lake Manix Industry". Their supposedly pre-Clovis origin was questioned for a number of reasons. Dates obtained on the desert varnish they were embedded in yielded ages of 400–32,000 years before present, indicating that these items have varying origins and cannot be considered part of one grouping.

== See also ==
- List of lakes in California
- Calico Early Man Site
