= Lake Mojave =

- Location within California Location within the United States
- Location: Mojave Desert, San Bernardino County, California
- Coordinates: 35.24113°N 116.08017°W
- Lake type: Glacial lake (former)
- Primary inflows: Mojave River
- Basin countries: United States
- Surface elevation: 288 m (945 ft)

Lake Mojave was an ancient former lake fed by the Mojave River that, through the Holocene, occupied the Silver Lake and Soda Lake basins in the Mojave Desert of San Bernardino County, California. Its outlet may have ultimately emptied into the Colorado River north of present-day Blythe.

== Geography ==
Lake Mojave existed in what is now San Bernardino County. The city of Las Vegas lies 140 kilometres (90 mi) northeast of the basin. Present-day locations on its shores are Zzyzx and Baker, California.

On the western side, Lake Mojave was bordered by mountains that steeply rise from the basin. The eastern side is more gentle, featuring alluvial fans and pediment. The basin was probably formed by fault activity.

=== The lake ===
At its maximum stand, Lake Mojave had a surface area of 300 square kilometres (120 sq mi) and a volume of 7 cubic kilometres (1.7 cu mi). Lake Mojave had two separate lake level stands, the A stand and the B stand. The A stand lies at an altitude of 287 metres (942 ft) above sea level and the B stand at an altitude of 285.4 metres (936 ft). The lake was about 10 metres (33 ft) deep.

Fifteen alluvial fans abut the shores of Lake Mojave that face the Soda Mountains. A present-day 40 kilometres (25 mi) bay exists on the northwestern side of the Silver Lake basin and includes wavecut terraces and a beach ridge.

Silver Lake and Soda Lake exist today where Lake Mojave formerly existed. Soda Lake slopes to the north and lies at a higher altitude than Silver Lake, thus water tends to fill Soda Lake first, overflowing to Silver Lake only during extreme floods. Beach ridges and shorelines testify to the existence of a past lake in the Silver Lake basin. One major beach ridge complex is named the El Capitan Beach Ridge complex and contains gravel and sand.

Sediments from Lake Mojave and its two successor basins may be part of the sources of sand for the Kelso Dunes. Dating of dune deposition suggests that the deposition events often correspond to times where water levels in Lake Mojave were less stable.

== Hydrology ==
=== Inflow ===
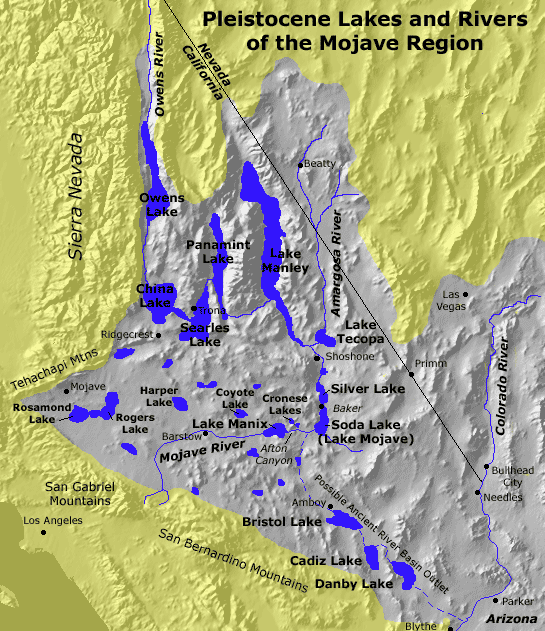
Lake Mojave in relation to other Pleistocene-era lakes in the region

The Mojave River is the principal river reaching the Lake Mojave basin, and the principal river of the Mojave Desert. Presently, a number of springs on the western side of the Lake Mojave basin form small waterbodies. The total watershed area is about 11,860 square kilometres (4,580 sq mi).

Most water of the Mojave River ultimately comes from the San Bernardino Mountains, 201 kilometres (125 mi) southwest, where precipitation reaches 840 millimetres (33 in) per year. Precipitation increased in response to southward shifts of the polar jet stream; this and floods probably contributed to the formation of Lake Mojave.

The Mojave River flows into the Mojave Desert since about 2–1.5 million years ago, when its previous southward course was blocked by the uplift of the Transverse Ranges. The Mojave River did not always end in Lake Mojave; at other points of its history it reached Lake Harper, Lake Manix, the Cronese Lakes and Lake Manly. Lake Mojave was reached about 20,000 years before present by water overflowing from Lake Manix. Compared to today, water flow would have to be at least ten times higher to allow for the formation of Lake Mojave.

=== Outflow ===
A bedrock-lined channel extends from a bay on the northern side of Silver Lake and forms the outlet of Lake Mojave. It is at times less than 3.0 metres (10 ft) wide. The channel terminates into Dry Lake playa, 4.8 kilometres (3 mi) away. This spillway stabilized the levels of Lake Mojave during the late Pleistocene, although erosion of the spillway caused a gradual decline in water levels.

It was once thought that overflow from Lake Mojave was nourishing a freshwater Lake Dumont, but later ostracod research indicated that that area was groundwater-supported wetland. Water from Lake Mojave eventually reached the Amargosa River and Death Valley.

In 1916-1917 the outlet channel was deepened in order to lower water levels. Before that, the floor of the channel had an elevation of 2,867 metres (9,407 ft).

== Climate ==
Present day climate in the area is hot and dry. On average, summer temperatures exceed 30 °C (86 °F) and are increasing with global warming. Decreases in temperature are not sufficient to create waterbodies; precipitation must increase too.

Average precipitation is about 78 millimetres per year (3.1 in/year). Most of it falls during winter and early spring, with about one quarter coming during summer from the Gulf of California and Gulf of Mexico. This low precipitation contrasts to a high evaporation rate of 2,000–2,500 millimetres per year (79–98 in/year). Precipitation varies from year to year and its future changes with global warming are unclear. However, the water budget of Lake Mojave was mostly controlled by coastal conditions, where the Mojave River originates.

== Biology ==
A number of shells of Anodonta californiensis have been found at Lake Mojave. Phacotus freshwater algae developed in early Holocene lake stages. Ostracods of Lake Mojave include Limnocythere bradburyi and Limnocythere ceriotuberosa. Crustaceans may have provided food sources.

Lake Mojave was surrounded by a mix of pinyon-juniper and Joshua tree woodlands down to altitudes of 330 metres (1,080 ft) and desert vegetation. At the time, numerous animal species lived around the lake, including bighorn sheep, black-tailed jackrabbit, coots, desert cottontail, desert mule deer, ducks, geese, Merriam's kangaroo rat, pocket mice, shellfish and tui chubs, which could provide food for early humans.

Present-day vegetation in the area includes creosote bush, saltbush and Opuntia. There is more vegetation in washes and on river terraces.

== Chronology ==
Lake Mojave existed between 22,000 and 9,000 years before present. It is one of several pluvial lakes in the Mojave Desert, including Lake Manix and Coyote Lake, Lake Harper and Lake Ivanpah. The history of the Silver Lake basin is better known than that of the Soda Lake area.

Based on the Wells chronology, the lake filled before 27,000 years before present and from then on fluctuated below the A-shoreline. The lake was stable at the A-shoreline 21,900 - 19,750 and 16,850 - 13,850 years before present. The early phase is also known as Lake Mojave I, while later phases are also known as Lake Mojave II. Alternative age ranges are 20,900 - 19,600 for Lake Mojave I and 16,500 - 13,400 for Lake Mojave II. More recent research indicates that water levels remained high between 20,500 and 12,800 years ago, with only a brief drop about 16,200 years ago. Water draining from Lake Manix after the formation of Afton Canyon may have aided in the development of Lake Mojave, although much of the water would have continued into Death Valley due to the insufficient volume of the Lake Mojave basin.

Between 13,600 and 11,500 years before present, the formation of a spillway caused Lake Mojave to abandon its A-shoreline and drop to the B-shoreline. Lake Mojave stabilized at the B-shoreline until 8,700 years, 9,700 years or, according to more recent theories, until 11,000 years ago, when the Mojave River no longer supplied enough water to sustain a waterbody. Wetlands supported by water lasted for several more millennia.

The disappearance of Lake Mojave was caused by climatic changes at the start of the Holocene. This contrasts with Lake Ivanpah, which (probably under monsoon influence) maintained itself during the Holocene. Some earlier fluctuations in water levels were caused by faulting in the Lake Manix basin, which occasionally diverted the Mojave River into the Coyote Lake Basin.

Wind erosion affected the beach and delta deposits left by Lake Mojave, forming aeolian sediments.

Presently, only rarely do lakes form in the basin of Lake Mojave. Individual occurrences occurred in 1916–1917, 1938-1939 and 1969; this latter lake stage was photographed and it submerged the Tonopah and Tidewater railroad. Other infillings occurred 3,910 ± 152 and 470 ± 160 years ago. Such resurgences of the lake depend on anomalously high precipitation on the San Bernardino Mountains, and are climatically linked to the Little Ice Age and other glacial expansion episodes. The existence of such lakes was not only limited by climate factors but also by a generally shallow lake basin that caused a strong increase in evaporation with only slight increases in water levels.

== Archaeology ==
A steady food and freshwater supply as well as the presence of rocks that could be used to manufacture tools drew early humans towards Lake Mojave. As lake levels dropped, people migrated progressively farther down to reach the lake.

Some presumably archaeological sites have been found at Lake Mojave, including alignments of basalt boulders. Bifaces and projectiles have been found on its shores, the latter are dated about 10,000 - 8,000 years before present, these archaeological findings are known as the "Lake Mojave" complex. Most archeological sites around Lake Mojave however date to after its drying, often associated with brief highstands.

The so-called "Lake Mojave complex" is a cultural system that was active between 9,000 and 6,000 BC. Possibly, such cultures were derived from the Clovis culture and formed when big mammals disappeared and early humans had to search for different sources of food.

== See also ==
- List of lakes in California
