= Limnocythere porphyretica =

Conservation status
- Vulnerable (IUCN 2.3)

Scientific classification
- Kingdom: Animalia
- Phylum: Arthropoda
- Class: Ostracoda
- Order: Podocopida
- Family: Limnocytheridae
- Genus: Limnocythere
- Species: L. porphyretica

Binomial name
- Limnocythere porphyretica De Deckker, 1981

Species of seed shrimp

Limnocythere porphyretica is a species of crustacean in family Limnocytheridae. It is endemic to Australia.
