= Limnocythere staplini =

Scientific classification
- Domain: Eukaryota
- Kingdom: Animalia
- Phylum: Arthropoda
- Class: Ostracoda
- Order: Podocopida
- Family: Limnocytheridae
- Genus: Limnocythere
- Species: L. staplini

Binomial name
- Limnocythere staplini Gutentag & Benson, 1963

Species of seed shrimp

Limnocythere staplini is a species of crustacean belonging to the family Limnocytheridae.

It is native to Northern America.
