= Limnocythere inopinata =

Scientific classification
- Domain: Eukaryota
- Kingdom: Animalia
- Phylum: Arthropoda
- Class: Ostracoda
- Order: Podocopida
- Family: Limnocytheridae
- Genus: Limnocythere
- Species: L. inopinata

Binomial name
- Limnocythere inopinata (Baird, 1843)

Species of seed shrimp

Limnocythere inopinata is a species of crustacean belonging to the family Limnocytheridae.

It has cosmopolitan distribution.
