= Leucocythere =

Scientific classification
- Kingdom: Animalia
- Phylum: Arthropoda
- Clade: Pancrustacea
- Class: Ostracoda
- Order: Podocopida
- Family: Limnocytheridae
- Genus: Leucocythere; Kaufmann, 1892

Type species
- Leucocythere mirabilis Kaufmann, 1892

Genus of seed shrimps

Leucocythere is a genus of ostracods in family Limnocytheridae. It contains at least the following species:

- Leucocythere algeriensis Martens, 1989
- Leucocythere helenae Martens, 1991
- Leucocythere mirabilis Kaufmann, 1892
