= Lake Estancia =

Prehistoric lake in New Mexico, United States

- Location of Lake Estancia in New Mexico

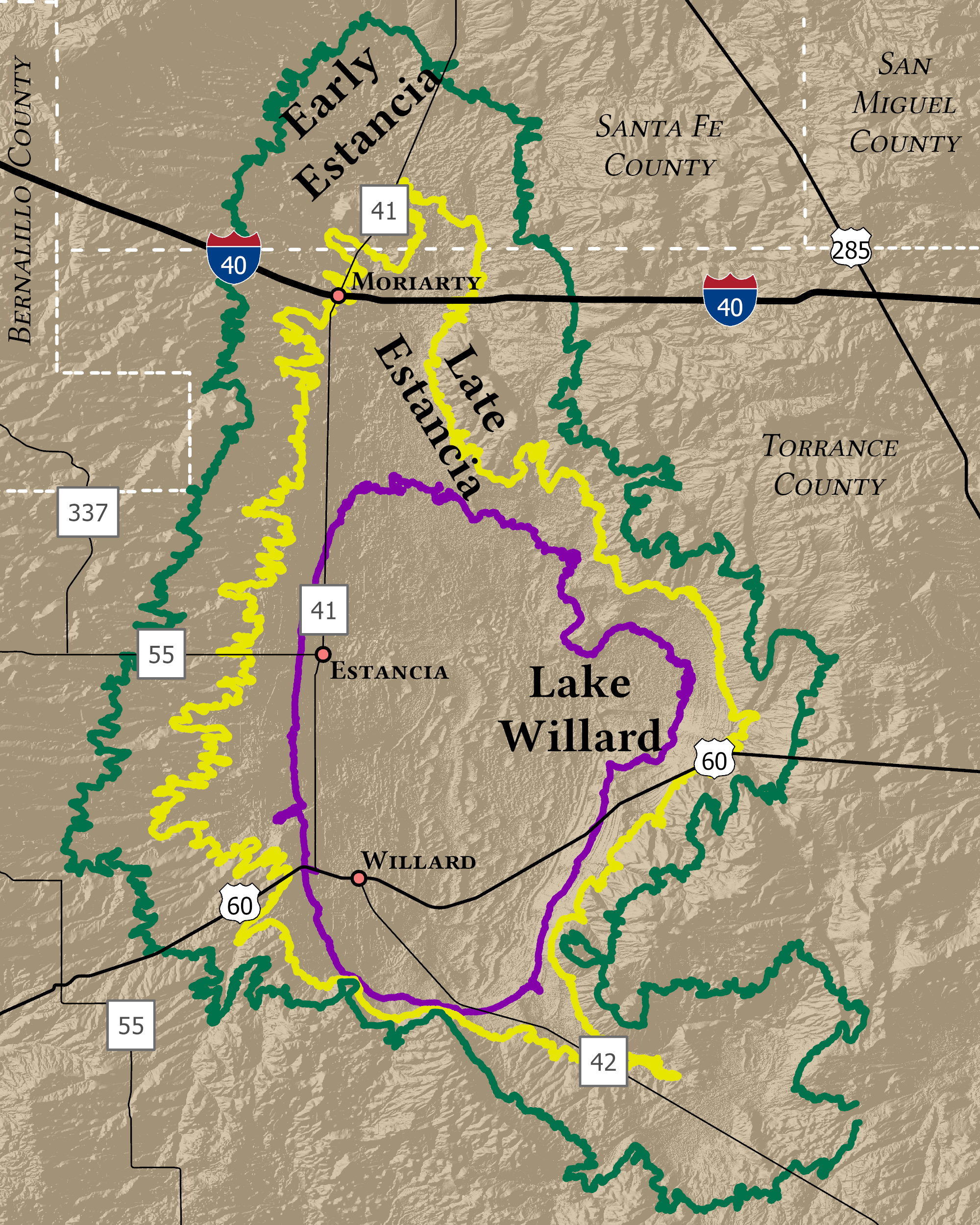
- A map of the position of the former shorelines of Lake Estancia
- Location: Estancia Valley, New Mexico, US
- Coordinates: 35°N 106°W
- Type: former lake
- Max. length: 56 kilometres (35 miles)
- Max. width: 37 kilometres (23 miles)

Lake Estancia was a lake formed in the Estancia Valley, now in central New Mexico, United States. The lake, which left various coastal landforms in the valley, was mostly fed by creek and groundwater from the Manzano Mountains, and fluctuated between freshwater stages and saltier stages. The lake had a diverse fauna, including cutthroat trout; they may have reached it during a possible past stage where it was overflowing.

Lake Estancia appears to have formed between the Pliocene (Note: The period of time between 5.333 and 2.58 million years ago.) and Pleistocene, (Note: The period of time between 2.58 and 0.0117 million years ago.) when a previous river system broke up. It reached a maximum water level ("highstand") presumably during the Illinoian glaciation and subsequently fluctuated between fuller stages and a desiccated basin. Around the Last Glacial Maximum (LGM) time interval, several highstands and a low water level state occurred during the "Big Dry" climate interval. Between 16,100 and 14,500 years ago the lake reached its highest stand of the last 30,000 years before drying up again during the Bølling-Allerød climate interval. The lake briefly returned during the Younger Dryas climate interval and eventually desiccated during the Holocene, after about 8,500 years ago. (Note: The time period between 11,700 years ago and today.) Wind-driven erosion has excavated depressions in the former lakebed that are in part filled with playas (dry lake beds).

The lake was one of several pluvial lakes (Note: Pluvial lakes are former lakes that developed during the ice ages and are now dry.) in southwestern North America that developed during the late Pleistocene. Their formation has been variously attributed to decreased temperatures during the ice age and increased precipitation; a shutdown of the thermohaline circulation and the Laurentide Ice Sheet altered atmospheric circulation patterns and increased precipitation in the region. The lake has yielded a good paleoclimatic record.

== History and climatological implications ==
The Estancia Valley became a closed basin (Note: A closed basin is a drainage system that ends in a lake or depression, with evaporation being the only means through which water leaves the system.) at some point during the Pliocene to middle Pleistocene. Previously, the Estancia Valley was occupied by a river that flowed through the Encino Basin into the Pecos River and eventually into the Brazos River. Fault movement was probably responsible for the breakup of this drainage system. Dissolution of the Yeso Formation from the Permian period may have contributed to the subsidence of the basin.

The low thickness of lake sediments in the Estancia Valley suggests that the lake began to form only in the middle Pleistocene. Early Lake Estancia, most likely larger than the LGM lake, existed possibly during the Illinoian glaciation and largely dried up in the warm and dry climate of the Sangamonian interglacial. Climate changes recorded in the cave deposits in the Cavenee Caverns northwest of the Lake Estancia basin have been correlated to fluctuations of Lake Estancia; they suggest that Lake Estancia may have desiccated 134,000–121,000 years ago. Between 69,000 and 19,000 years ago, water levels were higher 41,000–38,000 years ago and lower 57,000–51,000 and 45,000–43,000 years ago, consistent with climate patterns recorded in regional cave deposits. The low water level stages correlate to the timing of maximum summer insolation and warm periods in Greenland; however, problems with dating these fluctuations make any inference about correlations to events elsewhere in North America problematic.

=== Last Glacial Maximum and later ===
The lake sediment record indicates that shallow lakes re-formed between 45,000 and 40,000 years ago. Water levels began to rise 24,000 years ago, and at least five highstands occurred during the LGM, with two more before and after the LGM. At least ten separate oscillations in water levels took place. Radiocarbon dating has yielded ages of 24,300 years ago for the first freshwater stage and 20,040 for the gap between the second and third freshwater stage. The expansion of lakes during the LGM was triggered by the growth of the Laurentide Ice Sheet, which forced the jet stream southward. A highstand around 23,000 years ago appears to coincide with Heinrich event 2, an episode in the North Atlantic where ice discharge into the ocean was increased and impeded heat transport by ocean currents.

The highstands lasted until 18,100–17,000 years ago when water levels declined, an event christened the "Big Dry" in the Lake Estancia basin. This dry interval separates the LGM highstand from the following highstands, and correlates to an episode of strong East Asian Monsoons. Evidence of the "Big Dry" has also been identified in South America, where the drying of paleolake Sajsi in the Altiplano of Bolivia may correlate to the Lake Estancia event, but not elsewhere in the Great Basin. It appears that during the "Big Dry" climate patterns in New Mexico decoupled from climate variations elsewhere on the world. Both its beginning and its end have been correlated to ice-rafting events in the North Atlantic but it is not clear how ice-rafting events could simultaneously trigger the beginning and the end of a dry episode. Possibly, the southward migration of the Intertropical Convergence Zone during the "Big Dry" cooled the northeastern Pacific, inducing drought despite the occurrence of a more winter-like atmospheric circulation over North America, which would be expected to increase precipitation. Later research has proposed that the end of the "Big Dry" may relate to the ice-rafting events, given chronological uncertainties.

Another highstand took place after the "Big Dry" during the late phase of the so-called Mystery Interval, when Antarctica and the European Alps were already warming despite the cooling that occurred at the time of Heinrich event 1. This highstand was the largest highstand of the last 30,000 years not only of Lake Estancia, but also in other Great Basin lakes. It appears that the end of the "Big Dry" and the transition to the Mystery Interval highstand correlates to a southward movement of the thermal equator and an abrupt weakening of the East Asian Monsoon. These events could have been triggered by an extended shutdown of the thermohaline circulation, which caused Arctic sea ice to expand and Antarctic sea ice to contract, causing a southward migration of the Intertropical Convergence Zone. The forcing by the Laurentide Ice Sheet was important for the Mystery Interval lake level changes as well. The highstand between 16,100 and 14,500 years ago has been christened the "Big Wet".

There were two more highstands 14,000–12,500 years ago, followed by desiccation 12,000 or 14,000 years ago when the lake declined over the course of a millennium. This decline of water levels was a consequence of a drier climate in the Southwestern United States, the so-called "Clovis-age drought", and relates to the Bølling-Allerød period, a time period where climate changed. The exposed lake bed was eroded by wind, producing dunes. "Lake Willard", the final highstand at about 1,860 meters (6,100 feet) elevation, has been linked to the Younger Dryas when a moister climate returned to the Southwestern United States. It took place 11,000–10,000 years ago and was short lived. Ridges on the eastern side of the Estancia Valley formed during this highstand.

Similarities have been noted between the record of Lake Estancia and that of Lake Cochise in Arizona, Lake Mojave in California and San Luis Lake in Colorado. The timing of Lake Estancia highstands is coherent with the timing of highstands in other Great Basin lakes. Water levels at other Great Basin lakes too declined with the Bølling-Allerød period and concomitant abrupt global climate change. Conversely, the water level changes at Lake Estancia are opposite to lake-level fluctuations at low latitudes. Lake level rises probably took only a few decades. Fluctuations in water levels occurred secondarily to changes in the atmospheric moisture transport.

=== Short term changes ===
Millennial-scale oscillations are documented from lake deposits, which have been explained by streamflow pulses lasting several decades and separated by several centuries. These pulses were intense enough to increase inflow but not so long-lasting to raise water levels to overflow. Some lake level changes may have been too short to leave detectable shoreline deposits. Gypsum concentrations show strong 600 years long and weaker 350 and 250 years long cycles. The slow changes in the continental ice sheets cannot explain short-term changes in the lake, and other causal mechanisms have been sought. Solar cycles such as the Gleissberg solar cycle have been proposed as explanation for these fluctuations.

=== Holocene ===
Beach terraces and other beach deposits were emplaced early in the Holocene; after about 8,500 years before present Lake Estancia dried up. La Niña conditions during the Holocene reduced water inflow into the lake, which owing to high evaporation rates could not be compensated by summer precipitation. After Lake Estancia dried up, two separate wind deflation events took place, the first dated to either 4,000 or 7,000 years ago and the second to either 4,000 or 2,000 years ago. The deflation removed Quaternary sediments thus exposing their internal structure. The deflation also generated the playa basins and the "Willard soil" during the Altithermal climate phase. Dunes developed during hot and dry conditions of the middle Holocene. After the middle Holocene the climate became wetter again, reducing dune activity. The existence of a "Lake Meinzer" with a depth of 20 meters (66 feet) and an area of 520 square kilometres (200 square miles) after the Altithermal has been inferred. Presently, dry lakes occur on the bed of Lake Estancia and are fed by groundwater.

== Geography and geomorphology ==
Lake Estancia developed within the Estancia Valley, a closed basin in central New Mexico's Torrance County. The settlements of Estancia, Moriarty and Willard lie within the valley, which is about 70 kilometres (43 miles) southeast of Albuquerque. Interstate 40 crosses the northernmost parts of the lakebed of Lake Estancia, and New Mexico State Road 41 and U.S. Route 60 pass over the western and southern lakebed, respectively; formerly the tracks of the New Mexico Central Railroad and the Atchison, Topeka and Santa Fe Railway also traversed the lake bed. The lowest units of the Salinas Pueblo Missions National Monument are located close to the shorelines of former Lake Estancia.

Estancia Valley covers an area of 5,000 square kilometres (1,900 square miles) and is flanked to the east by the Pedernal Hills, to the northwest by the Sandia Mountains, to the west by the Manzano Mountains, to the south by the Juames Mesa and Chupadera Mesa and to the southeast by the Rattlesnake Hills. The Estancia Basin is near the Rio Grande-Pecos River drainage divide.

The central points of the valley contain over sixty playas, which formed within blowouts; the largest is Laguna del Perro and others include Laguna Chica and Laguna Salina. They hold water only briefly and are not remnants of Lake Estancia. The lowermost point of the valley lies at 1,850 meters (6,070 feet) elevation.

=== The lake ===
At its greatest extent, the lake was about 56 kilometres (35 miles) by 37 kilometres (23 miles) wide and covered the present-day locations of Estancia, McIntosh, Progresso and Willard. The lake may have resembled Lake Tahoe in California, although Lake Tahoe is deeper. Lake Estancia was the easternmost pluvial lake in Southwestern North America.

Distinct shoreline landforms in the Estancia Valley occur at various elevations, including bars, beaches, gravel deposits, ridges, scarps, spits, swales, terraces and wave-cut cliffs. A spit protruded northward into a bay on Lake Estancia's eastern shore. On the eastern side of Lake Estancia is a gypsum ridge about 3 meters (9.8 feet) high and 20 kilometres (12 miles) long, and smaller ridges are found elsewhere. These features are subdivided into an "older", less well developed shoreline at higher elevations and a "younger", better developed shoreline at lower elevations. Most shoreline deposits were formed by the accumulation of material; only in a few places did the lake actively erode pre-existing terrain.

Water levels may have reached 1,939 meters (6,362 feet) above sea level during the early Lake Estancia stage, 1,897 meters (6,224 feet) during the late Lake Estancia stage and possibly 1,870 meters (6,140 feet) during the "Lake Willard" stage, a late highstand. At maximum elevation the lake would have covered 2,340 square kilometres (900 square miles) and been 125 meters (410 feet) deep, while the Wisconsin-age lake was only 50 meters (160 feet) deep with an area of 1,170 square kilometres (450 square miles) and "Lake Willard" may have reached 20 meters (66 feet) depth and 610 square kilometres (240 square miles) surface area, although the estimated elevation is uncertain. During low water level stages shallow water or marshes covered the floor of Lake Estancia. Beach ridges from a last filling of the lake are found at the eastern edge of the lake floor.

Channels of streams reach the higher shorelines and less recognizable channels continue to lower shorelines. Some streams formed estuaries in Lake Estancia and/or were blocked off by partial or complete beach bars. On the western side of the lake, at Manzano Draw and Buffalo Draw there are deposits of deltas; Manzano Draw generated a fan delta on one of the lower shorelines. Another channel entering Lake Estancia was Torreon Creek. Debris was transported from the Manzano Mountains into the lake during highstands.

=== Lake deposits and post-lake dunes ===
The lake deposited flint-gray clay and gypsum during its high water level stages. Deposits from lake level rises have been classified as a geological formation, the Dog Lake Formation. During low water level stages, sulfate-rich groundwater formed gypsum, which together with silt constitutes the low-stand deposits. During low water level stages playa deposits and flood sediments accumulated in the dry lake bed, forming among other things the so-called "Estancia Playa Complex".

The Estancia Dune Field is a 120 square kilometres (46 square miles) dune field in Estancia Valley. It consists of gypsum dunes, a rare type of dunes. These dunes were generated when the lake dried up and gypsum was blown away by the wind. Wind-driven excavation of the dry lakebed has produced a scarp, lunette dunes, (Note: Lunette dunes are bow-shaped dunes that form downwind of dry lakes, when winds blow material from the dry lake bed and deposit it in these dunes.) dome-shaped landforms and crescent-shaped ridges.

=== Hydrology ===
The lake was fed by a centripetal pattern of streams and by groundwater, with highstands being fed mainly by streams and low water level stages by groundwater. The Manzano Mountains were its main water source but there were no glaciers in its watershed. The total watershed of Lake Estancia had an area of about 5,050 square kilometres (1,950 square miles), about 22% of which were occupied by the lake during the late Wisconsin glaciation. This is a large proportion of the watershed, a consequence of the high elevation of Lake Estancia which resulted in lower temperatures and thus slower evaporation than lakes at lower elevation. The water ultimately originated from the Pacific Ocean and westerly winds transported it to Lake Estancia. Groundwater discharge buffered the lake against climatic variations.

Leakage of groundwater out of the lake may have become significant at high water levels, thus stabilizing various highstands at a similar elevation around 1,890 metres (6,200 feet) when the amount of groundwater leaking out matched that of inflowing water. In particular, water may have leaked along groundwater pathways and the Chupadera Fault southwards into the Tularosa Basin during the Wisconsin glaciation, stabilizing Lake Estancia's water levels at about 1,900 metres (6,200 feet) despite the progressive infilling of the lake basin.

The lake was at times hypersaline and at times freshwater. This was confirmed by foraminifera data that disproved an earlier hypothesis that the lake was never freshwater. During the Wisconsin glaciation, lake waters were oligotrophic and reached temperatures of 10 degrees Celsius (50 degrees Fahrenheit). Strong winds and the shallow depth of the lake prevented its waters from becoming stratified and it has been inferred that Lake Estancia featured bottom currents. Silty water might have reached large distances from the shoreline, depositing its silt far into Lake Estancia. The gypsum in the lake deposits may have formed on the shoreline and was transported into Lake Estancia by winds.

=== Overflow ===
A broad saddle at 1,932 meters (6,339 feet) elevation separates the Estancia basin from the Pinos Wells basin to the south. Initial research did not encounter shoreline landforms at the elevation of this sill and thus concluded that no overflow took place, but in the mid-20th century traces of a former shoreline were found above the sill elevation. Further late-20th century research did not find evidence of shorelines at overflow elevation or of flow at the supposed sill. The lake probably did not overflow during the Wisconsin glaciation; if there was overflow it took place over 130,000 years ago.

If Lake Estancia overflowed under maximum highstands, it would have spilled into the Pinos Wells and Encino Basins southeast of the Estancia Valley, forming a lake with the maximum elevation of 1,911 meters (6,270 feet) in the two basins. The maximum height would have been set either at the northern margin of the Encino Basin by a sill to the Pintado Canyon or by a saddle east of Encino, New Mexico at Vaughn, New Mexico. In the first case, the overflow would have reached the Pecos River via Pintada Creek; in the second case it would have eventually disappeared underground into karstic terrain. Together, the Pinos Wells, Encino and Estancia lakes would have covered an area of 2,860 square kilometres (1,100 square miles). During the Wisconsin glaciation when Lake Estancia did not overflow, each of these basins might have been occupied by separate closed lakes although evidence for the existence of such a lake in the Pinos Wells basin is scant. The sill limiting Lake Estancia's height was probably downcut if it ever carried water.

== Climate ==
Today, the mean temperature of the valley is about 10 degrees Celsius (50 degrees Fahrenheit). Precipitation is less than 300 millimetres per year (12 inches per year) and much less than the annual evaporation rate of 1,520 millimetres per year (60 inches per year). Thus, permanent lakes cannot exist in the Estancia Valley under present-day conditions. The climate is characterized by Pacific cyclones during winter and the North American Monsoon during summer, which deliver moisture coming from the Gulf of California, Gulf of Mexico and the Pacific Ocean. Precipitation occurs in comparable quantities both in summer and winter but, given the high summer evaporation rates, runoff and groundwater recharge occurs mainly during winter.

Precipitation and vegetation were different in New Mexico during the ice ages, when Lake Estancia existed. From numerous proxy data (vegetation changes, rodent middens and glacier changes) it appears that during the Last Glacial Maximum (LGM) summers were colder than today, with less or no cooling during winter. During the LGM, precipitation may have increased around and south of the latitude of Lake Estancia, while it decreased north of it. As temperatures decreased by 10 degrees Celsius change (18 degrees Fahrenheit change) the snowline of the Manzano Mountains decreased by 1,000–1,500 meters (3,300–4,900 feet) and river flow increased. An interplay between climatic patterns such as the North American Monsoon and the El Nino-Southern Oscillation, the effects of solar cycles and variations of the Laurentide Ice Sheet controlled the climate of the Southwestern United States during the Pleistocene and Holocene.

Lake Estancia is only one among several lakes in New Mexico that formed or expanded (Note: Generally, the area of such lakes is the function of the inflow/recharge of the lake basin minus any leakage divided through the evaporation rate.) during the ice ages. During the LGM, tropical lakes had shrunk but water levels in lakes of Southwestern North America and Northern Africa rose. Rising water levels in Southwestern North America – including Lake Estancia – have been variously attributed either to increased precipitation from storm track changes induced by continental glaciation or to decreased evaporation. The exact timing of the highstands of Lake Estancia – during the LGM or during a warmer wetter period after the LGM – has also been debated.

== Biota ==
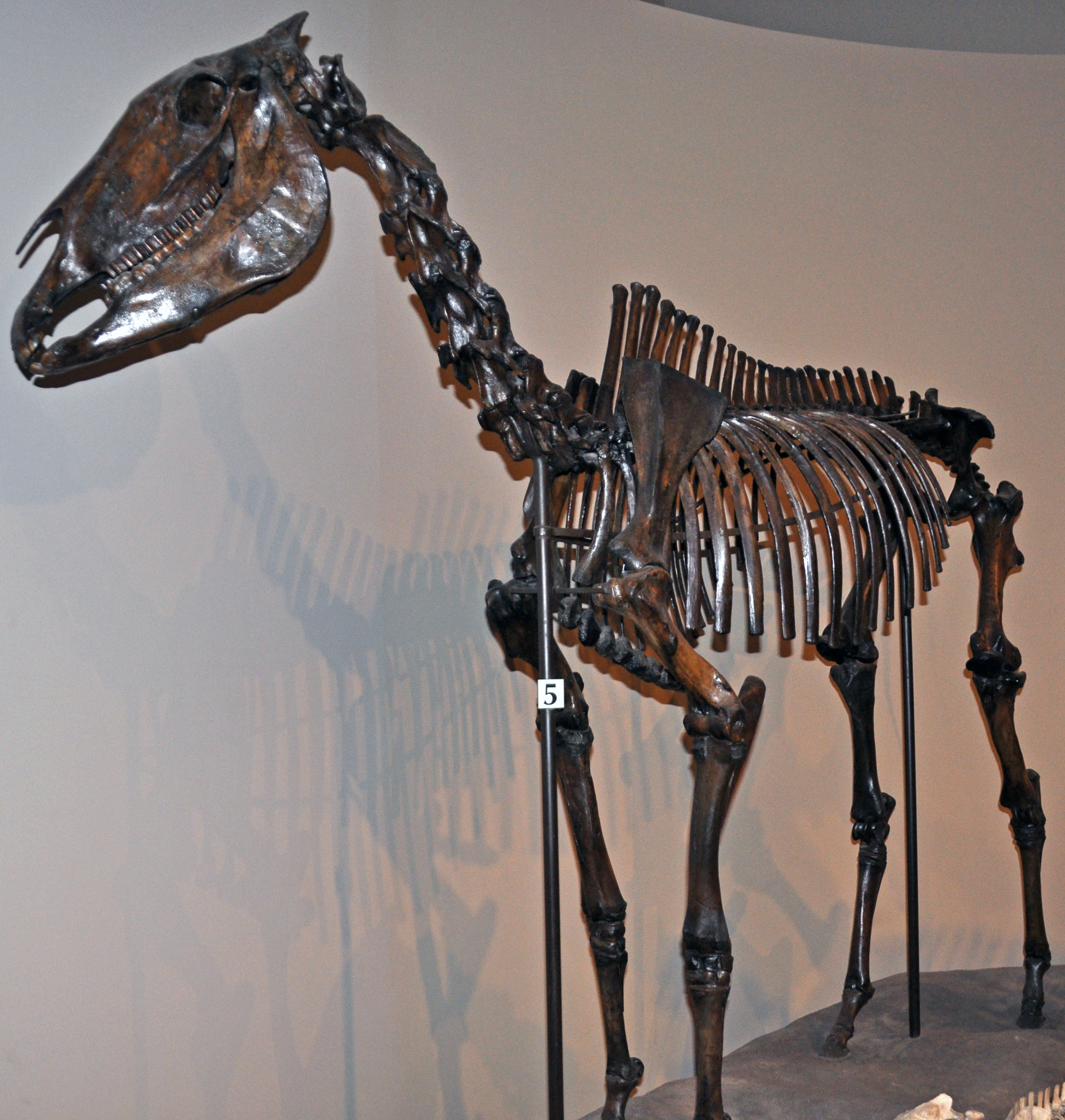
Equus occidentalis skeleton

The fossil animal fauna at Lake Estancia is represented by Rancholabrean (Note: The Rancholabrean is a stratigraphical unit based on a characteristic land mammal fauna which lived at the time of the human settlement of North America.) species. Fossils include ducks, the large horse Equus occidentalis and tiger salamander. There were mammoths at the lake, either after it dried up or during the "Lake Willard" stage. Based on pollen data, sagebrush grassland occurred around Lake Estancia, with pine-spruce woodland in the Manzano Mountains. Increased water availability probably allowed grazing animals to thrive around the lake.

Various fossils have been found in lake deposits, including algae, diatoms, foraminifera, gastropods, ostracods and pelecypods. During desiccation phases, mollusks disappeared and charophyte, the ditch grass Ruppia, and stonewort grew in the wet soils and saltwater. Vegetation around the lake may have consisted of open parkland.

Fossils of cutthroat trout have been found in deposits left by Lake Estancia; it appears to be the only fish species that lived in the lake. It probably was most closely related either to cutthroat trout from the Pecos River east of the Estancia Valley or to an extinct middle Pleistocene trout from the San Luis Valley in Colorado. The fish was present in the lake during its freshwater stages, when streams running from the Sandia and Manzano Mountains into Lake Estancia formed a favorable environment for spawning. Presumably, the trout entered Lake Estancia during its overflow phases and survived its low water level phases in the lake's tributaries but were eventually wiped out during Holocene drought; no present-day reports of fish in the Estancia basin are known. According to an alternative theory, the trout could have been living in former tributaries of the Estancia Valley that headed in the Sangre de Cristo Mountains; these tributaries would have been later captured by the Rio Grande and Pecos River.

== Anthropology and scientific importance ==
Humans first arrived in the Estancia Basin during a period where Lake Estancia was dry, before the rebound of water levels that took place during the Younger Dryas. The last lake cycles of Lake Estancia coincide with the Folsom period of human culture in North America. Unlike the lake itself which offered no useful resources, the surrounding region and shores were likely favorable environments for human settlement; numerous points (Note: Projectile points or points are the objects such as rocks that form the tip of an arrow. They are useful when reconstructing the cultural history.) including Folsom points (Note: Folsom points are a distinctive family of projectile points that were used by Paleoindians between 11,000 and 10,200 years ago.) have been found close to the former shores and on lake terraces. The "Lucy site" and the "Martin site" are archeological sites in the Estancia Valley; both are located in spots where water was available. Long after the lake dried up, Spaniards reported that Pueblo people traded with salt from the lake basin and there were disputes between the Church and State in the 1660s about its exploitation.

=== Research history and scientific significance ===
Evidence of the existence of former lakes in the Estancia Valley was first reported in 1903. Drill cores in lake sediments, landforms formed on the former shoreline and outcrops have yielded evidence of the basin's history, going back to the Illinoian glaciation. The paleoclimatic record of Lake Estancia is the best-studied in New Mexico, although different conclusions about precipitation and temperature during the ice age have been drawn from it. Compared to climatic records elsewhere in the Great Basin, the paleoclimate record of Lake Estancia is remarkably well preserved and has been used to infer general climate trends in the region as its large size allowed Lake Estancia to respond to regional climate changes. It also has a higher resolution and greater length than many other paleoclimate records. In contrast, little archeological research has focused on the lake's effects on human populations.

Older research published in 1989 indicates that during the early and middle Wisconsin glaciation, there was no freshwater lake in the Estancia Valley. Rather, saline and swampy environments were recorded from drill cores. Lake Estancia would have formed during the late Wisconsin as a saline lake and would have gone through three separate freshwater stages which would be part of the late Lake Estancia superstage. This third freshwater stage would have been the longest-lasting, followed by another freshwater stage, the "Lake Willard" stage, after a period of more saline conditions. The "Lake Willard" stage has yielded a date of 12,460 years; prior to this dating effort "Lake Willard" was considered to be about 8,000 years old and thus of Holocene age.
