= Leucocythere helenae =

Conservation status
- Vulnerable (IUCN 2.3)

Scientific classification
- Kingdom: Animalia
- Phylum: Arthropoda
- Class: Ostracoda
- Order: Podocopida
- Family: Limnocytheridae
- Genus: Leucocythere
- Species: L. helenae

Binomial name
- Leucocythere helenae Martens, 1991

Species of seed shrimp

Leucocythere helenae is a species of crustacean in the family Limnocytheridae. It is endemic to South Africa.
