= Neopluvial =

Moist period in western North America during the mid-to-late Holocene

The Neopluvial was a phase of wetter and colder climate that occurred during the late Holocene in the Western United States. During the Neopluvial, water levels in a number of now-dry lakes and closed lakes such as the Great Salt Lake rose and vegetation changed in response to increased precipitation. The event was not exactly synchronous everywhere, with neopluvial lake-level rises occurring between 6,000 and 2,000 years ago. It is correlative to the Neoglacial period.

== Evidence ==
The neopluvial took place in the western United States during the late Holocene, causing the levels of lakes in the Great Basin to increase and previously dry lakes and springs to refill. It has been observed in Great Salt Lake, Fallen Leaf Lake, Lake Cochise, the Mojave Desert, Mono Lake, Owens Lake, Pyramid Lake, San Luis Lake, Silver Lake, Summer Lake, Tulare Lake, Walker Lake and Winnemucca Lake.

During the Neopluvial, the Great Salt Lake became fresher, and Pyramid Lake reached a water level of 1,186 metres (3,891 ft) above sea level. Walker Lake, Owens Lake and Mono Lake experienced their highest Holocene water levels, with the volumes of the latter two lakes more than doubling. Likewise, water levels in Lake Tahoe rose to the point of overflowing into the Truckee River. Silver Lake in the Mojave Desert formed a perennial lake and vegetation was more widespread in the Little Granite Mountains. Summer Lake rose above its present-day level to an elevation of c. 1,278 metres (4,193 ft), although it was not as high as during the mid-Holocene. Water levels rose in Tulare Lake as well.

In the White Mountains, meadows formed during the Neopluvial. Ice patches in the Beartooth Mountains and glaciers grew in the Sierra Nevada, sagebrush steppe, green Mormon tea and other vegetation expanded in the Great Salt Lake region, marshes expanded in the central and northern Great Basin, mammal communities in the Lake Bonneville basin changed with the return of the long-tailed pocket mouse, the Great Basin pocket mouse and the Western harvest mouse to sites where they were not present before and increased abundances of even-toed ungulates, and tree lines dropped, with the lower limit of wooden vegetation penetrating into deserts. Counterintuitively, higher tree line elevations in the Lake Bonneville area occurred during the Neopluvial, which may indicate warmer summers. The end of the neopluvial may align with a change of speckled dace populations.

In the Owens Valley region, during the Neopluvial the human population became more sedentary and trans-Sierra Nevada trade became established ("Newberry"/"Middle Archaic Period"). Population around Lake Alvord increased during this time and lasted even after the Neopluvial had ended there. In Nevada, the largest indigenous houses were built during the neopluvial.

== Chronology ==
The beginning of the Neopluvial occurred about 6,000 years before present, but did not occur everywhere at the same time:

- The Neopluvial occurred between 4,000 and 2,000 years before present in the Carson Sink. The Neopluvial in the Lake Lahontan basin ended about 2,000 years ago.
- In Fallen Leaf Lake, the Neopluvial occurred 3,700 years before present in Fallen Leaf Lake. The end occurred 3,650 years before present; after that point precipitation became more irregular until the onset of the Little Ice Age about 3,000 years later.
- Its occurrence is dated between 5,100 and 2,650 years before present in the central-northern Great Basin,
- In the Great Salt Lake, the Neopluvial commenced 5,000 years before present and water levels reached their maximum between 3,000 and 2,000 years before present.
- It took place between 3,000 and 4,000 years before present in Lake Cochise.
- It occurred between 4,000 and 2,500 years before present in the Mojave Desert.
- In Pyramid Lake, the Neopluvial commenced starting from 5,000 years before present and reached a maximum between 4,100 and 3,800 years before present in Pyramid Lake.
- High elevation lakes in the Rocky Mountains with small watersheds, particularly sensitive to a changing water balance, showed synchronous increase in lake levels from 6,000 to 5,000 years before present, centered at 5,700 years ago.
- In the Summer Lake area, the Neopluvial is dated to have occurred between 4,000 and 1,900 years ago.
- Rising water levels in Lake Tahoe drowned trees between 4,800 and 5,700 years before present.
- In Tulare Lake, the Neopluvial lasted between 4,500 and 2,800 years before present; after that a severe drought occurred.

== Related events ==
The Neopluvial is in part correlative to the Neoglacial, and might have been caused by a change in winter conditions over the North Pacific. This cooling is primarily explained by steadily declining summer insolation, though synchronous patterns in hydrological responses at sub-millennial scales may be linked to atmospheric circulation shifts driven by factors such as internal variability in ocean-atmosphere teleconnections. Strengthening ENSO variability, a cooling of the North Pacific and a southward shift of the Pacific jet stream also coincided with the Neopluvial. The neopluvial resembles the Pluvial period that occurred in western North America during the late Last Glacial Maximum, but was much weaker than the LGM wet period.

== Terminology ==
The term "neopluvial" was coined in 1982 and originally referred to high lake levels in Summer Lake. The term has also been used for a mid-to-late Holocene phase of increased moisture noted in the form of increased wetness in eastern Texas, potentially linked to a stronger monsoon or to the neopluvial of the western US.
