= Harper Lake =

Dry lake in the state of California, United States

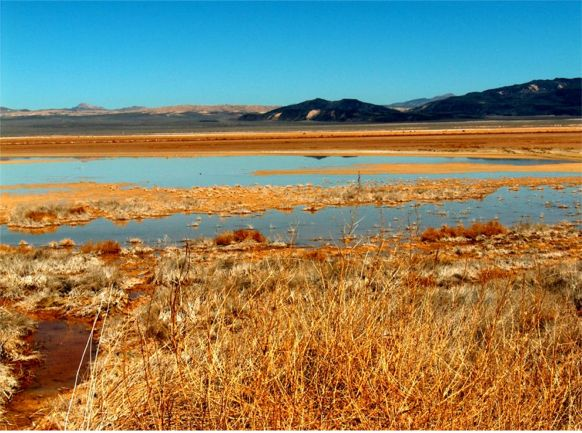
- Harper Dry Lake Marsh, diminished by years of agricultural diversion

- Location within California Location within the United States
- Location: Mojave Desert; San Bernardino County, California
- Coordinates: 35.0305°N 117.2900°W
- Lake type: Endorheic basin
- Basin countries: United States
- Max. length: 16 km (9.9 mi)
- Max. width: 7 km (4.3 mi)
- Shore length^{1}: 45 km (28 mi)
- Surface elevation: 617 m (2,024 ft)
- Settlements: Lockhart, California
- References: U.S. Geological Survey Geographic Names Information System: Harper Lake
- ^{1} Shore length is not a well-defined measure.

Harper Lake is a dry lake located in the Mojave Desert near the small community of Lockhart, California, in northwestern San Bernardino County of Southern California. The lake is accessible from Harper Lake Road, which runs north off of State Route 58 midway between Boron and Barstow.

== General ==
Lake Harper during its highstand reached an elevation of 658 metres (2,159 ft) above sea level, had a surface area of 255 square kilometres (98 sq mi) and was inhabited by cyprinid minnow, molluscs and ostracods. Ostracods found in Lake Harper are species of Candona, Cypridopsis, Heterocypris and Limnocythere. These species indicate a freshwater lake with seasonal inflow and some shallower environments. An elongated peninsula jutted into the lake from the western shore and smaller peninsulas existed on the northern and southern shores towards the eastern side of the lake. Blue clays in boreholes and fine grained mud and sand on the former shores testify to the existence of a lake there.

== History ==
The highest shorelines are dated to 24,400 ± 2,190 and 25,000 ± 310 radiocarbon years ago; further dates are 40,460 ± 550 and 33,830 ± 340 calibrated radiocarbon years ago. Lake Harper was the terminal lake for the Mojave River between 40,000 and 45,000 years before present, which is also considered to be the time of highstand of the lake; the river alternatively discharged into this lake and into Lake Manix farther downstream. The timespan where the Mojave River flowed into Harper Lake began 575,000 - 475,000 years ago when the river escaped the Victorville area and entered Harper Lake until 500,000 years ago when it started alternating between Lake Manix and Lake Harper. The last time that the Mojave River reached Lake Harper was between 25,000 and 20,000 years before present, but this finding was later considered to be doubtful.

Harper Lake contained water and a natural marsh into the early 20th century when agricultural development began to deplete the groundwater that sustained its level. The lake and marsh wetlands attracted large numbers of migrating birds and supported a variety of resident desert wildlife in the oasis habitat. Sustained by a small amount of surface runoff from nearby farms, only the southwest corner of the reduced lake remained marshland. Into the early 1990s, the wildlife was still supported by the remnant habitat.

Presently, Lake Harper forms a playa at an elevation of 615 metres (2,018 ft) above sea level. It features a dry climate with desert scrub vegetation surrounding the lake bed. Neogene alluvial fans form much of the surrounding and overlie older basalts.

=== Decline ===
The lake became dry and the marsh died in the late 1990s after the alfalfa farm next to the lake shut down and the migrating and resident wildlife dropped. When a new solar power plant was built just to the west of the lake, it needed to pump groundwater to the lake. However, this never occurred because the company that owned the plant went bankrupt. After the bankruptcy was resolved, the concerns of Edwards Air Force Base regarding bird strikes and other bureaucratic issues halted restoration progress.

=== Restoration ===
Meanwhile, Luz Solar Partners and NextEra Energy Resources, the new owners of the Solar Energy Generating Systems power plant, delivered water to the lake as requested by the Bureau of Land Management-BLM through an informal agreement. In 2005, a new petition was filed by Friends of Harper Lake with the BLM and California Energy Commission, which approved the amendments to the project. Up to 75 acre-feet (93,000 m^{3}) of water per year will be managed by the BLM and transferred to the lake as part of the mitigation agreement for solar field expansion.

== Other events ==
On March 25, 2009, an F-22 Raptor crashed on the lakebed, resulting in the death of a Lockheed Martin test pilot.

== See also ==
- Mojave Desert Animals
- List of birds of California
- List of lakes in California
- Solar power plants in the Mojave Desert
