= Neoglaciation =

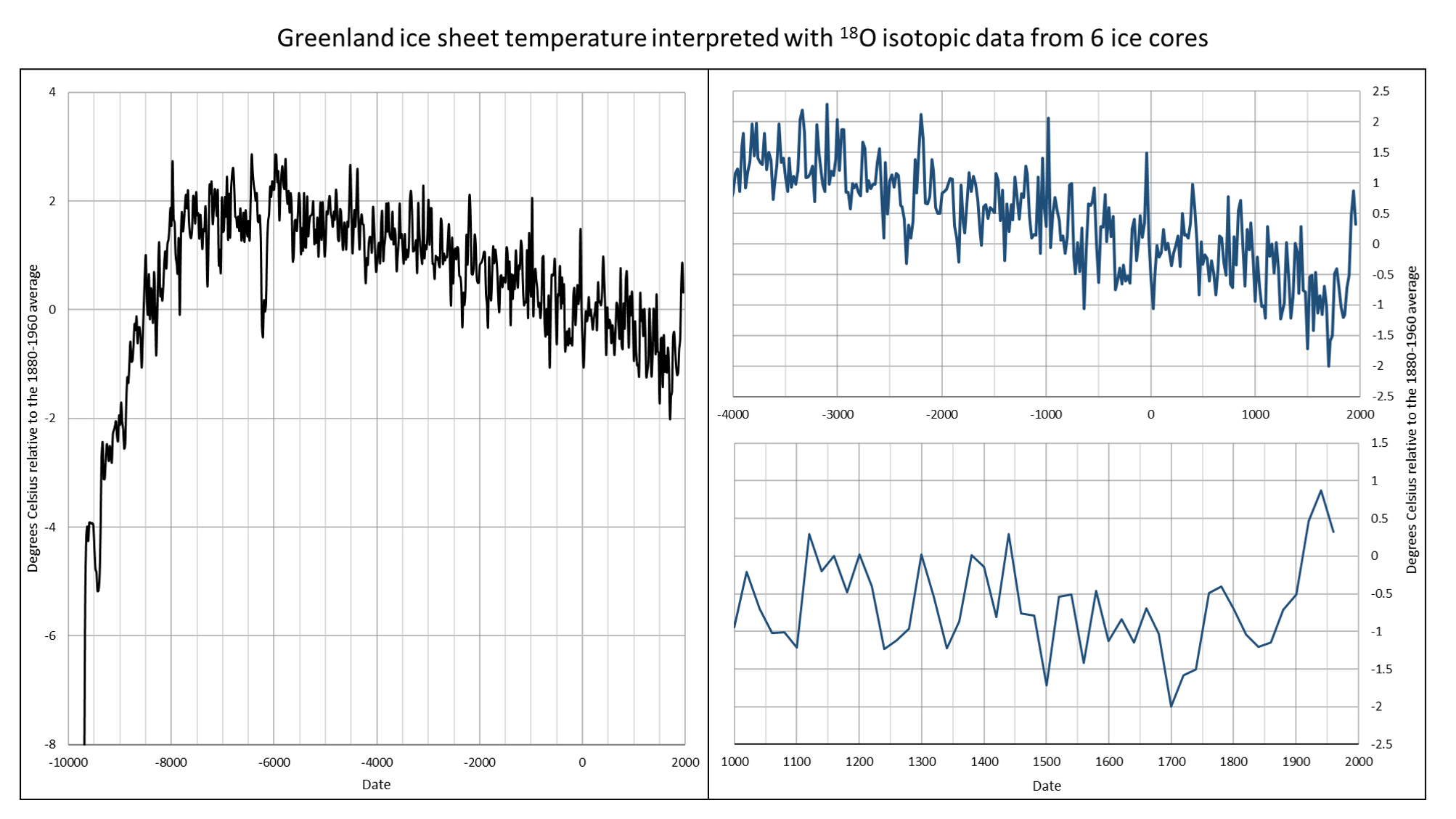
Greenland ice sheet temperatures interpreted with 18O isotope from 6 ice cores (Vinther, B., et al., 2009)

The neoglaciation ("renewed glaciation") describes the documented cooling trend in the Earth's climate during the Holocene, following the retreat of the Wisconsin glaciation, the most recent glacial period. Neoglaciation has followed the Hypsithermal or Holocene Climatic Optimum, the warmest point in the Earth's climate during the current interglacial stage, excluding the global warming-induced temperature increase starting in the 20th century. The neoglaciation has no well-marked universal beginning, in particular not in the Greenland Icecore temperatures: local conditions and ecological inertia affected the onset of detectably cooler (and wetter) conditions. It is, e.g., clearly visible in the Alpine tree border variation of the Kauner valley, both demonstrated together in the graph of H. J. Holm under Holocene.

Driven inexorably by the Milankovitch cycle, cooler summers in higher latitudes of North America, which would cease to melt the annual snowfall completely, were masked at first by the presence of the slowly disappearing continental ice sheets, which persisted long after the astronomically calculated moment of maximum summer warmth: "the neoglaciation can be said to have begun when the cooling caught up with the warming", remarked E. C. Pielou. With the close of the "Little Ice Age" (mid-14th to late 19th centuries), neoglaciation appears to have been reversed in the late 20th century, evidently caused by anthropogenic global warming. Neoglaciation had been marked by a retreat from the warm conditions of the Climatic Optimum and the advance or reformation of glaciers that had not existed since the last ice age. In the mountains of western North America, montane glaciers that had melted entirely reformed shortly before 5000 BP. The most severe part of the best documented neoglacial period, especially in Europe and the North Atlantic, is termed the "Little Ice Age".

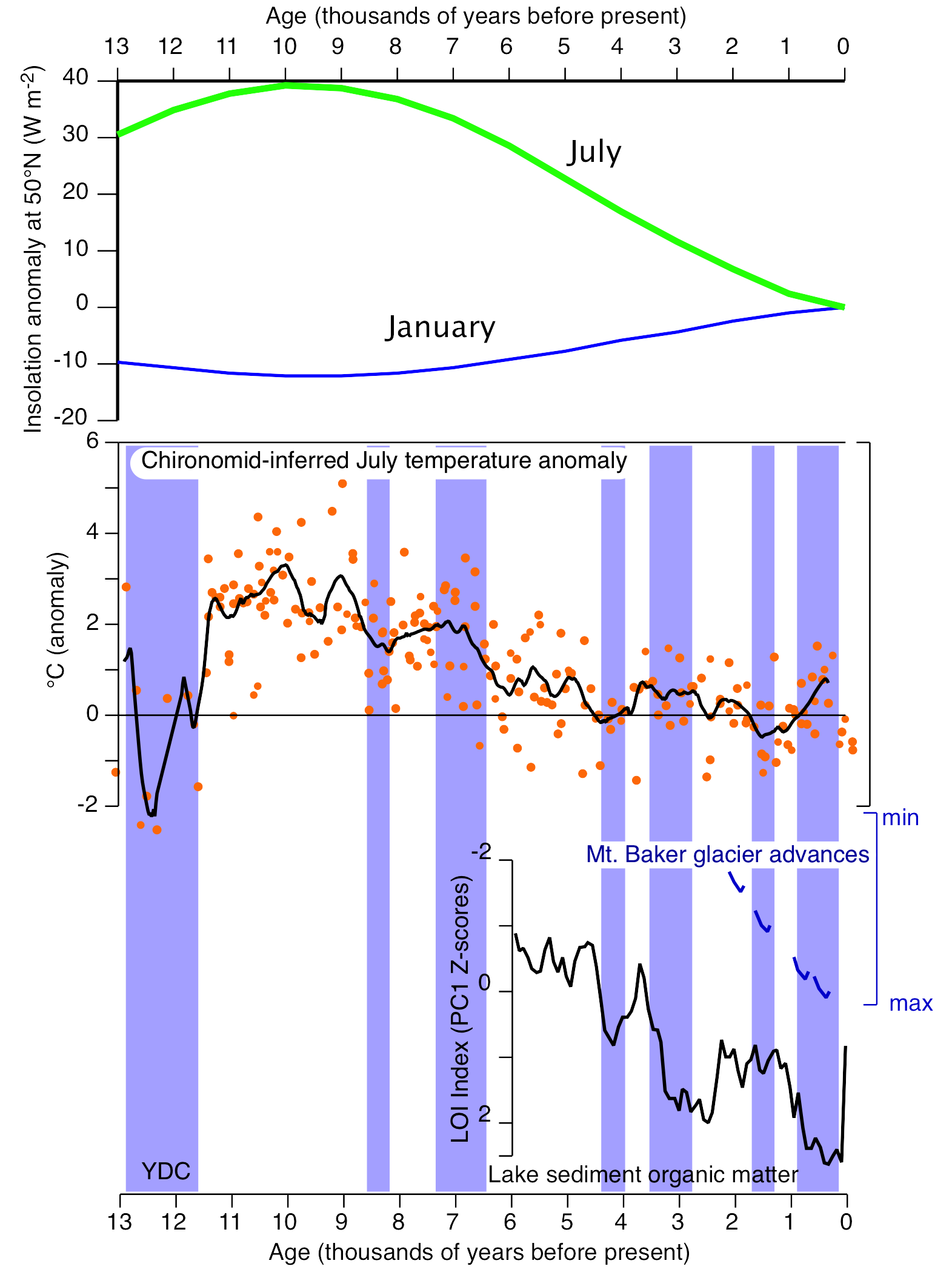
Holocene climate reconstructions and glacial-advance records from western Canada. Data compiled from published studies

In North America, neoglaciation had ecological effects in the spread of muskeg on flat, poorly drained land, such as the bed of recently drained Lake Agassiz and in the Hudson Bay lowlands, in the retreat of grassland before an advancing forest border in the Great Plains, and in shifting ranges of forest trees and diagnostic plant species (identified through palynology).

In East Asia, the start of neoglaciation coincided with a major weakening of the East Asian Summer Monsoon (EASM).

== See also ==
- Neopluvial
- Holocene
- Subboreal
