= Silver Lake (Mojave) =

Lake in the state of California, United States

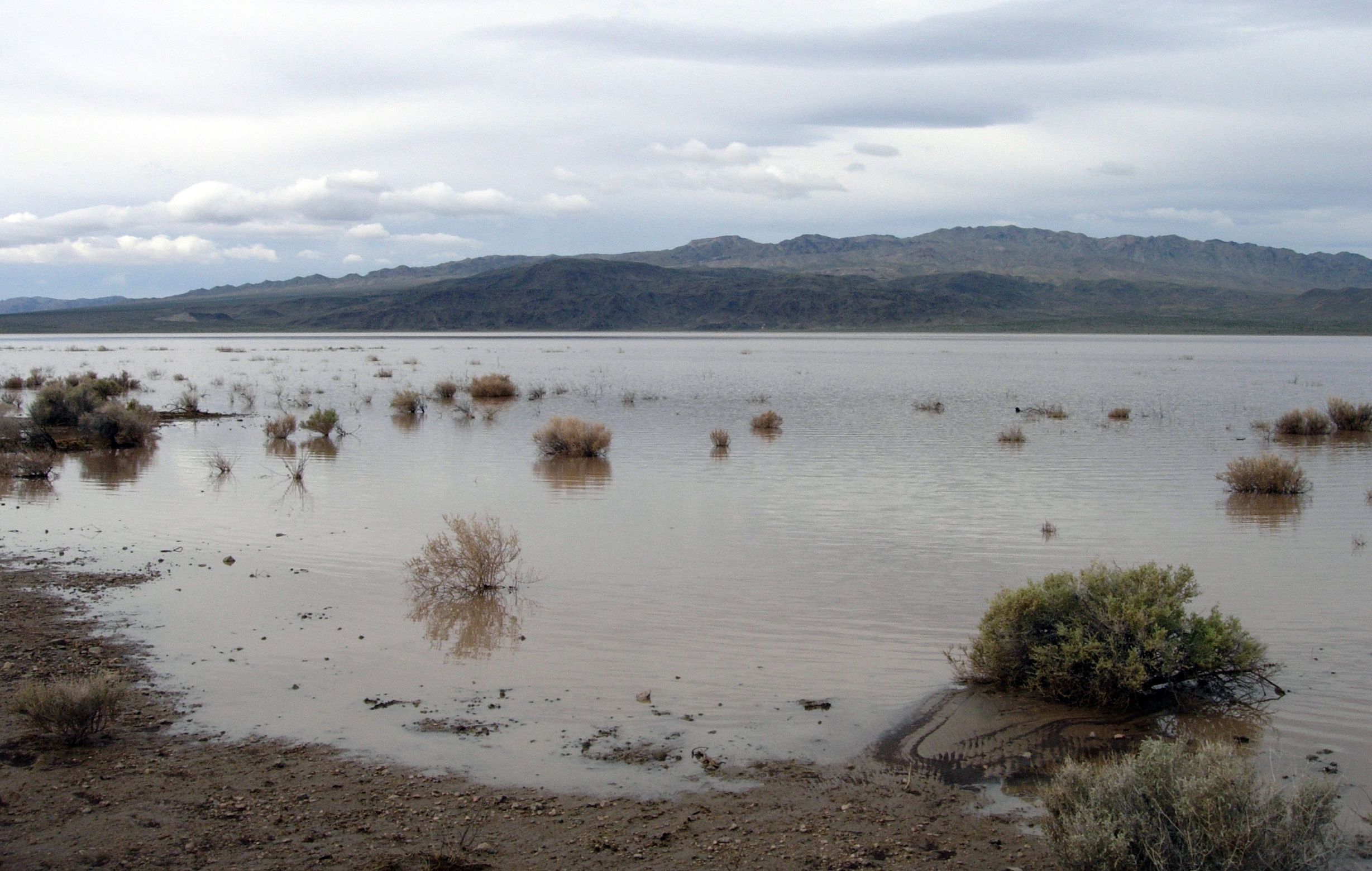
- Silver Lake after a flood in March 2005.

- Location within California Location within the United States
- Location: Mojave Desert; San Bernardino County, California
- Coordinates: 35°20′17″N 116°06′32″W
- Type: Endorheic basin
- Primary inflows: Mojave River
- Primary outflows: Terminal (evaporation)
- Basin countries: United States
- Max. length: 12 km (7.5 mi)
- Max. width: 5 km (3.1 mi)
- Shore length^{1}: 30 km (19 mi)
- Surface elevation: 280 m (920 ft)
- Settlements: Baker, California
- References: U.S. Geological Survey Geographic Names Information System: Silver Lake
- ^{1} Shore length is not a well-defined measure.

Silver Lake is a dry lake bed in the Mojave Desert of San Bernardino County, California, along Interstate 15, 100 km (62 mi) northeast of Barstow.

== History ==
Silver Lake, along with the adjacent Soda Lake, is what remains of Lake Mojave, a large, perennial lake that existed through the Holocene.

== Geography ==
The Mojave River terminates at Soda Lake, but the river has flowed into Silver Lake in historic times (as recently as the very wet winter of 2004–2005). A channel that has been modified by humans exists between the lakes. The lake occasionally has water, but is usually dry.

Silver Lake does not have salt crusts, like Soda Lake does, because the groundwater is deeper. Salt crusts form from the repeated capillary rise of salty groundwater, followed by evaporation.
