= Limnocythere bradburyi =

Scientific classification
- Domain: Eukaryota
- Kingdom: Animalia
- Phylum: Arthropoda
- Class: Ostracoda
- Order: Podocopida
- Family: Limnocytheridae
- Genus: Limnocythere
- Species: L. bradburyi

Binomial name
- Limnocythere bradburyi Forester, 1985

Species of seed shrimp

Limnocythere bradburyi is a species of crustacean belonging to the family Limnocytheridae.

It is native to Northern America.
