= Pluvial lake =

Landlocked basin (endorheic basin)

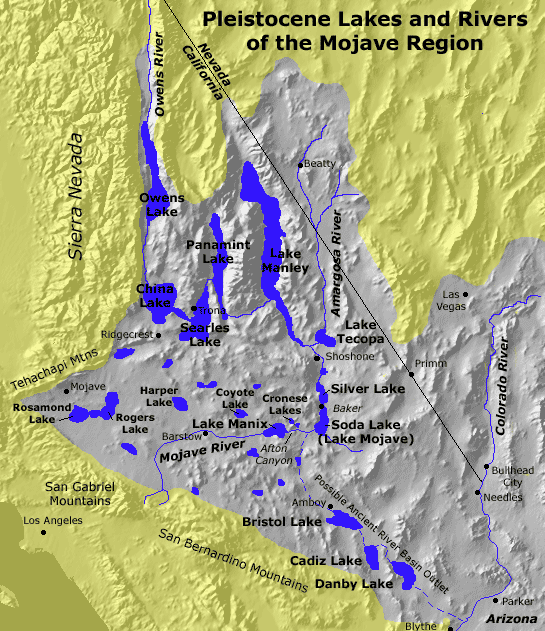
Pleistocene pluvial lakes and rivers of the Mojave Desert

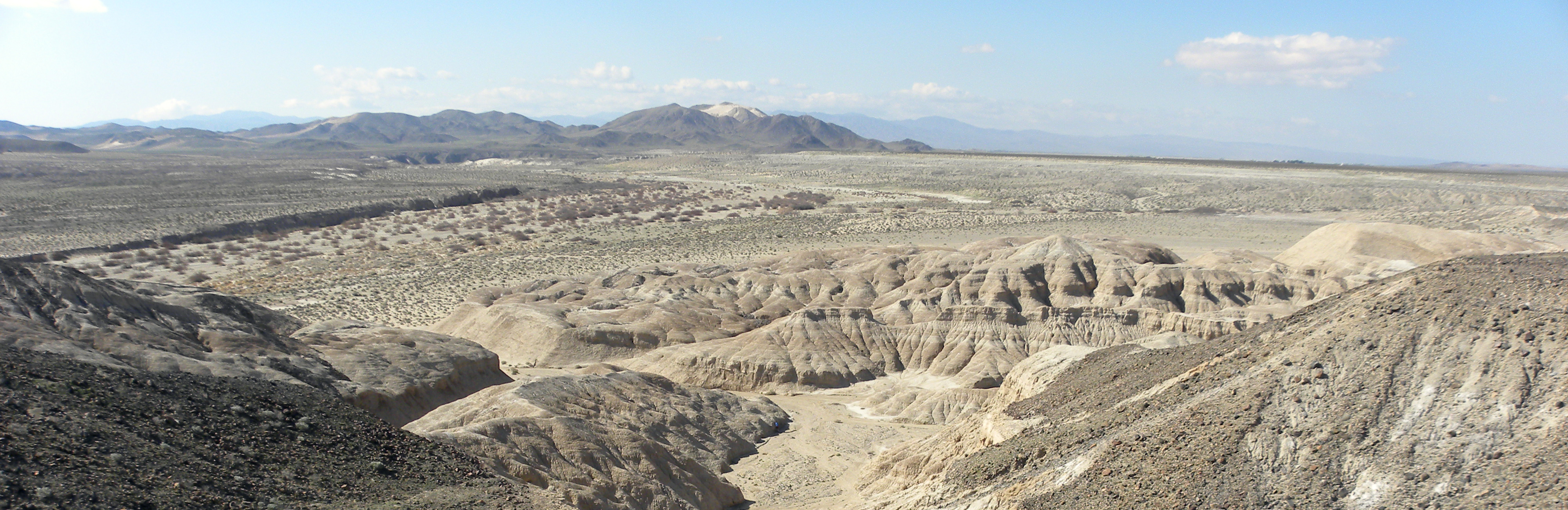
Pluvial Lake Manix sediments (Pleistocene) in the Mojave Desert near Barstow, California.

Ice Age pluvial lakes in the western United States

A pluvial lake is a body of water that accumulated in a basin because of a greater moisture availability resulting from changes in temperature and/or precipitation. These intervals of greater moisture availability are not always contemporaneous with glacial periods. Pluvial lakes are typically closed lakes that occupied endorheic basins. Pluvial lakes that have since evaporated and dried out may also be referred to as paleolakes.

== Etymology ==
The word comes from the Latin pluvia, which means "rain".

== Geology ==
Pluvial lakes represent changes in the hydrological cycle: wet cycles generate large lakes, and dry cycles cause the lakes to recede. Accumulated sediments show the variation in water level. During glacial periods, when the lake level is fairly high, mud sediments will settle out and be deposited. At times in between glaciers (interglacial), salt deposits may be present because of the arid climate and the evaporation of lakewater.

Several pluvial lakes formed in what is now the southwestern United States during the glaciation of the late Pleistocene. One of these was Lake Bonneville in western Utah, which covered roughly 19,000 square miles (49,000 km^{2}). When Lake Bonneville was at its maximum water level, it was 1,000 feet (300 m) higher than the Great Salt Lake.

Fresh water mollusks have been found in mud deposits from Searles Lake in California and suggest that the water temperature was about 7 degrees Fahrenheit (or 4 degrees Celsius) cooler than current temperatures. Radiocarbon dating of the youngest mud beds yield dates from 24,000 to 12,000 years ago.

== Formation ==
When warm air from arid regions meets chilled air from glaciers, cloudy, cool, rainy weather is created beyond the terminus of the glacier. That humid climate was present during the last glacial period in North America and caused more precipitation than evaporation. The increase in rainfall fills the drainage basin and forms a lake.

During interglacial periods, the climate becomes arid once more and causes the lakes to evaporate and dry up.

== See also ==
- Lake Bonneville
- Lake Eyre, Australia
- Lake Lahontan
- Lake Manix
- Great Salt Lake
- Lake Manly
- Neopluvial
- Proglacial lake
- CA-SCR-177 "Lake Cabonera"
