= Soda Lake (San Bernardino County) =

Lake in the state of California, United States

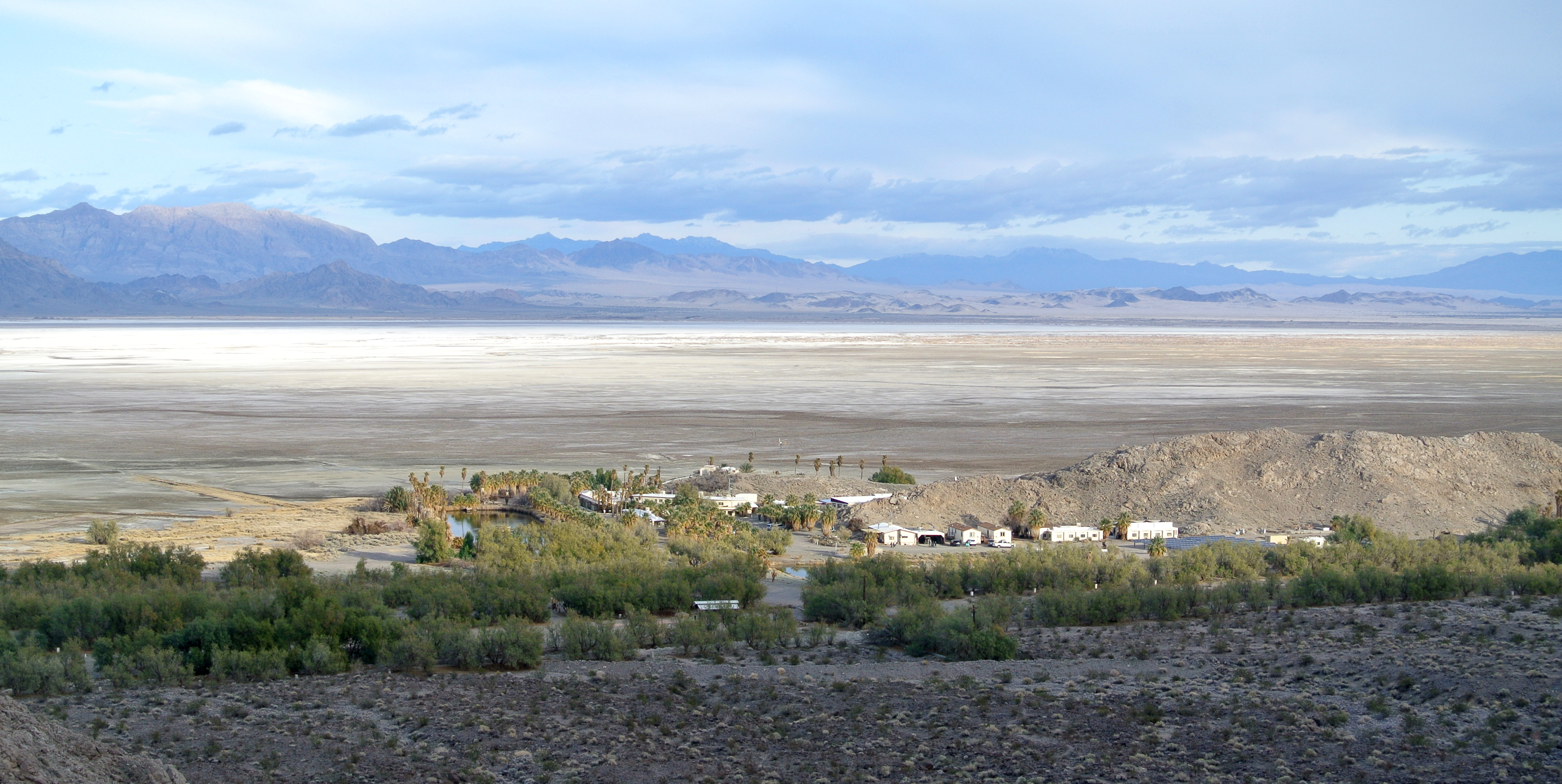
- Soda Lake, San Bernardino County, California. Zzyzx and the Desert Studies Center in the foreground.

- Location within California Location within the United States
- Location: Mojave National Preserve; San Bernardino County, California
- Coordinates: 35°09′55″N 116°04′17″W
- Type: Endorheic basin
- Primary inflows: Mojave River
- Primary outflows: Terminal (evaporation)
- Basin countries: United States
- Max. length: 24 km (15 mi)
- Max. width: 10 km (6.2 mi)
- Shore length^{1}: 75 km (47 mi)
- Surface elevation: 288 m (945 ft)
- Settlements: Baker, California; Zzyzx, California
- References: U.S. Geological Survey Geographic Names Information System: Soda Lake
- ^{1} Shore length is not a well-defined measure.

Soda Lake (or Soda Dry Lake) is a dry lake at the terminus of the Mojave River in the Mojave Desert of San Bernardino County, California. The lake has standing water during wet periods, and water can be found beneath the surface.

Soda Lake along with Silver Lake are what remains of the large, perennial, Holocene Lake Mojave. The waters of the lake, now with no outlet, evaporate and leave alkaline evaporites of sodium carbonate and sodium bicarbonate.

Soda Lake is located on the southern side of Interstate 15, and can be seen at the Zzyzx Road interchange and the Oat Ditch bridge, as well as the Soda Lake bridge (signed as the Mojave River) looking south from the city of Baker.

== Modern Relevance ==
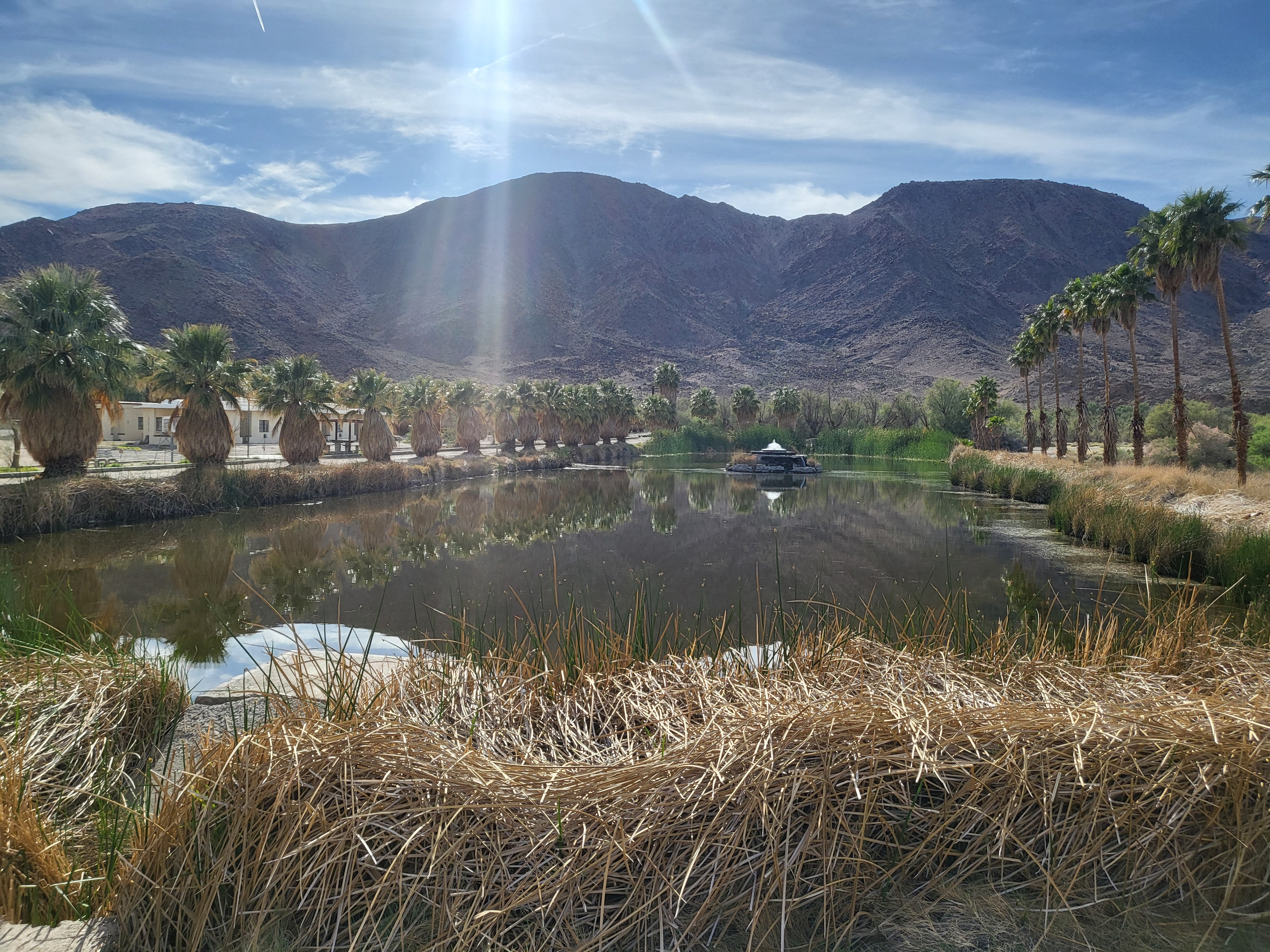
Facility and Research Site

CSU Desert Studies Center

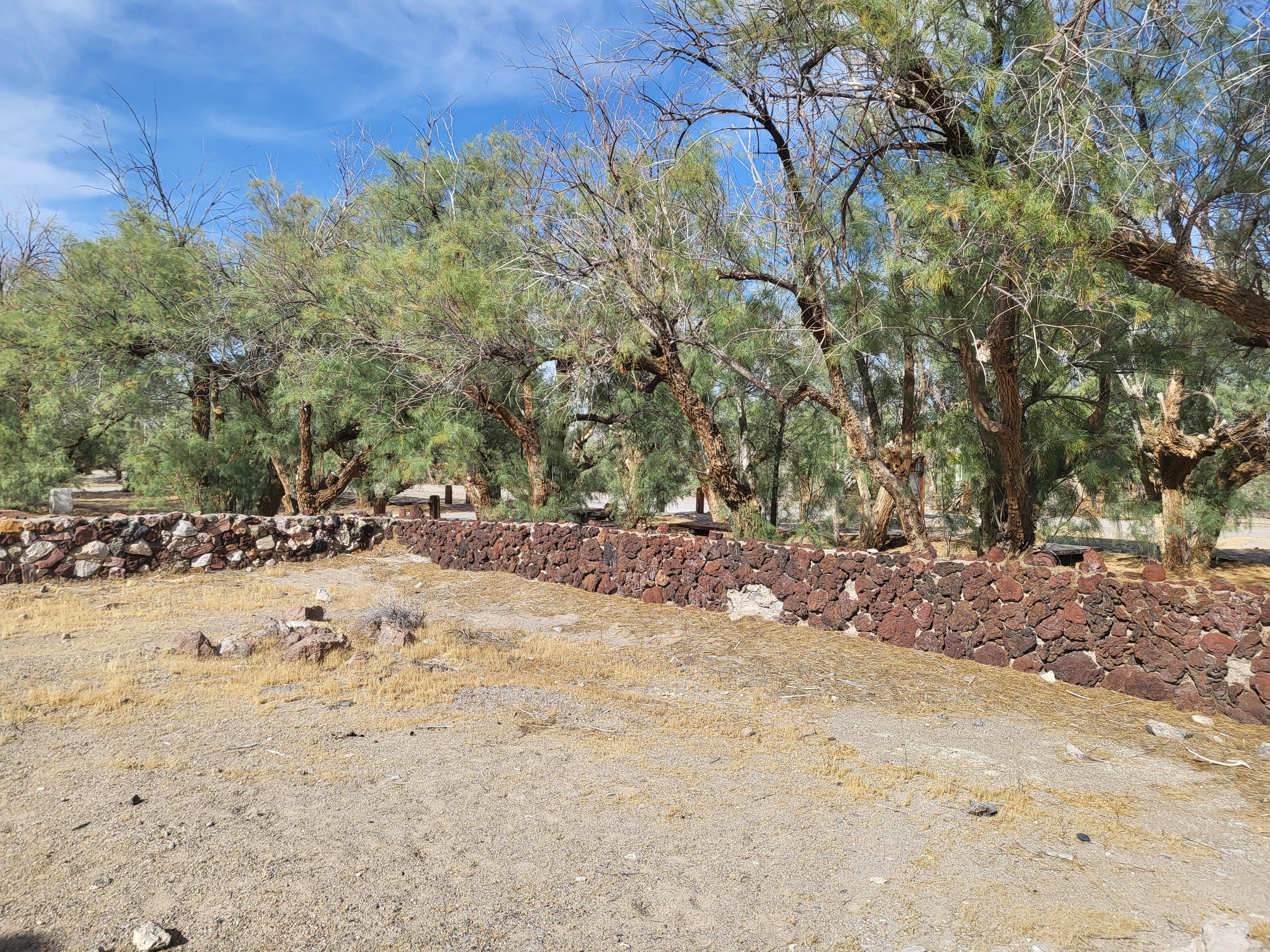
The parking lot and infrastructure of the site

The California State University Desert Studies Center, also known as CSU Desert Science Center, is located on Zzyzx Rd in Baker, CA, near the Soda Lake site operated by California State University, Fullerton. “The DSC is an ideal location for courses and research in the Soda Springs area, including …biology, ecology, meteorology, geology, archaeology, anthropology, geography, history, and other disciplines related to the study of California’s three deserts.”

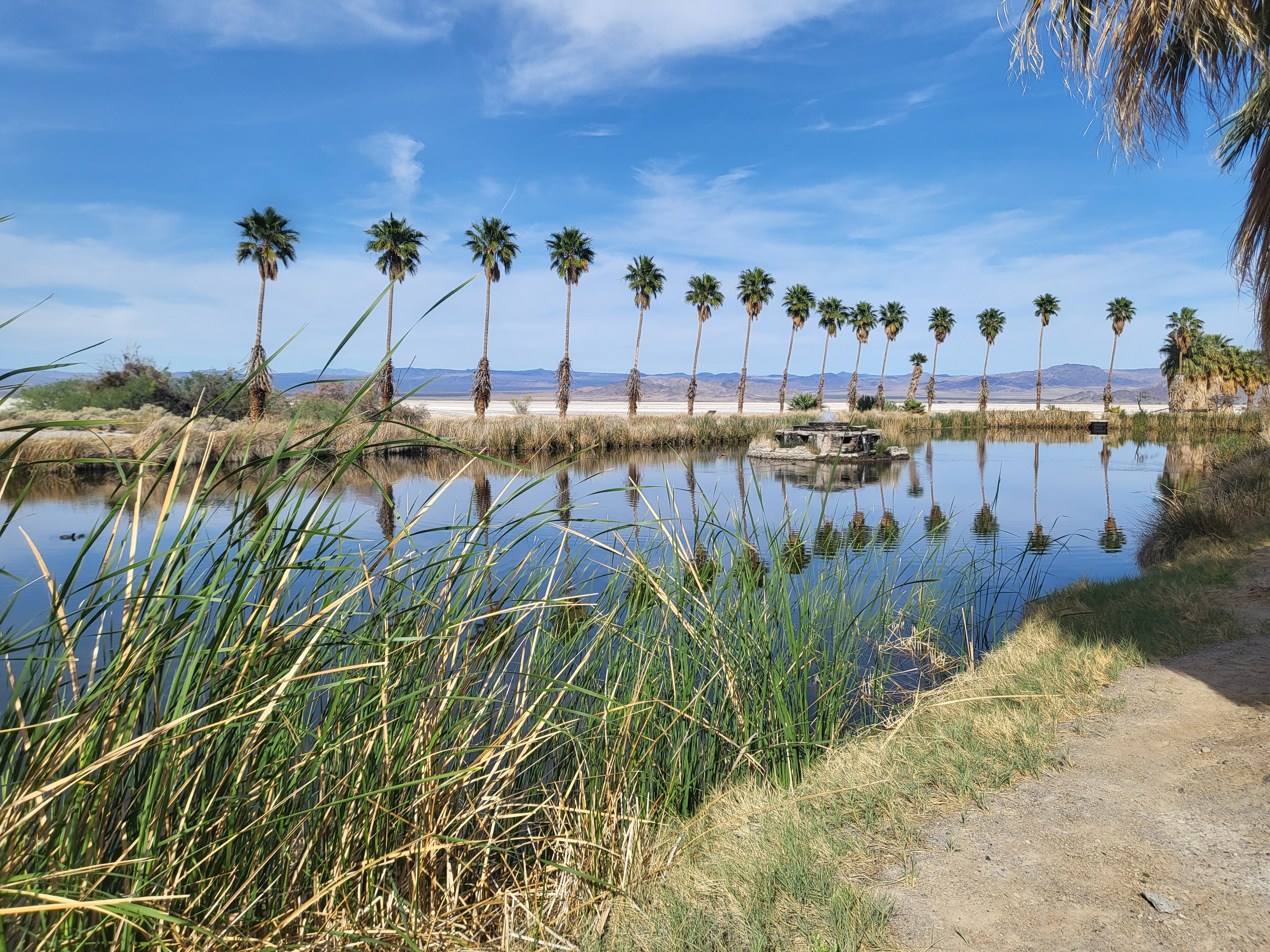
Oasis Pond for Research

== Historical Overview ==
Archaeological a geological research indicates that the Soda Lake basin was formerly part of pluvial Lake Mojave during the Late Quaternary period. Paleohydrological studies demonstrates that Lake Mojave occupied the basin approximately 20,000 years ago during wetter climatic conditions before drying as the regional climate became more arid, resulting in the present-day playa and evaporite deposits. Archaeological investigations at the nearby Baker Site have also identified evidence of prehistoric lithic production, including the use of local rhyolite sources for stone tool manufacture. Analysis of recovered artifacts has led researchers to interpret portions of the Baker Site as a quarry and workshop area used by prehistoric hunter-gatherer groups.

Zzyzx Mineral Springs and Health Resort

Front-exterior view of main building at the Desert Studies Center, Zzyzx, California

“In 1944, everything changed for Zzyzx. A man named Curtis Springer moved to the area and opened up a mining claim here that eventually turned him into a millionaire.” “Throughout the 1940s, he developed and operated Zzyzx Mineral Springs and Health Resort on his mining claim lands.” “The grounds consisted of a two-story castle, a dining hall, a library, a lecture room, a pool house, a goat farm, and rabbit rooms.” “Over the 30 years that he managed the resort, he shipped over 4 million packages all over the country, including Antediluvian Herb Tea, Nerve Cell Food, and Hollywood Pep Cocktail.” “The nearby town of Baker had to build a post office just to accommodate his mail.” “By the late 1960s, things started to fall apart for Curtis Springer.” “Although many customers were very satisfied with his products, complaints started increasing.” “After all, a former employee described Doc Springer’s formula as 10% crust from Soda Lake and 90% Epsom salts.” “Finally, the Bureau of Land Management stepped in to dispute Mr. Springer’s mining claims on the land he operated on. After spending a couple months in jail for the worst of his charges, he lived out the rest of his life in Las Vegas.”

== Archaeological Context ==
Ethnographic Data

Cultural Complexes

“Many (indigenous complexes) did not have a set or territory with well-defined and defended borders.” “In many cases, a group would have a core area and a peripheral area that may have overlapped with the peripheral areas of other groups.” The Lake Mojave region, where the “modern-day Soda and Silver Playa Lakes” are located, “provided animals and humans(paleoindians complexes) with potable water and humans (paleoindians complexes) with floral and faunal resources and fine-grained volcanic (FGV) lithic raw material.”

Landscape Archaeology

Archaeologists have noted a pattern between gender activities and the landscapes within the family camps of the Soda Lake region that has led them to further their studies about the people that occupied these lands. Most of the archaeological evidence has been found in mounds which helps to demonstrate that these groups used an array of tools to help them hunt and gather animals and plants.The inhabitants social structure was created in a way that the labor was divided between them and it was mostly based on their genders. The women would harvest the seeds and the fruits while the men hunted deer, making everyone put in some kind of work to achieve a common societal goal. It was very common for families to move from one camp to another because the landscape had to be able to provide them with the proper abundance of resources to keep the colony alive.

Paleoecology

Evidence from archaeological and paleoenvironmental studies indicates that the Soda Lake basin supported different ecological conditions during the late Pleistocene and early Holocene than are present in the modern Mojave Desert. Research suggests the area surrounding prehistoric Lake Mojave contained wetter conditions and more abundant vegetation, with pollen analysis indicating the presence of plant communities distinct from the desert shrubs that dominate the region today. These environmental conditions are thought to have supported both animal populations and human settlement along the former lake margins.

Archaeological surveys around Soda Lake have identified stone artifacts and lithic debris dating to the late Pleistocene and early Holocene along former shoreline areas. Distribution patterns of flakes and stone tools suggest that prehistoric populations adjusted tool production and settlement activities in response to shifting lake levels as Lake Mojave gradually receded.

== Descendants and Origin ==
The terminal Pleistocene/Early Holocene (TP-EH) foraging descendants known to inhabit the region to this day are the Kawaiisu, Chemehuevi, and others. "The Kawaiisu Nation (Mugunuwii) is the ancient tribe of the Great Basin Desert, whose creation site is Coso Range near Ridgecrest, California." (citation, website) "They cover over 300 miles of modern-day CA," and transversed the now known areas of "Kern, Riverside, San Luis Obispo...," and San Bernardino districts. The Chemehuevi “people, a peaceful and nomadic Tribe whose territory (also) once covered parts of California, Utah, Arizona, and Southern Nevada.” Chemehuevis “are considered to be the most southern group of the Southern Paiute Indians, who are linguistically related to the greater Uto-Aztecan language family which includes languages spoken by peoples from the Great Basin south into central Mexico.” The tribal reservation, was established in 1970 by Executive Order, and is located on the shores of Lake Havasu, in southeastern California on the Arizona border; 25 miles of the reservation boundary run along the shores of the lake, and 27 acres are located on prime lakefront property.

Human Environment Interaction

The landscape of Soda Lake was very important to the prehistoric people who once roamed it and who camped on its shores. These camps leave traces that help us understand past cultural practices which were essential to understanding their ways of life. Archaeologist Dr. Byerly has noted that these camp sites were created in specific places due to resource availability. Researchers have found evidence of camps near reliable water sources and seasonally available resources, such as mesquit suggesting that prehistoric inhabitants valued being close to resources. Landscape archeology has allowed researchers to access campsites to then study Soda Lake's site collections because landscape archeology focuses on how the people of the past understood the land around them.

== See also ==
- List of lakes in California
- Kelso Wash
- Zzyzx, California
- Baker, California
