= Limnocythere =

Scientific classification
- Kingdom: Animalia
- Phylum: Arthropoda
- Class: Ostracoda
- Order: Podocopida
- Family: Limnocytheridae
- Genus: Limnocythere; Brady, 1868

Genus of seed shrimps

Limnocythere is a genus of ostracod crustaceans in the family Limnocytheridae.

== Species ==
It contains the following extant species :

- Limnocythere bradburyi Forester, 1985
- Limnocythere camera Delorme, 1967
- Limnocythere ceriotuberosa (Delorme, 1967)
- Limnocythere curvispinosa Jiang, Wang, Ge, Xie, Duan, Fan & Zhai 2025
- Limnocythere floridensis Keyser, 1976
- Limnocythere friabilis Benson & MacDonald, 1963
- Limnocythere glypta Dobbin, 1941
- Limnocythere herricki Staplin, 1963
- Limnocythere hungarica Daday, 1900
- Limnocythere illinoisensis Sharpe, 1897
- Limnocythere inopinata (Baird, 1843)
- Limnocythere iowensis Danforth, 1948
- Limnocythere itasca Cole, 1949
- Limnocythere liporeticulata Delorme, 1968
- Limnocythere ornata Furtos, 1933
- Limnocythere oughtoni Tressler, 1957
- Limnocythere paraornata Delorme, 1971
- Limnocythere parascutariensis Delorme, 1971
- Limnocythere platyforma Delorme, 1971
- Limnocythere porphyretica De Deckker, 1981
- Limnocythere posterolimba Delorme, 1967
- Limnocythere pseudoreticulata Staplin, 1963
- Limnocythere reticulata Sharpe, 1897
- Limnocythere sanctipatricii Brady & D. Robertson, 1869
- Limnocythere sappaensis Staplin, 1963
- Limnocythere sharpei Staplin, 1963
- Limnocythere staplini Gutentag & Benson, 1962
- Limnocythere trapeziformis Staplin, 1963
- Limnocythere varia Staplin, 1963
- Limnocythere verrucosa Hoff, 1942

== Literature ==
- Martens, K. & S. Savatenalinton, 2011. A subjective checklist of the Recent, free-living, non-marine Ostracoda (Crustacea). Zootaxa 2855: 1-79.
