= Silver Lake, San Bernardino County, California =

Silver Lake
- Ghost town
- Location within the state of California Silver Lake (the United States)
- Coordinates: 35°22′16″N 116°6′54″W
- Country: United States
- State: California
- County: San Bernardino
- Time zone: UTC-8 (Pacific (PST))
  - Summer (DST): UTC-7 (PDT)
- GNIS feature ID: 249476

Silver Lake is a town that existed near the Tonopah and Tidewater Railroad, six miles (9.7 km) north of Baker, in the Mojave Desert of San Bernardino County, California.

When the railroad ceased to operate in 1940, the town was abandoned. It is now mostly collapsed buildings.

== See also ==
- Lists of ghost towns in the United States
