= Limnocytheridae =

Scientific classification
- Kingdom: Animalia
- Phylum: Arthropoda
- Clade: Pancrustacea
- Class: Ostracoda
- Order: Podocopida
- Family: Limnocytheridae; Klie, 1938

Family of seed shrimps

Limnocytheridae is a family of ostracods, containing the following genera:

- Cytheridella Daday, 1905
- Gomphocythere Sars, 1924
- Leptocytheromorpha Purper, 1979†
- Limnocythere Brady, 1968
- Minicythere Ornellas, 1974
