= C3orf52 =

Chromosome 3 open reading frame 52

Identifiers
- Aliases: C3orf52, TTMP, chromosome 3 open reading frame 52
- External IDs: OMIM: 611956; MGI: 2384848; GeneCards: C3orf52

Gene location (Human)
Chr.	Chromosome 3 (human)
Band	3q13.2	Start	112,086,335 bp
Band	3q13.2	End	112,131,004 bp

Gene location (Mouse)
Chr.	Chromosome 16 (mouse)
Band	16|16 B5	Start	45,447,211 bp
Band	16|16 B5	End	45,474,431 bp
RNA expression pattern
Bgee	Human / Mouse (ortholog); Top expressed in: skin of leg; skin of abdomen; body of pancreas; rectum; islet of Langerhans; mucosa of transverse colon; thyroid gland; left lobe of thyroid gland; epithelium of colon; body of stomach / Top expressed in: left colon; gastric mucosa; mucous cell of stomach; jejunum; epithelium of stomach; intestinal villus; duodenum; conjunctival fornix; lobe of prostate; skin of external ear; More reference expression data
BioGPS	n/a
Orthologs
Databases	NCBI: entry; OMA: entry
Species	Human	Mouse
Entrez	79669	212998
Ensembl	ENSG00000114529; ENSG00000285394	ENSMUSG00000033187
UniProt	Q5BVD1	Q8C5C9
RefSeq (mRNA)	NM_001171747; NM_024616	NM_145389
RefSeq (protein)	NP_001165218; NP_078892	NP_663364
Location (UCSC)	Chr 3: 112.09 – 112.13 Mb	Chr 16: 45.45 – 45.47 Mb
PubMed search
- Wikidata
View/Edit Human	View/Edit Mouse

Chromosome 3 open reading frame 5 (C3orf52), also known as TTMP or TPA-Induced Transmembrane Protein (accession: NP_078892), is an uncharacterized protein encoded in humans by the C3orf52 gene. C3orf52 is located on the plus strand of chromosome 3, at gene locus q.13.2. C3orf52 encodes a transmembrane protein which is believed to be responsible for regulating some aspect of epithelial tissue and evidence supports a theory of C3orf52 acting in some capacity to impact hair loss in humans due to interactions with lysophosphatidic acid production required for hair follicle formation.

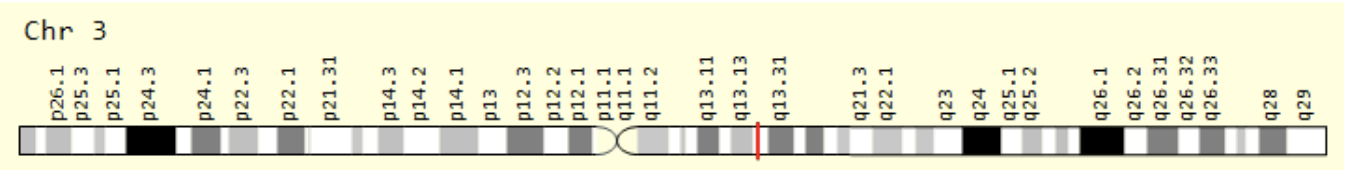
Figure 1. Ideogram of Chromosome 3 showing location of C3orf52 gene in humans

== Expression patterns ==
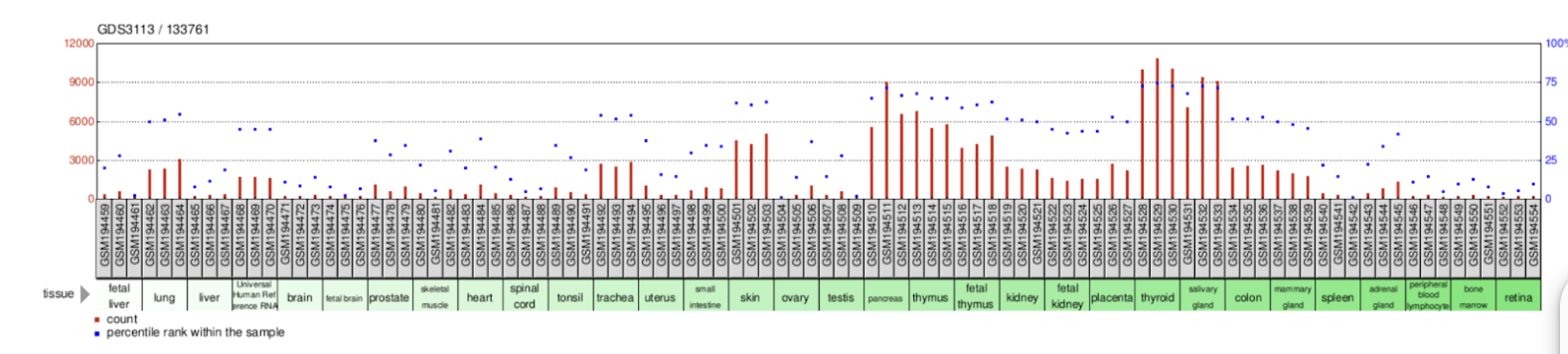
Figure 2. Expression within various normal human tissues (GDS3113). Highest expression is shown in the thyroid and salivary gland, holding consistently higher percentile rank within those tissue samples. The second highest expression is shown in the pancreas and the thymus. Expression in all of the other tissue samples is relatively low. Microarray is from NCBI GEO Profiles on C3orf52.

Analysis of C3orf52 samples throughout the human body has indicated that the protein displays approximately fourfold variation throughout the body and that C3orf52 is tissue-restricted and highly regulated in its expressions. The highest concentration of the protein is found in the thyroid and salivary glands, while there have been moderate concentrations reported in the skin, pancreas, and stomach.

Immunohistochemical micrographs from The Human Protein Atlas show that C3orf52 is expressed in colon and stomach tissues, with concentrations of the protein found along the luminal borders of the epithelial cells in the colon. This suggests that C3orf52 expression is membrane-associated in nature.

== Molecular features ==
=== mRNA ===
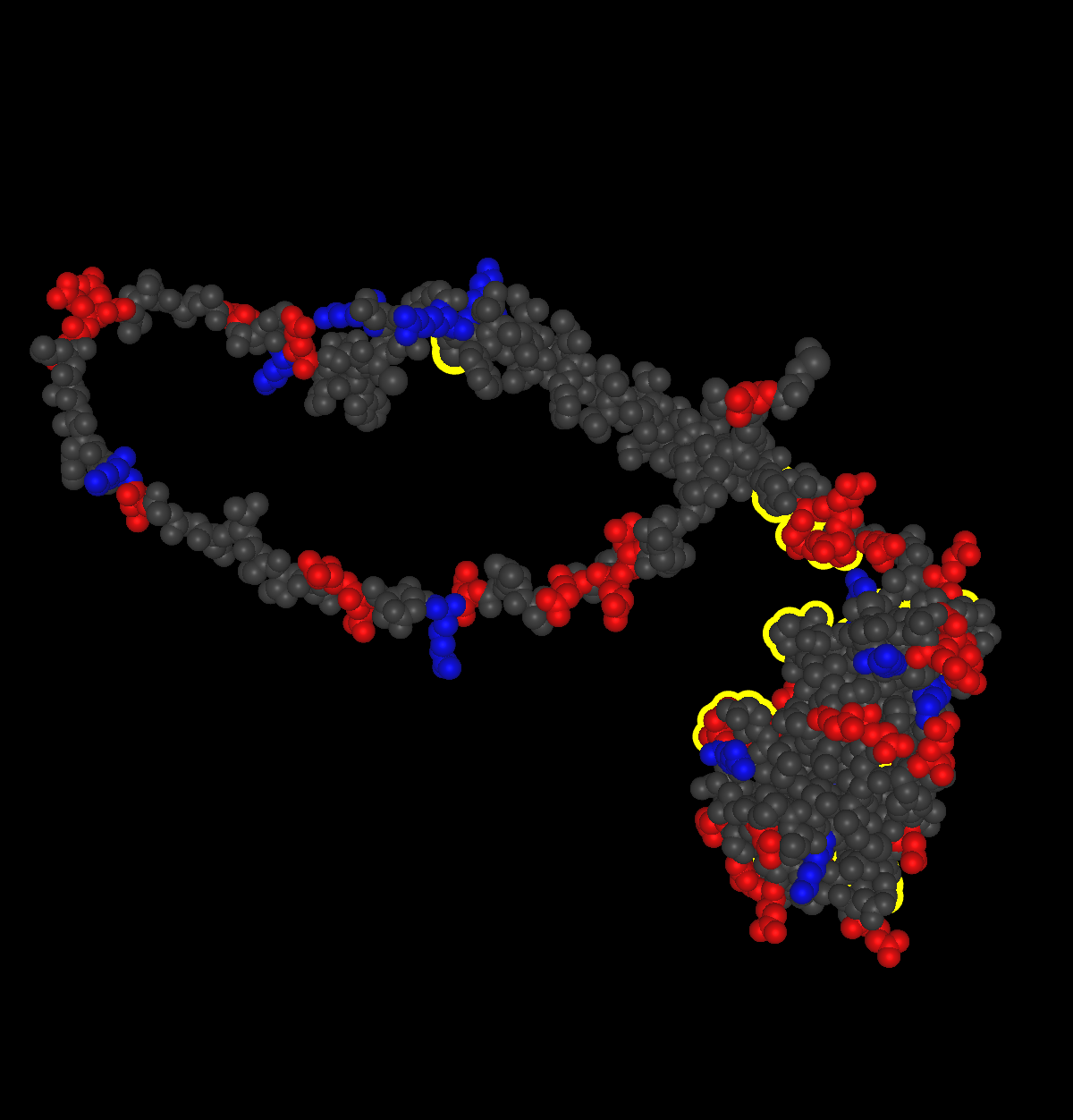
Figure 1. 3D predicted secondary structure of C3orf52 annotated to show charge as well as the highest conserved amino acids among orthologs. Negative residues are colored in red, positive residues are in blue, and conserved amino acids are in yellow.

C3orf52 has two transcript variants. Transcript variant 1 is a shorter transcript (753 nucleotides) but encodes a longer isoform (TPA-induced transmembrane protein isoform 1). Transcript variant 2 (654 nucleotides) encodes a shorter isoform (TPA- induced transmembrane protein isoform 2) with a different C-terminus. Transcript variant 2 consists of six exons.

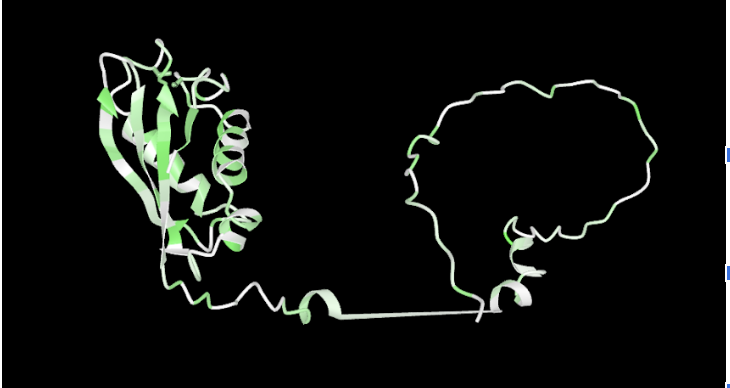
Figure 2. 3D predicted secondary structure of C3orf52 annotated to show hydrophobicity. Hydrophobic residues are shown in dark green, and polar residues are in light green.

=== Protein ===
C3orf52 consists of a disordered region, a transmembrane region, and a major polyA site. The molecular weight is of 24.3 kDa. This protein is predicted to be localized primarily in the cytoplasm (94.1%), with specific localization to the endoplasmic reticulum (44.4%).

The protein is associated with two distinct isoforms; isoform 1 is 250 amino acids long, while isoform 2 is 217 amino acids long. In human research, isoform 2 is the predominant variation found and is the most common focus for research on C3orf52.

Compositional analysis has indicated that this protein is acidic in nature, with a predicted isoelectric point of 3.99. Additionally, results show a high-scoring transmembrane segment spanning amino acids 66 to 93, which is also among the protein's most hydrophobic segment. C3orf52 contains a repetitive four-amino acid motif, including a sequence reading "LELS" at amino acids 13-16 and repeating at positions 101–104, this region is not conserved among orthologs.

== Post-translational modifications ==
Human C3orf52 is predicted to contain three phosphorylation sites at positions 140,180, and 183, two N-glycosylation sites at positions 106 and 159, and three O-linked glycosylation sites at positions 7, 26, and 37. All of the O-linked glycosylation sites are within the disordered region of this protein. This indicates that C3orf52 is a moderately regulated protein that likely functions more as a scaffold than as a structural protein.

== Evolutionary history ==
=== Paralogs ===
An NCBI protein BLAST search showed no known paralogs of C3orf52 in humans.

=== Orthologs ===
C3orf52 retains its sequence with identifiable orthologs exclusively within vertebrates (see Table 1 below), specifically up to the elasmobranchii lineage, but is absent in more distantly related groups. Outside of vertebrates, including all invertebrate animals, bacteria, archaea, fungi, plants, and protists, no identifiable sequence homology is detected for this protein. The most distant homolog detected of C3orf52 was in the elephant shark (Callorhinchus milli), which diverged about 495.2 million years before humans, suggesting that this is approximately when the C3orf52 gene first arose.

Table 1. Human C3orf52 orthologs sorted by estimated date of divergence from humans and protein sequence identity
Genus and species	Common name	Taxonomic group	Date of divergence (MYA)	Sequence length (AA)	AA identity (%)	AA similarity (%)	Accession number
Homo sapiens	Human	Primates	0	217	100	100	NP_078892.3
Pan troglodytes	Chimpanzee	Primates	6.4	217	97	98	XP_001154447.2
Trachypithecus francoisi	Francois' leaf monkey	Primates	28.8	217	89	93	XP_033067213.1
Equus przewalskii	Przewalski's horse	Perissodactyla	94	250	77	87	XP_008528528.1
Diceros bicornis minor	South-central black rhinoceros	Perissodactyla	94	251	74	85	XP_058411758.1
Tachyglossus aculeatus	Australian echidna	Monotremata	180	214	52	67	XP_038622330.1
Struthio camelus	Common ostrich	Struthioniformes	319	218	37	54	XP_068764855.1
Empidonax traillii	Willow flycatcher	Passeriformes	319	211	36	53	XP_027757055.1
Mauremys reevesii	Chinese pond turtle	Testudines	319	233	43	58	XP_039395838.1
Carettochelys insculpta	Pig-nosed turtle	Testudines	319	214	41	56	XP_074839613.1
Chelonoidis abingdonii	Pinta island tortoise	Testudines	319	218	40	54	XP_074928790.1
Ambystoma mexicanum	Axolotl	Caudata	352	239	42	56	XP_069492559.1
Rhinatrema bivittatum	Rhinatrema	Gymnophiona	352	217	41	60	XP_029434280.1
Pleurodeles waltl	Iberian ribbed newt	Caudata	352	236	40	52	XP_069060250.1
Microcaecilia unicolor	Tiny cayenne caecilian	Gymnophiona	352	225	39	58	XP_030060067.1
Siphateles boraxobius	Borax lake chub	Cypriniformes	429	248	34	52	XP_077063864.1
Acipenser ruthenus	Sterlet	Acipenseriformes	429	260	33	52	XP_058884635.1
Etheostoma spectabile	Orangethroat darter	Perciformes	429	268	32	49	XP_032360225.1
Pseudorasbora parva	Stone moroko	Cypriniformes	429	251	30	49	XP_067307703.1
Carcharodon carcharias	Great white shark	Lamnifores	462	376	29	50	XP_041067311.1
Callorhinchus milli	Elephant shark	Chimaeriformes	495	835	18	40	XP_007894202.1

=== Protein divergence ===
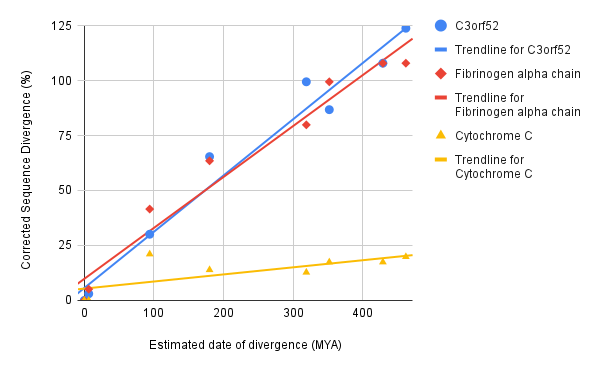
Figure 3. Evolutionary rate of C3orf52 compared to cytochrome c and fibrinogen alpha chain proteins

C3orf52 is evolving more quickly than other common proteins including cytochrome c and fibrinogen alpha chain. This would suggest some sort of selective pressure on the protein driving its rapid evolution.

== Protein interactions ==
Protein	ID	Description	Detection method	Subcellular location
Hypotrichosis 7	HYPT7	Mutations in the lipase H gene are linked to autosomal recessive hypotrichosis	affinity chromatography technology	Endoplasmic reticulum and luminal side of membranes
Chromosome 19 open reading frame 75	C19orf75	Uncharacterized protein	affinity chromatography technology	Predicted membrane-associated
Neonatal fragment crystallizable receptor	FCRN	Neonatal Fc receptor. Responsible for transferring immunity from mother to newborn	affinity chromatography technology	Endosomal membrane, plasma membrane, and endoplasmic reticulum
Transmembrane protein 30B	TMEM30B	Subunit of P4-ATPase complex which is involved in the transport of lipids across the cell membrane	affinity chromatography technology	Endoplasmic reticulum and plasma membrane
B-cell antigen receptor complex-associated protein beta chain	CD79b	Forms the B-cell receptors and is required to initiate signal cascade when antigen binds to B-cell	affinity chromatography technology	Plasma membrane
Platelet glycoprotein 4	CD36	Multifunctional glycoprotein that acts as a receptor for molecules such as fatty acids, collagen, and thrombospondin	affinity chromatography technology	Plasma membrane and endosome

Table 2. Protein interactions found using BioGrid. All interactions were physical interactions and had very confident significant scores.

A STRING protein association search yielded no confident results, or ones that seem significant based on previous findings.

== Conceptual translation ==
Figure 4. Conceptual translation of C3orf52 human gene and protein annotated with structural features, post-translational modifications, conserved amino acids, etc.

Conceptual translation of the human C3orf52 protein isoform 2, along with full mRNA and annotations is shown in Figure 4.

== Clinical significance ==
Several studies resulting in an initial information search on C3orf52 focused on the likely involvement of this gene in lipase H-mediated lysophosphatidic acid biosynthesis, a step in hair-follicle formation. Evidence shows that decreased expression of C3orf52 has been linked to localized autosomal recessive hypotrichosis, a condition resulting in the absence of hair. There were three relevant single-nucleotide polymorphisms found with clinical significance linked to hypotrichosis 15 (rs764787339, rs2472299130, rs545208237) (Table 2).

Apart from articles on the involvement of C3orf52 in hair loss, PubMed and Google Scholar provided a couple of other potential linkages between this gene and diseases, specifically a variety of cancers. One of the more eye-catching articles found associations of this gene in the development of multifocal and multicentric breast cancer, and is looking into it as a current marker for distinguishing multifocal and multicentric breast cancer from unifocal breast cancers.

Another study proposes looking at C3orf52 as a potential marker as a prognosis gene of cancer in a study looking at DNA copy number variations, which are common in cancer cells. Additionally, C3orf52 is linked to be downregulated in clear-cell renal cell carcinoma, and its reduced expression was linked to later disease stage and poorer overall survival of clear-cell renal cell carcinoma patients.

=== Single nucleotide polymorphisms ===
SNP	Position	Base change	AA change	Mutation type	Significance	Clinical significance
rs764787339	bp 34 AA	G to A G to C G to T	Glu12Lys Glu12Gln Glu12Ter	Missense variant Missense variant Stop gained	Within the disordered region; also within the very beginning of the coding sequence	Hypotrichosis 15
rs2472299130	bp 438 - 442 AA 148	N/A	Thr148fs (frameshift variant)	Deletion	Directly following a string of highly conserved AA	Hypotrichosis 15
rs545208237	bp 492	T to A T to C	Tyr164Ter Tyr164=	Stop gained Synonymous variant	On a conserved AA	Hypotrichosis 15
rs16859190	bp 331 AA 111	A to G	I to V	Missense variant	On a non-conserved AA within a string of conserved AA	None
rs340167	bp 430 AA 144	G to A G to C	G to R G to C	Missense variants	Within SEA domain	None
rs16859172	bp 197 AA 66	T to C	L to P	Missense variant	On a conserved AA, within transmembrane region	None
rs111954756	bp 566 AA 189	G to C	G to A	Missense variant	On a non-conserved AA within a string of conserved AA	None

Table 3. Summary of common single-nucleotide polymorphism mutations within human C3orf52 including their position of occurrence and significance. Single nucleotide polymorphisms were found using variation viewer.

SNP	Trait	Location
rs12053863-?	Glucose metabolism Hearing impairment	3:112100677
rs79754744-G	Eosinophil count	3:112111457
rs76093951-T	Bilirubin measurement	3:112117176
rs7649379-?	Eosinophil count	3:112121666
rs1492488-C	Eosinophil percentage of leukocytes	3:112122499

Table 4. Summary of GWAS catalog results. Majority of the results show immunity association within single nucleotide polymorphisms, particularly eosinophil count.
