= Curtis Howe Springer =

American radio evangelist (1896–1985)

- Springer in an advertisement from September 1930.
- Born: December 2, 1896; Birmingham, Alabama, US
- Died: August 19, 1985 (aged 88); Las Vegas, Nevada, US
- Occupation: Radio evangelist
- Spouse(s): Mary Louise Berkebile (divorced); Helen Springer
- Children: at least 2

Curtis Howe Springer (December 2, 1896 – August 19, 1985) was an American radio evangelist, self-proclaimed medical doctor and Methodist minister best known for founding the Zzyzx Mineral Springs resort located within Southern California's Mojave Desert. He was also the host of well-known evangelical syndicated radio programs that were broadcast throughout the United States for several decades.

Springer was in actuality neither a doctor nor a minister, and he described himself as the "last of the old-time medicine men." In 1969, the American Medical Association labeled him the "King of Quacks". In the early 1970s, the federal government discovered that Springer held no legal rights to the land where Zzyzx stood; consequently, he was evicted from the space and briefly imprisoned.

== Biography ==
=== Personal life ===
Curtis Howe Springer was born December 2, 1896, and hailed from Birmingham, Alabama. He was married to Mary Louise Berkebile. They separated at some point, and he married a woman named Helen. Springer had several children, including a daughter, Marilou, and a son, Curtis Jr., who later became a judge in Montgomery, Alabama.

=== Early career ===
He claimed to have been a private in the United States Army, where he taught boxing. In Springer's early life, he "drummed up crowds for William Jennings Bryan's tirades against demon rum" and was a sheet music vendor at Billy Sunday's evangelical services. Following World War I, Springer worked at a school in Florida. In the late 1920s, Springer moved to Chicago, where he became involved with an automotive technical school called Greer College. Springer was fired by 1930, and the school was forced into bankruptcy shortly afterward.

Throughout the 1930s, Curtis Springer gave lectures throughout the midwestern United States, claiming to either to be the "Dean of Greer College", or that he represented/attended the fictional institutions of the National Academy, The Springer School of Humanism, the American College of Doctors and Surgeons, the Westlake West Virginia College, and two non-existent osteopathy schools in Meyersdale, Pennsylvania and New Jersey. Although all his lectures were "free", Springer would ask for donations part-way through his speech, and often attempt to sell audience members private courses in psychoanalysis for $25 per session. In advertisements for his appearances, he would often follow his name with M.D., N.D., D.O. or Ph.D.

Chicago was largely Springer's home base until the summer of 1934. After he applied for airtime on WGN radio, the station contacted American Medical Association's Bureau of Investigations for information regarding Springer. The AMA and Better Business Bureau quickly began to take note of his completely falsified education record. Before long, Springer had been labeled as a notorious fraud and doctor-impersonator by the medical community. An extensive article in the September 14, 1936 edition of Journal of the American Medical Association titled "Curtis Howe Springer: A Quack and His Nostrums" detailed his exploits and lack of education. The book concluded that "a most thorough search fails to show that Springer was ever graduated by any reputable college or university, medical or otherwise."

=== Radio career ===
Although denied airtime on WGN, he was successful in obtaining a twice-daily slot as a radio evangelist on Chicago's WCFL. He began broadcasting on the station in 1934. His programs were often an outlet for his support of Franklin Roosevelt and The New Deal. In addition, he would often use the radio show to sell his "medicines", including the antacid Re-Hib (confirmed by the American Medical Association to be mostly baking soda) and Antediluvian Tea ("a crude mixture of laxative herbs").

Around 1935, Springer left Chicago and began preaching on KDKA in Pittsburgh, Pennsylvania.

=== Health spas and Zzyzx ===
Springer's wife Mary encouraged him to try to launch a health spa and in 1931, he launched a resort called Haven of Rest in Fort Hill, Pennsylvania. Only six years after it first opened, he lost Haven of Rest due to non-payment of taxes. He attempted to set up other resorts and gatherings in Wilkes-Barre, Johnstown, and Mount Davis in Pennsylvania; Cumberland, Maryland; and Davenport, Iowa.

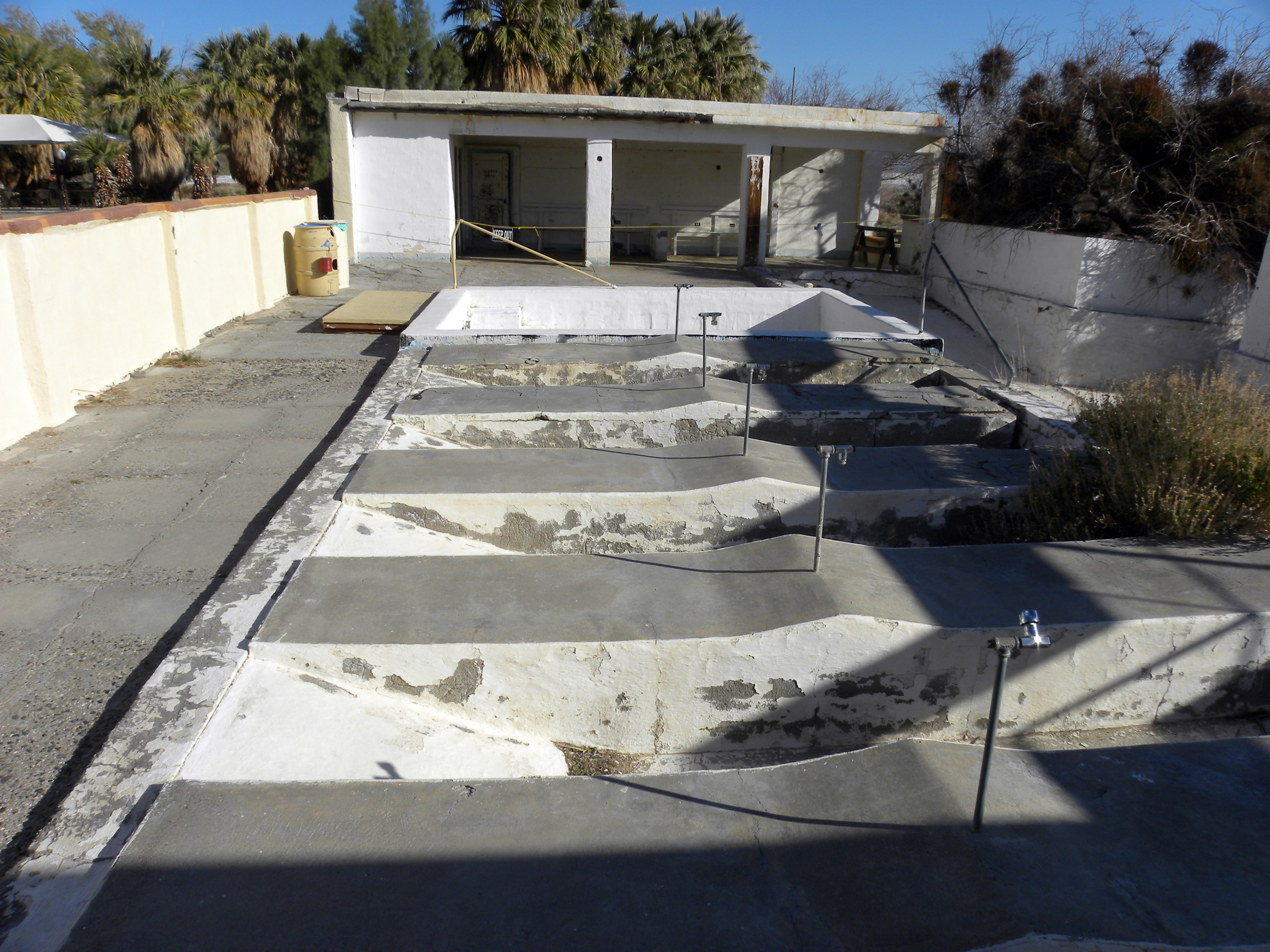
Remains of Springer's spa at Zzyzx, California.

In 1944, Springer and his new fiancée Helen filed a mining claim on federal land to 12,800 acres (51.8 km^{2}) in California's Mojave Desert, claiming a tract about 8 miles (13 km) long and 3 miles (4.8 km) wide. The land contained the remains of an 1860 Army post and a railroad station on the defunct Tonopah and Tidewater Railroad. He named the settlement Zzyzx as a gimmick to ensure that it would be "the last word" in health. Zzyzx's original encampment consisted of 20 tents, and he recruited homeless men from Los Angeles' Skid Row to build simple concrete buildings. Springer created an imitation hot springs – which he attempted to pass off as genuine – by using a boiler to heat several pools. In time, Springer erected a sixty-room hotel, a church, a cross-shaped health spa with mineral baths, a radio broadcast studio, a private airstrip dubbed "Zyport" and several other buildings which included a castle. The "Boulevard of Dreams" was a divided parkway leading to an oasis on Lake Tuendae, later identified as the habitat of the endangered Mohave chub. While building his retreat, he spent half the week in Los Angeles, still recording his radio program, and rounding up workers to build his new resort by offering room and board at Zzyzx in exchange for labor.

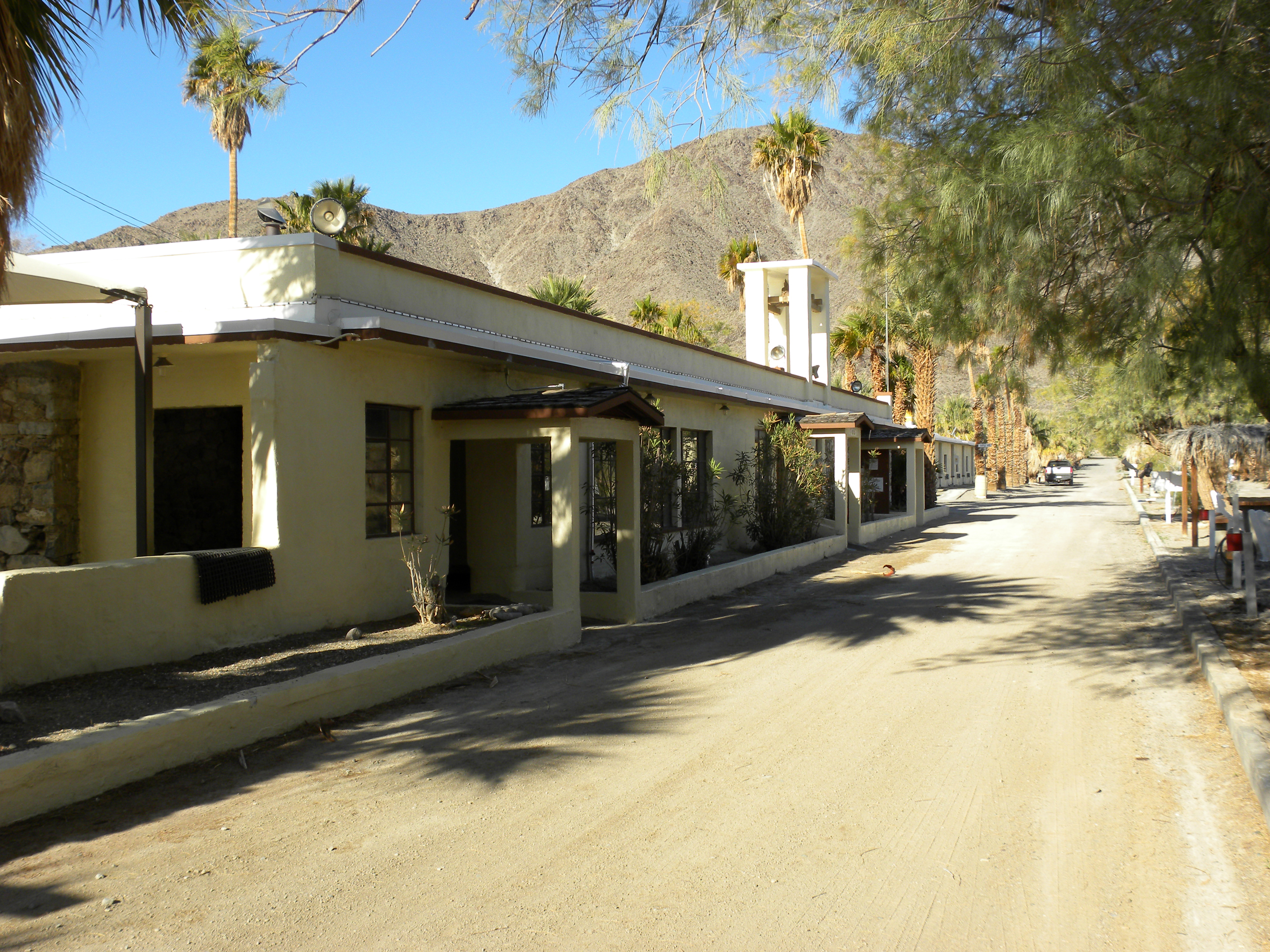
Administrative building and chapel built by Springer at Zzyzx, California. Now the Desert Studies Center headquarters.

From Zzyzx, Springer continued his syndicated radio program, at one point carried by 221 stations in the United States and 102 more abroad, mixing religious music and his own radio evangelism. Along with this came his requests that listeners send him "donations" to get his special cures for everything from hair loss to cancer. The potions were actually little more than a blend of celery, carrot and parsley juices. The Zzyzx Springs experience itself included goat milk; allegedly life-prolonging "Antedeluvian Tea"; a $25, self-administered hemorrhoid cure; more solicitations for "donations"; and a twice-daily sermon over the loudspeakers.

=== Legal challenges and imprisonment ===
By the late 1960s, Springer had begun marking off lots on the land and allowing "donors" of large sums of money to his ministry to build homes on the lots. This caught the attention of federal officials. While Springer had posted mining claims in the area, under the General Mining Law of 1872, it was still public land until such time that he validated the claims for patent by proving to federal government geologists that the claim contained minerals that could be extracted at a profit.

The federal government took Springer to court claiming he was squatting on federal land. In 1974, he was found guilty of the charge. He offered to pay $34,187 in back rent on the land to the Bureau of Land Management, but the government refused the payment and evicted him and his few hundred local followers. Springer was also convicted for making false claims that the health foods he sold would cure everything "from sore toes to cancer." He was represented in court by criminal attorney Gladys Towles Root. In the trial, Springer was convicted of false advertising. He filed several appeals on this conviction, and two years later ended up serving 49 days of a 60-day sentence.

Following the eviction, in 1976, the Bureau of Land Management allowed the California State University to manage the facilities and land in and around Zzyzx. A consortium of colleges combined funds and resources to convert the former resort into a research station called the Desert Studies Center; schools contributing to the center included California State Universities at Dominguez Hills, Fullerton, Los Angeles, Long Beach, Pomona and Northridge. After his release from prison, Springer and his wife relocated to Las Vegas, Nevada, where he spent the remainder of his life.

== Death ==
Curtis Springer died in Las Vegas on August 19, 1985, at the age of 88. He was buried in the Riverside National Cemetery in Riverside, California.
