= Borax Lake =

Borax Lake may refer to:

- Borax Lake (Oregon), a lake fed by geothermal springs
- Borax Lake Site, a lake and archaeological site in Lake County, California
- Borax Lake (San Bernardino County, California), a dry lake in San Bernardino County, California now known as Searles Lake
