= Desert Studies Center =

Field station of California State University

Coordinates: 35.1425°N 116.1045°W

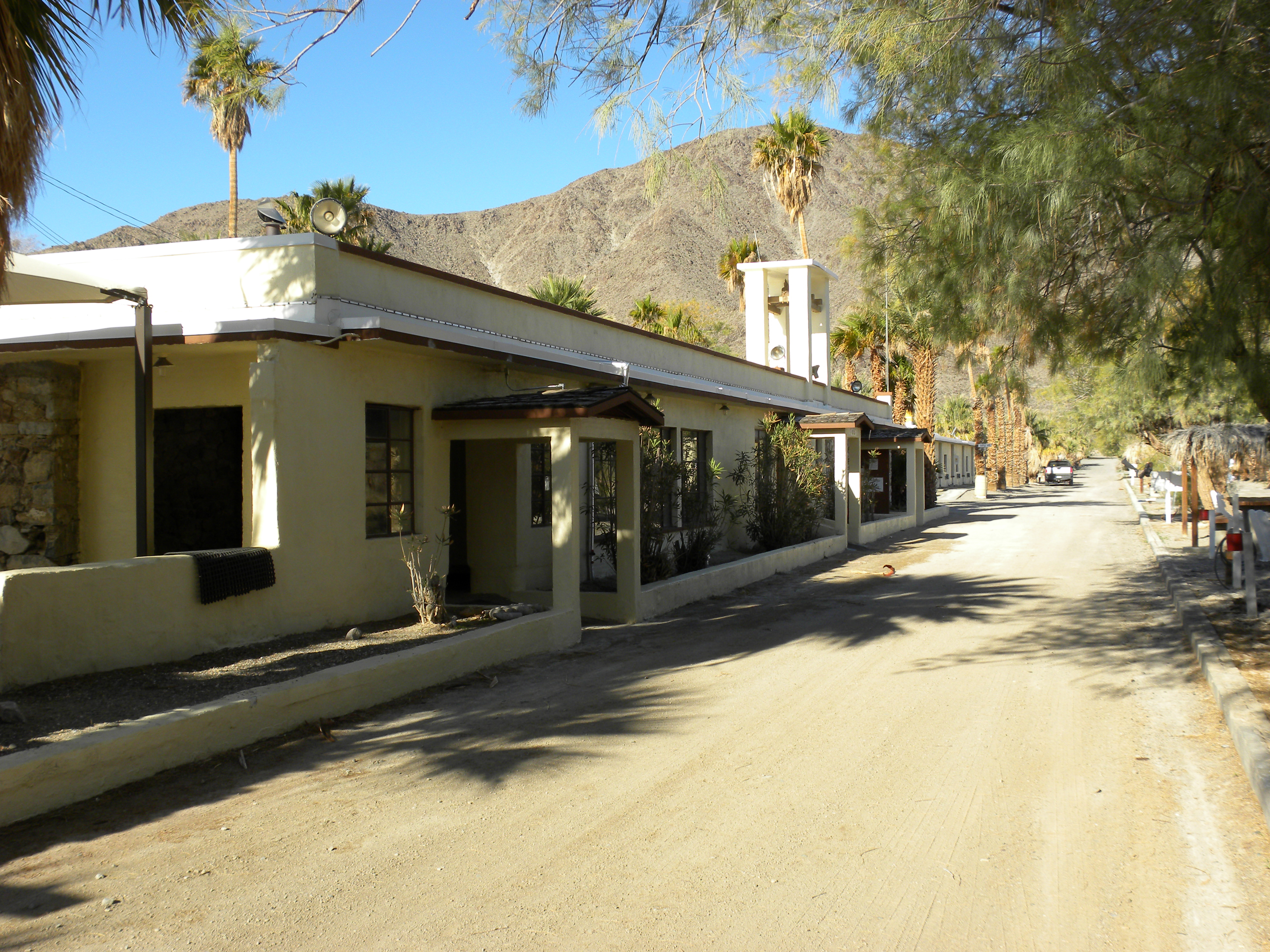
- Main building of the Desert Studies Center
- Other name: DSC
- Former names: Zzyzx Mineral Springs and Health Spa
- Type: Field station, research center
- Established: 1976
- Founders: California Desert Studies Consortium
- Parent institution: California State University
- Affiliation: California Desert Studies Consortium(seven California State University campuses)
- Religious affiliation: None
- Address: 49441 Zzyzx Rd, Baker, California, United States
- Campus: Remote desert field station, 1,280 acres
- Language: English
- Website: www.fullerton.edu/dsc/

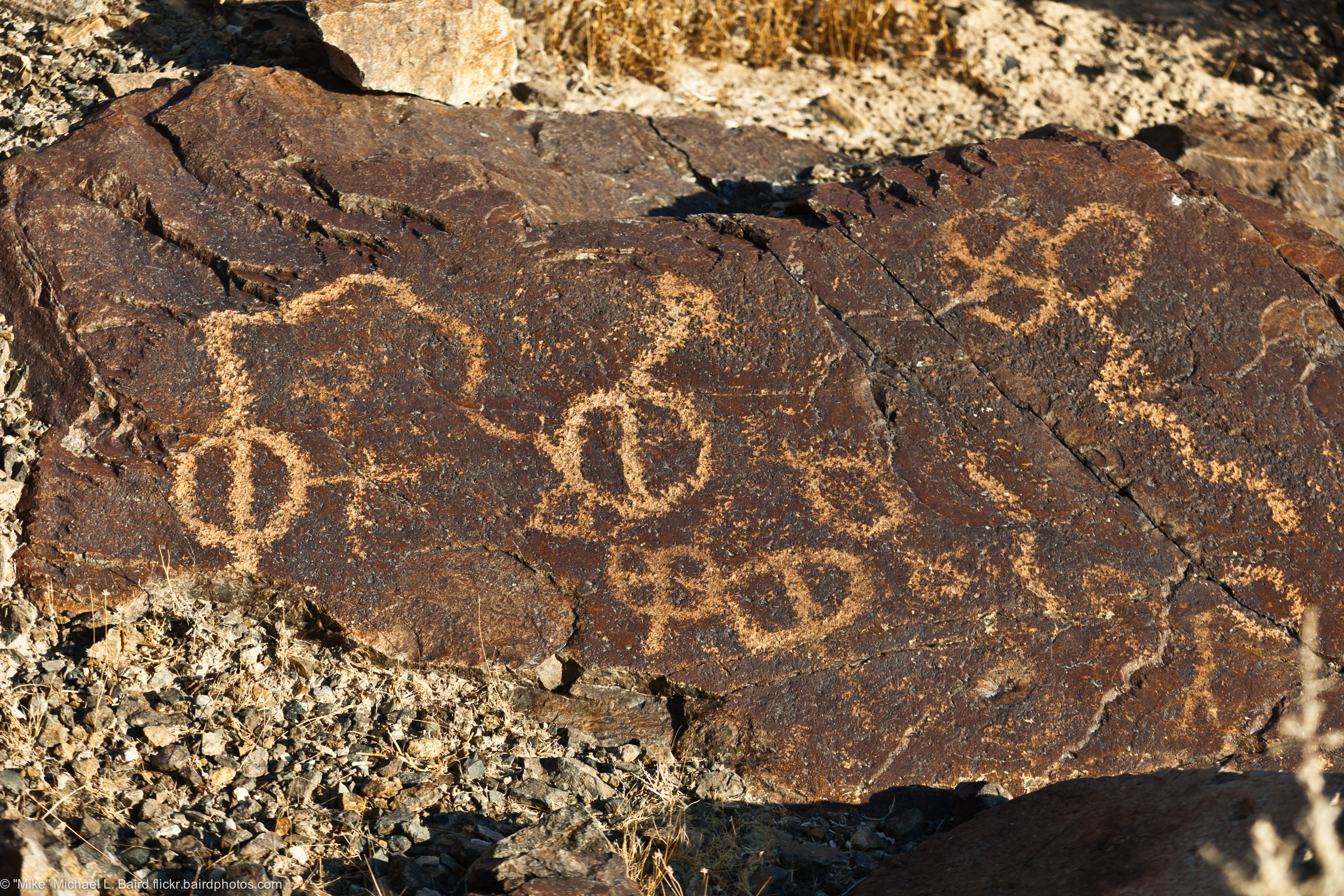
Petroglyph at the DSC

The Desert Studies Center (DSC) is a field station of the California State University (CSU) system, located in Zzyzx, California, United States in the Mojave Desert. The purpose of the center is to provide opportunities to conduct research, receive instruction and experience the Mojave Desert environment. It is officially operated by the California Desert Studies Consortium, a consortium of seven CSU campuses: Dominguez Hills, Fullerton, Long Beach, Los Angeles, Northridge, San Bernardino and Cal Poly Pomona.

Before the center, the site was the Zzyzx Mineral Springs and Health Spa, run by Curtis Howe Springer from 1944 to 1974, without federal permission. After Springer was ejected, the CSU system negotiated usage of the abandoned buildings of the health spa with the Bureau of Land Management, and in 1976, they signed a five-year cooperative management study for the Desert Studies Consortium to manage 1,280 acres (520 ha) at Soda Springs. The California Desert Protection Act of 1994 established Mojave National Preserve, and established the Desert Studies Center as a partnership between the National Park Service and the CSU system in perpetuity.

The location is especially interesting to biologists because of its perennial wetlands that attract many species of animals and plants in the area, including the threatened and endangered Saratoga Springs pupfish, the Mohave tui chub, and over 200 species of birds.

A few of California State University, Fullerton's biology courses require students visit the center for a mandatory field trip to pass those courses.

== See also ==
- Lake Tuendae
