= Valley fault system =

Valley fault system is the common name for fault systems in valleys and basins including:

- Marikina Valley fault system
- Independence Valley fault system
- Wabash Valley fault system
