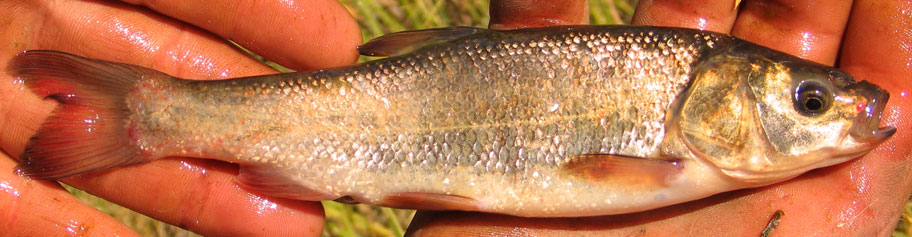

Conservation status
- Least Concern (IUCN 3.1)

Scientific classification
- Kingdom: Animalia
- Phylum: Chordata
- Class: Actinopterygii
- Division: Teleostei
- Order: Cypriniformes
- Family: Leuciscidae
- Subfamily: Laviniinae
- Genus: Siphateles
- Species: S. bicolor

Binomial name
- Siphateles bicolor (Girard, 1856)

Synonyms
- Algansea bicolor Girard, 1856; Gila bicolor (Girard, 1856); Algansea formosa Girard, 1856; Algansea obesa Girard, 1856; Algansea antica Cope, 1865; Siphateles vittatus Cope, 1883; Leucus dimidiatus Cope, 1883; Leucus olivaceus Cope, 1883; Myloleucus thalassinus Cope, 1883; Rutilus columbianus Snyder, 1908; Siphateles columbianus (Snyder, 1908); Rutilus oregonensis Snyder, 1908

= Tui chub =

Species of fish

The Tui chub (Siphateles bicolor) is a species of freshwater ray-finned fish belonging to the family Leuciscidae, which includes the daces, chubs, Eurasian minnows and related fishes. This fish is native to western North America. Widespread in many areas, it is a highly adaptable fish that has historically been a staple food source for native peoples.

The Tui chub has been referred to as both Siphateles bicolor and Gila bicolor in scientific literature; the same is true of several subspecies, such as the Owens Tui Chub (Siphateles bicolor snyderi) also being referred to as Gila bicolor snyderi. Despite the differing names, in this context, both scientific names are referring to the same species and subspecies based on some papers explicitly indicating these names are equivalent.

== Description ==
The form and appearance of the Tui chub is variable; many were originally described as different species by J. O. Snyder, but have since been reduced to subspecies. Their body shape comes in two forms: either more slender or more plump. In general, mature individuals are characterized by a deep olive above and white below, with a smooth variation in shading along the sides, and a brassy reflection. The fish has broad scales and a relatively large head compared to body. Fins are olive and sometimes tinted with red. The pectoral fins are far forward and low on the body. Length has been recorded at up to 45 centimeters (18 inches); however, 20–25 cm is typical for an adult. They do not display sexual dimorphism, indicating that the females and males look the same.

== Range and Distribution ==
During the Pleistocene, Tui chub lived in the Great Basin's large pluvial lakes. As time passed, these lakes diminished, and different populations became isolated. The Tui Chub's modern range includes the Lahonta Rneservoir) and Central system of the Great Basin, as well as the Owens, Truckee, Carson, Quinn, Humboldt, Columbia Klamath, and Mojave Rivers. It is also found in the Pit River and Goose Lake of the upper Central Valley, California. They can have a strong presence where they are found such as in Pyramid Lake where they are the most abundant species of fish present.

They have historically been abundant enough in the western Great Basin to provide a valuable food source to native peoples living there.

The range of the Tui chub has been controversial in the past with it being debated where exactly this species is native to. There is strong evidence indicating the species is native to Nevada and southern Oregon. It was once thought to be native to Idaho, but that is no longer considered accurate. Data obtained through natural history and the discovery of Tui chub bones in the Columbia River Basin in Washington provides evidence that the Tui chub is also native to the Columbia River Basin region.

== Habitat and behavior ==
Tui chubs are found in a variety of habitats, including small, fast-flowing streams, meandering rivers, springs, ponds, and lakes. Their adaptability allows them to live in both high cold lakes, such as Lake Tahoe, and warmer desert streams. Their optimal range for water temperature lies between 15 and 30 °C but they can survive in 2 to 36 °C conditions. Although they are suited for wide range of environments, they are typically found in slow water with abundant vegetation.

In lake habitats such as Walker Lake, Tui chub are heavily preyed upon. They are a key prey item for the Lahontan Cutthroat trout in Walker Lake. Additionally, Tui chub are preyed upon by fish-eating birds.

Tui chub diet is varied; young fish eat mostly invertebrates, adding plant material and especially algae as they mature. Young fish almost immediately begin feeding. Diet also varies by location and available food sources. For example, in some regions zooplankton are a fundamental and essential food item for maturing Tui chub. These fish can be categorized as opportunistic omnivores in their feeding habits. While zooplankton is essential in juveniles, some subspecies of Tui chub may differ in diet as adults. For example, Siphateles bicolor obesa relies more on eating aquatic macroinvertebrates as they mature compared to the Siphateles bicolor pectinifer which becomes an obligate planktivore in adulthood. Both subspecies mentioned can be found in the same lakes, yet their feeding habits differ. Eating habits can be determined by the fineness of the gill rakers. Fine-rakered forms in Pyramid Lake feed more on plankton in open water, while coarse-rakered forms, which live near the bottom eat more plants and algae. The largest individuals will eat other fish also. There is evidence of benthic feeding in Tui chub.

== Life cycle ==
Spawning may occur between late April and early August, depending on water temperature. In Pyramid Lake the peak season is June; males move inshore first, then congregate around arriving females in shallow water, preferring areas with a sandy substrate and heavy vegetation. The female scatters her eggs randomly over a wide area, where they are then fertilized by several males. In some populations, a chub's first spawning has been reported to occur in the spring of the fish's third year. During spawning, the Tui chub's coloration will intensify in both males and females. Eggs hatch between three and six days after fertilization; however, the embryos do not mature uniformly, leading to multiple spawning periods. The hatchlings feed in a pelagic state and grow rapidly in their first summer, attaining lengths of 22 to 42mm. In the subsequent summers they gain 20 to 55mm until they reach a mature adult size of 20 to 40 cm. Females reach sexual maturity at two years old while males reach it at one. Tui chubs are considered old once they surpass seven years and the oldest ever recorded was 33. In lake habitats, it is common for Tui chub to live between five and six years with fish aged greater than six being more rare.

== Culture ==
Archeological evidence reveals that the Tui chub was an important food source for the native people of the Western Great Basin, namely the Northern Paiute. Dip and gill nets were the preferred methods for harvesting fish; however, baited trotlines, basket traps, and weirs were often used for small-scale fishing. Ethnographic reports indicate that the Northern Paiute fished on a large scale with gill nets. They used tule floats, willow sticks, and stone weights to suspend the unattended nets in shallow water for up to a few days. Tui chub were a staple in the indigenous diet because they are abundant and available year-round, especially from April to August. During this 5-month period, the natives were provided with an almost inexhaustible stock. Fresh, small fish were swallowed whole while large fish were filleted. The remaining fish were dried and stored for later consumption. After examining bone fragments from several caches of fish, researchers determined that the natives had a preference for small chub. Many speculate that this arose from the desire to acquire calories efficiently. At larger sizes, the bone structure of the Tui Chub makes it difficult to separate edible portions. However, at small sizes, the bones are small enough to be ingested. Through careful observation of the Tui chub's behavior and environment, the tribes of the Western Great Basin were able to capitalize on this vital food source.

== Subspecies ==
As the pluvial lakes of the Pleistocene diminished over time, Tui chub populations became more isolated. This isolation ultimately led to the formation of many subspecies of Tui chub.

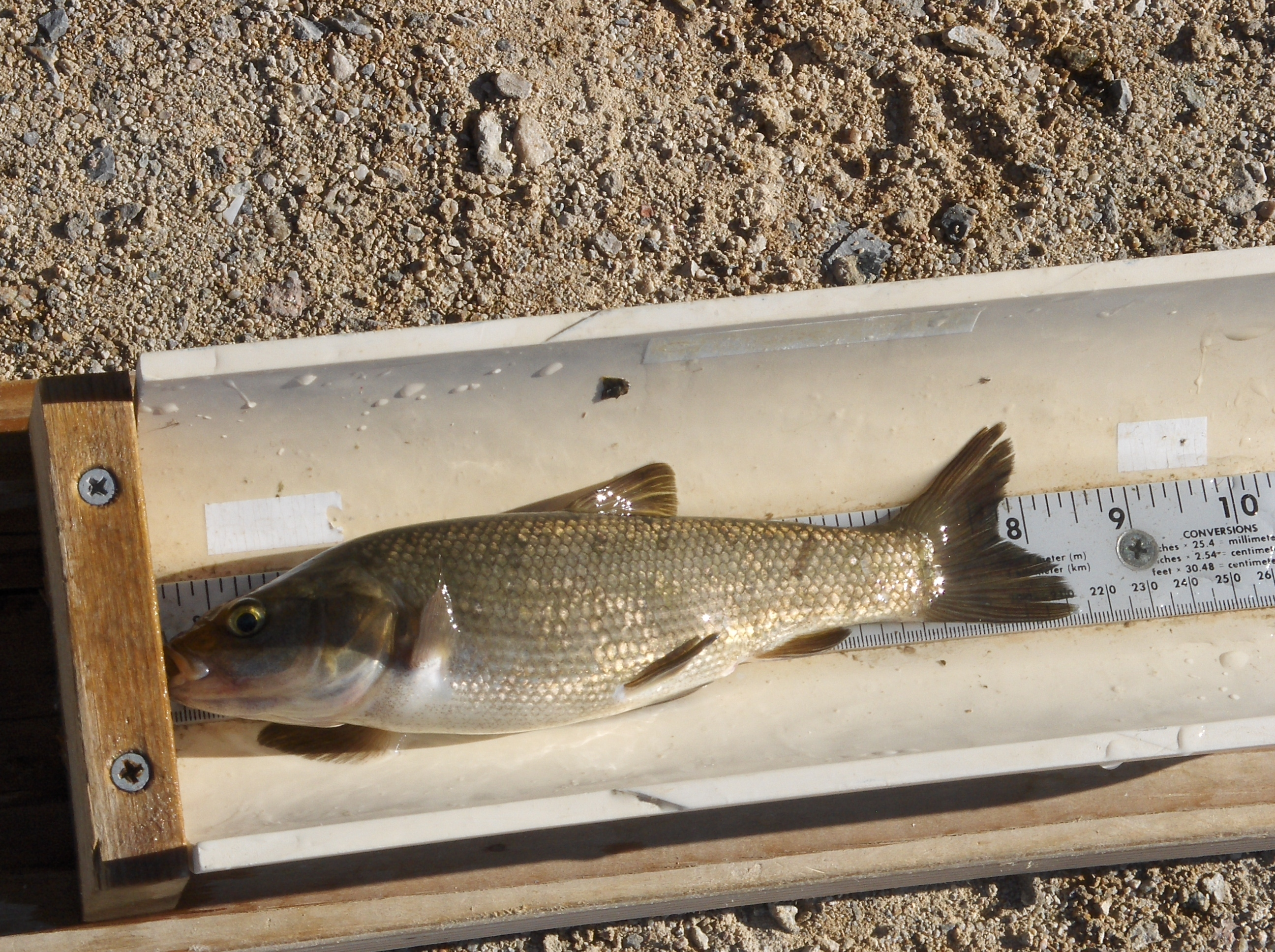
An example of a Tui chub subspecies, the Mohave Tui chub

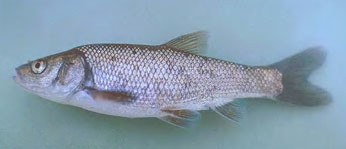
An example of a Tui chub subspecies, the Owens Tui chub

The exact number of subspecies is not known; Sigler & Sigler estimate as high as 16. It has been claimed by some that almost all Nevada, Oregon, and California isolated drainages contain a distinct subspecies of Tui chub. Agreed subspecies include:

- Siphateles bicolor bicolor
- Siphateles bicolor isolata
- Siphateles bicolor mohavensis
- Siphateles bicolor obesa
- Siphateles bicolor pectinifer
- Siphateles bicolor snyderi

There are various ways in which these many subspecies differ. To tell apart, for example, Siphateles bicolor obesa from Siphateles bicolor pectinifer, one can count the number of gill rakers; this distinguishing factor is more obvious for fish greater than 25 mm in length and is especially clear in Tui chub greater than 50 mm in length. This factor indicates similarity in diets for young Tui chub of both subspecies. Additionally, these subspecies differ in that the Siphateles bicolor pectinifer adults' mouths are more oblique, and they have more concave head shapes.

== Conservation ==
In terms of conservation, the Tui chub is in a unique position due to the abundant subspecies mentioned above. The various subspecies may vary in their conservation status. For example, The High Rock Springs tui chub (Gila bicolor ssp) is now considered extinct. Other subspecies have had opposing conservation stories, having once been considered extinct but then re-classified; one such case is the Independence Valley Tui Chub.

The conservation status of some of the subspecies above is as follows as of 2008:

- Siphateles bicolor isolata – Endangered
- Siphateles bicolor mohavensis – Endangered
- Siphateles bicolor snyderi – Endangered

One major threat to some subspecies of Tui chub is other subspecies of Tui chub. Introgressive hybridization occurs when there is interbreeding between different species or subspecies; it is a major threat to some species of Tui chub due to it erasing the distinct genetic diversity between populations. A concrete example of this is found in the introgressive hybridization of the Owens Tui Chub (Siphateles bicolor snyderi) and the Lahontan Tui Chub (Siphateles bicolor obesa); breeding and the creation of hybrids with the Lahontan Tui Chub has led to the Owens Tui Chub being categorized as endangered. In these populations, there are intermediate body shapes that reflect this hybridization. The implications of this specific example for the Tui chub species at large indicate less variation for which divergent natural selection is able to act upon.

The subspecies the Mohave Tui chub (Siphateles bicolor mohavenis) also faces the threat of introgressive hybridization, in this case with the arroyo chub(Gila orcutti). This ultimately led to the Mohave Tui chub being eliminated from the Mohave River system. One additional challenge for this species is that relative to other desert living fish, it is not as able to tolerate high temperatures. Its thermal scope is 30 degrees Celsius. They are not able to function in a large thermal range; they are broadly more well-adapted for open water. Mohave Tui chub also are not able to osmoregulate as effectively as other species, leading to a narrow range of salinities it can realistically tolerate. These factors make this endangered subspecies more vulnerable to extinction.

Tui chub conservation is layered in that not only due its many subspecies they have extreme variety in their conservation statuses and stories but also in that Tui chub have also historically been invasive. In Diamond Lake, Oregon, Tui chub's presence led to a significant decline in water quality and negatively impacted trout populations. Their impact on trout is that they have a significant overlap in diet, leading to competition between the two species. Once Tui chub were no longer in Diamond Lake, water quality improved drastically.
