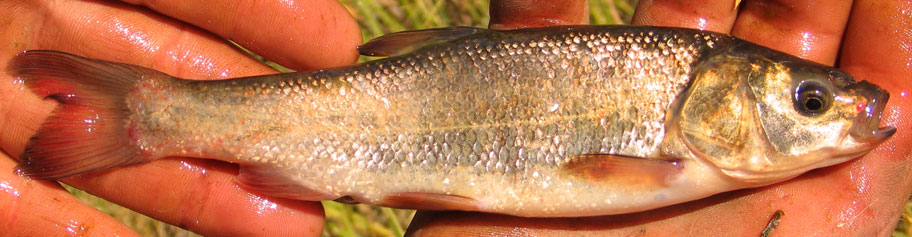
- Tui chub (Siphateles bicolor)

Scientific classification
- Kingdom: Animalia
- Phylum: Chordata
- Class: Actinopterygii
- Order: Cypriniformes
- Family: Leuciscidae
- Subfamily: Laviniinae
- Genus: Siphateles; Cope, 1883

Type species
- Siphateles vittatus Cope, 1883

Species
- 3, see text

Synonyms
- Leucidius Snyder, 1917

= Siphateles =

Siphateles Temporal range: Middle Pliocene to present

Genus of fishes

Siphateles is a genus of fish belonging to the family Leuciscidae, native to the Western United States. They were formerly placed in the genus Gila.

== Species ==
The species include:

- Siphateles alvordensis C. L. Hubbs & R. R. Miller, 1972 (Alvord chub)
- Siphateles bicolor (Girard, 1856) (Tui chub)
  - Siphateles bicolor bicolor (Girard, 1856) (Tui chub)
  - Siphateles bicolor isolata C. L. Hubbs & R. R. Miller, 1972 (Independence Valley tui chub)
  - Siphateles bicolor mohavensis (Snyder, 1918) (Mohave tui chub)
  - Siphateles bicolor obesa (Girard, 1856)
  - Siphateles bicolor pectinifer (Snyder, 1917)
  - Siphateles bicolor snyderi R. R. Miller, 1973 (Owens tui chub)
  - Siphateles bicolor vaccaceps F. T. Bills & C. E. Bond, 1980
- Siphateles boraxobius J. E. Williams & C. E. Bond, 1980 (Borax Lake chub)

A single fossil species, †Siphateles traini (Lugaski, 1979) has been described from complete specimens recovered from the middle Pliocene-aged Jersey Valley of Nevada.
