= Zzyzx, California =

Unincorporated community in California, United States

- Unincorporated community
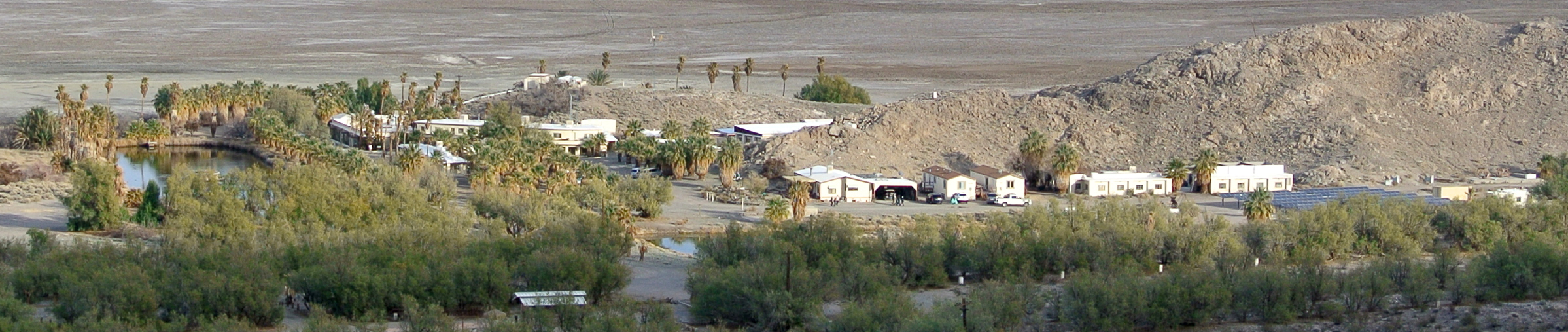
- Zzyzx, showing Lake Tuendae (left) and the Desert Studies Center

- Location within California Location within the United States
- Coordinates: 35°08′34″N 116°06′17″W
- Country: United States
- State: California
- County: San Bernardino
- Elevation: 951 ft (290 m)
- Time zone: UTC-8 (Pacific)
  - Summer (DST): UTC-7 (PDT)
- ZIP code: 92309
- Area codes: 442/760
- GNIS feature ID: 1662336

Zzyzx (/ˈzaɪzɪks/ ZY-ziks), formerly Soda Springs, is an unincorporated area in San Bernardino County, California, United States, within the boundaries of the Mojave National Preserve, managed by the National Park Service (NPS), an agency of the U.S. Department of Interior, as public land. It is the former site of the Zzyzx Mineral Springs and Health Spa, and now the site of the Desert Studies Center and is centered around the former right of way of the Tonopah and Tidewater Railroad. The site is also the location of Lake Tuendae, originally part of the spa, and now a refuge habitat of the endangered Mohave tui chub.

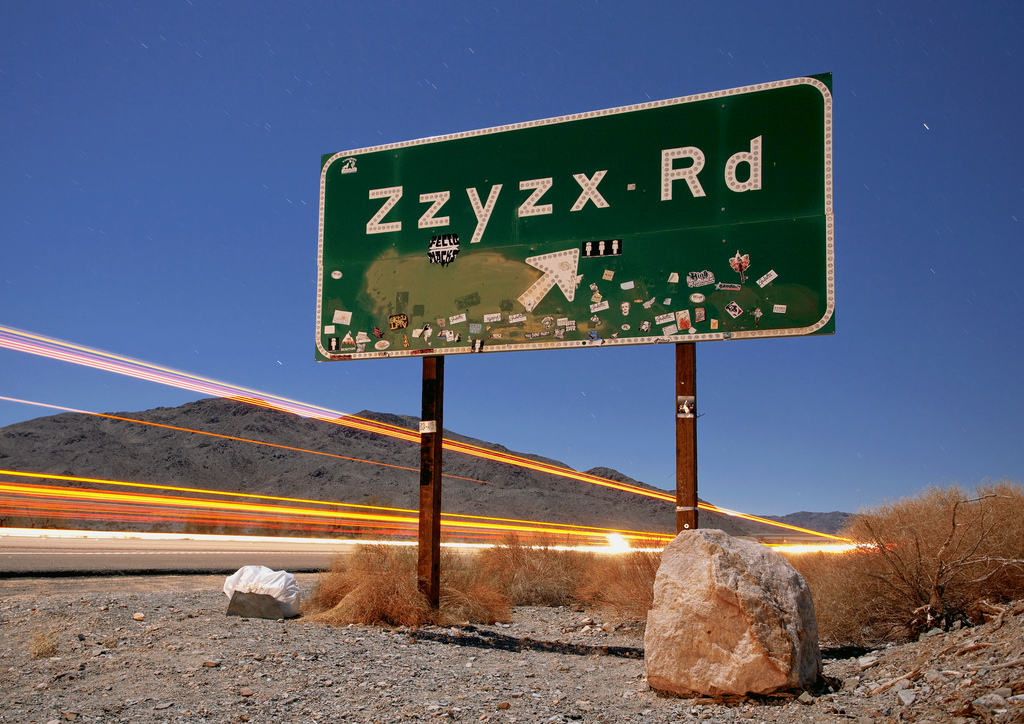
Interstate 15 exit sign for Zzyzx Road

Zzyzx Road is a 4.5-mile-long (7.2 km), part paved and part dirt, rural collector road in the Mojave Desert. It runs from Interstate 15 generally south to the Zzyzx settlement.

The nearest populated area is the small town of Baker, 7 miles (11 km) north on Interstate 15. Las Vegas is the nearest major city, approximately 100 miles (160 km) northeast.

== History ==
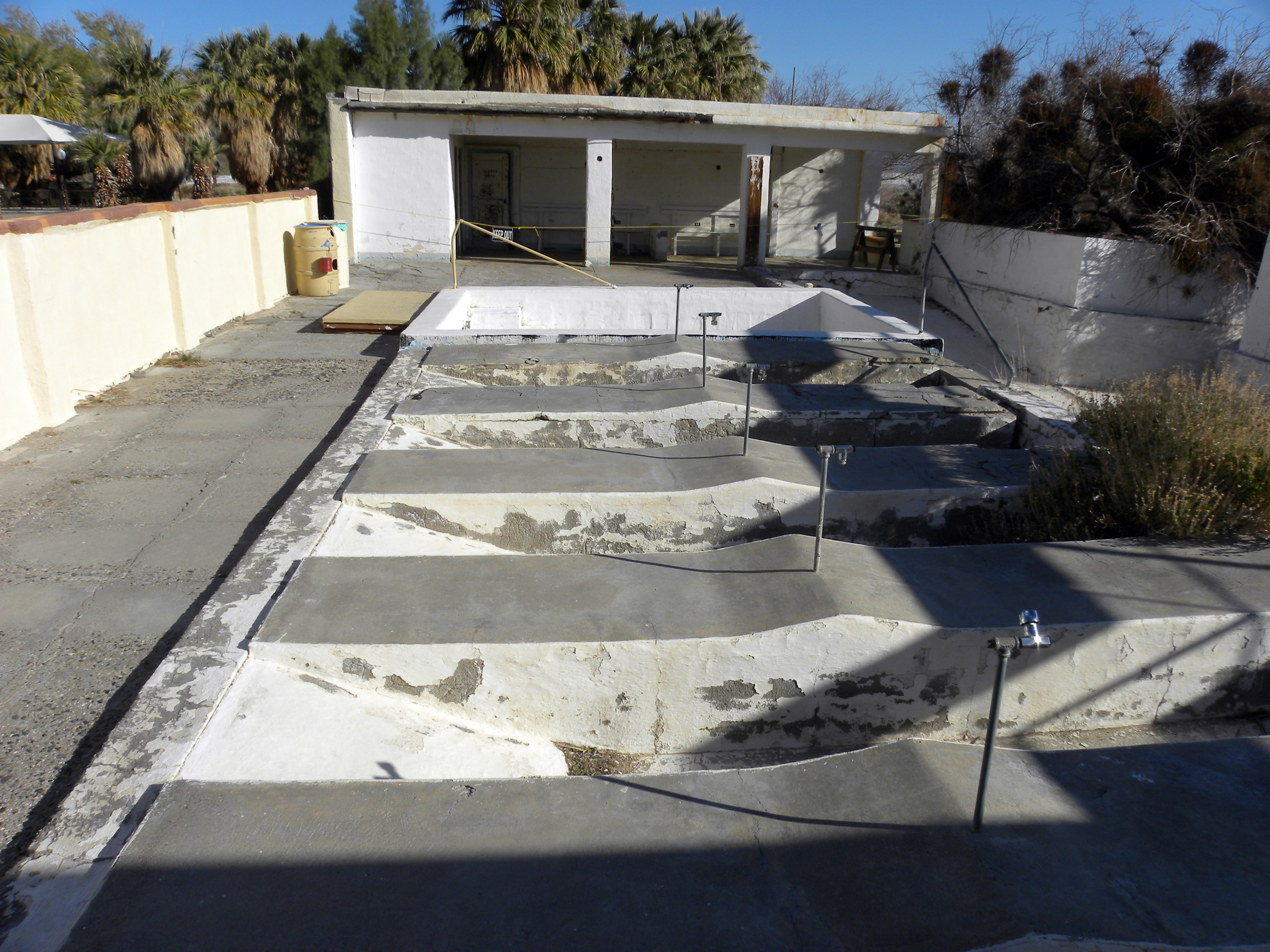
Old spas at Zzyzx

Curtis Howe Springer made up the name Zzyzx and gave it to the area in 1944, claiming it to be the last word in the English language. He established the Zzyzx Mineral Springs and Health Spa in 1944 at the spot, which was federal land, after filing mining claims for 12,000 acres (4,900 ha) surrounding the springs. He used the springs to bottle his water and provide drinks for travelers through the hot desert. Springer also imported animals from around the country to attract more families to visit his ranch. He used Zzyzx until 1974, when the government reclaimed the land.

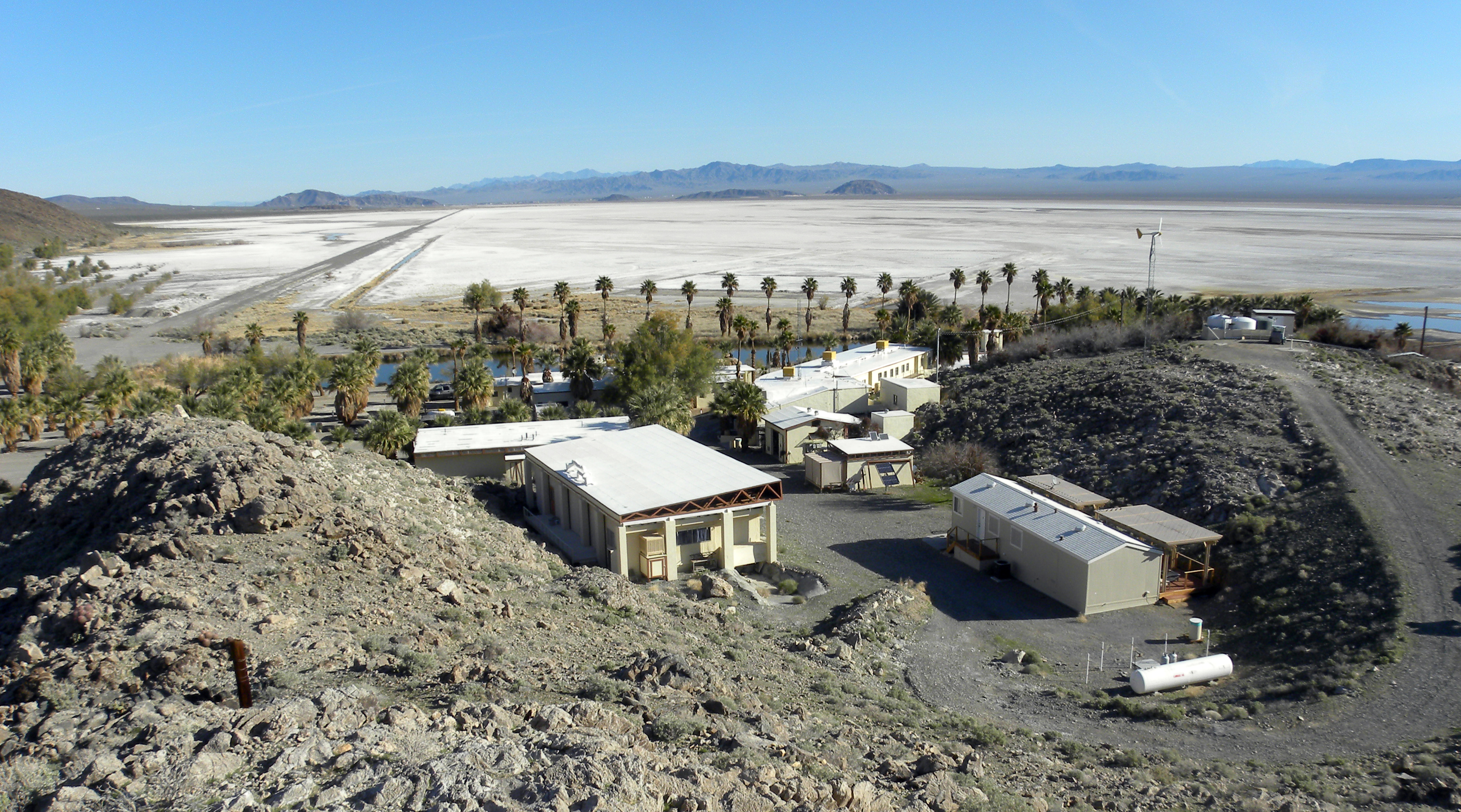
Desert Studies Center, 2010

In 1976, the Bureau of Land Management and the California State University agreed to cooperatively manage the land in and around Zzyzx and establish the CSU Desert Studies Center. In 1994, the United States Congress passed the California Desert Protection Act, establishing the Mojave National Preserve on former BLM land and further formalizing the partnership between the National Park Service and the California State University Desert Studies Center.

== Lexicography ==
The name appeared as "Zzyzx Springs" in Dmitri Borgmann's 1967 book Beyond Language. In 1977, Borgmann noted his source as being "an old, undated map of San Bernardino County published by the Automobile Club of Southern California" and repeated his description of the settlement as being "a hydrologic feature and privately owned spa in San Bernardino County, California, about 8.5 miles (13.7 km) south of Baker, on the western edge of Soda Dry Lake, off the abandoned right-of-way of the old Tonopah and Tidewater Railroad." After Borgmann's book, the 1973 Hammond Ambassador World Atlas began to show the place, labeling it as "Zzyzx" without the "Springs"; the 1976 Rand McNally Commercial Atlas and Marketing Guide followed suit.

Zzyzx as a settlement, and Zzyzx Spring as a water feature, were approved as a place name by the United States Board on Geographic Names on June 14, 1984. As is the case with the road, Zzyzx, California, is the USBGN's alphabetically last place name.

Zzyzx has frequently been noted on lists of unusual place names. Zzyzx was declared the "most difficult to pronounce" place name in California by Reader's Digest.

== In popular culture ==
The plot of Michael Connelly's 2004 Harry Bosch novel The Narrows revolves around a crime committed in Zzyzx. The novel was recreated in Season 2, Episode 2 of Bosch: Legacy.

The community was featured by Huell Howser in California's Golden Parks Episode 160.

The Internet TV show Smartypants S1 E7 (2024) produced by Dropout (formerly CollegeHumor) has a presentation by Carolyn Page about the history of the town.

== See also ==
- Zuzax, New Mexico – Unincorporated community in New Mexico, US
- Zyzyxia – Species of plant
- Zyzz, bodybuilder
