= Independence Valley tui chub =

Scientific classification
- Kingdom: Animalia
- Phylum: Chordata
- Class: Actinopterygii
- Order: Cypriniformes
- Family: Leuciscidae
- Genus: Siphateles
- Species: S. bicolor
- Subspecies: S. b. isolata

Trinomial name
- Siphateles bicolor isolata C. L. Hubbs & R. R. Miller, 1972

Synonyms
- Gila bicolor isolata

Subspecies of fish

The Independence Valley tui chub (Siphateles isolata isolata) is a subspecies of tui chub endemic to the drainage of the Independence Valley in Elko County, northern Nevada.

Described as "abundant" when first collected and identified in 1965, it was considered extinct within less than a decade due to the introduction of sunfish, bass, and carp to the previously isolated watershed. However, it had been rediscovered by the year 2000, although it remains highly threatened.
