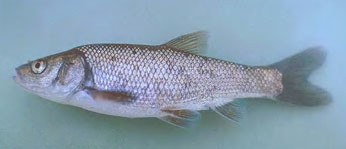

Conservation status
- Endangered (ESA)

Scientific classification
- Kingdom: Animalia
- Phylum: Chordata
- Class: Actinopterygii
- Order: Cypriniformes
- Family: Leuciscidae
- Genus: Siphateles
- Species: S. bicolor
- Subspecies: S. b. snyderi

Trinomial name
- Siphateles bicolor snyderi (R. R. Miller, 1973)

Synonyms
- Gila bicolor snyderi

= Owens tui chub =

Subspecies of fish

The Owens tui chub (Siphateles snyderi) was described in 1973 as a subspecies of tui chub endemic to the Owens River Basin in Eastern California, United States. The Owens tui chub is distinguished from its closest relative, the Lahontan tui chub, by scales with a weakly developed or absent basal shield, 13 to 29 lateral and apical radii, also by the structure of its pharyngeal arches, the number of anal fin rays, 10 to 14 gill rakers, and 52 to 58 lateral line scales. Dorsal and lateral coloration varies from bronze to dusky green, grading to silver or white on the belly. It may reach a total length of 30 centimetres (12 in). Owens tui chub are believed to be derived from Lahontan Basin tui chub that entered the Owens Basin from the north during the Pleistocene Epoch.

Owens tui chub were historically common and occupied all valley-floor wetlands near the Owens River in Inyo and Mono counties. Owens suckers, Owens speckled dace, and Owens pupfish have a similar distribution to the Owens tui chub. Analysis of microsatellite DNA shows that Owens tui chub in tributaries of Mono Lake and the Owens River are now hybridized with Lahontan tui chub. Genetically pure Owens tui chub occur in water that is cut off from the Owens River, such as at Sotcher Lake near Reds Meadow; springs near the Hot Creek Fish Hatchery in Mammoth Lakes, California; and artificial ponds at the White Mountain Research Center and at Mule Spring in Inyo County.

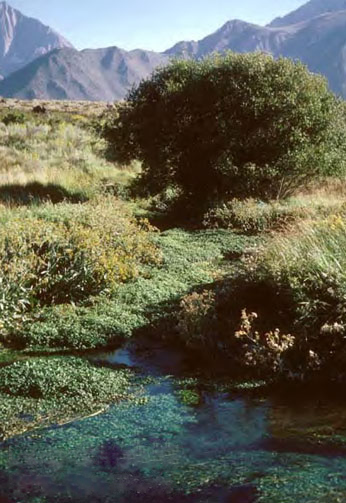
Typical habitat of the Owens tui chub

Owens tui chubs prefer pool habitats with low current velocities and dense aquatic vegetation that provide adequate cover and habitat for insect food items. Owens tui chubs feed mainly by gleaning and grazing among submerged vegetation. Its diet varies seasonally; the dominant items in its diet are chironomid larvae and algae in spring, chironomid larvae in summer, hydroptilid caddisflies in fall, and chironomid larvae in winter. Spawning occurs from late winter to early summer at spring habitats, with spawning likely triggered by day length. In riverine and lacustrine or lake-like habitats where water temperatures fluctuate seasonally, the Owens tui chub spawns in spring and early summer, with spawning triggered by warming water temperatures. Females may produce more than 10,000 eggs. Tui chubs may reach sexual maturity at 2 years, and may live more than 30 years.
