= Alvord chub =

Conservation status
- Near Threatened (IUCN 3.1)

Scientific classification
- Kingdom: Animalia
- Phylum: Chordata
- Class: Actinopterygii
- Order: Cypriniformes
- Family: Leuciscidae
- Subfamily: Laviniinae
- Genus: Siphateles
- Species: S. alvordensis

Binomial name
- Siphateles alvordensis (C. L. Hubbs & R. R. Miller, 1972)

Synonyms
- Gila alvordensis Hubbs & Miller, 1972

Species of fish

The Alvord chub (Siphateles alvordensis) is a species of freshwater ray-finned fish belonging to the family Leuciscidae, which includes the daces, chubs, Eurasian minnows and related fishes. This is a rare species which is endemic to the Alvord basin in southeastern Oregon and northwestern Nevada, U.S., known only from a few springs, streams and marshes in the Sheldon National Wildlife Refuge, and one location elsewhere.

The Alvord chub is a small fish, with adults ranging up to 5.5 inches (14 cm) in length, but with many half that size. It is generally grayish-whitish, darker on the back than below, and with a faint band passing down the sides. The dorsal fin has 7 rays, the anal fin 8 rays, and the tail 19 rays. It is similar in many ways to the Borax Lake chub.

Studies of the fish's diet shows it is an opportunistic feeder, consuming a variety of aquatic invertebrates, with a considerable percentage of midge larvae. It occupies a variety of habitats within its range, including waters of depths 3 inches (7.6 cm) to 3 feet (91 cm), different bottoms including gravel and silt, and any amount of cover over the water. It can be found in warm springs, up to 80 °F (27 °C), but not in hot springs.

Spawning season lasts from April to July.

Although apparently doing well in its location, the species is considered vulnerable because of its very limited range in a fragile environment. Having evolved without any competition, there is concern over the possible effects of exotic fish introduction, whether deliberate or accidental.
