= Borax Lake chub =

Conservation status
- Vulnerable (IUCN 3.1)

- Critically Imperiled (NatureServe)

Scientific classification
- Kingdom: Animalia
- Phylum: Chordata
- Class: Actinopterygii
- Order: Cypriniformes
- Family: Leuciscidae
- Subfamily: Laviniinae
- Genus: Siphateles
- Species: S. boraxobius

Binomial name
- Siphateles boraxobius (J. E. Williams & C. E. Bond, 1980)

Synonyms
- Gila boraxobius Williams & Bond, 1980

Species of fish

The Borax Lake chub (Epizon boraxobius) is a species of freshwater ray-finned fish belonging to the family Leuciscidae, which includes the daces, chubs, Eurasian minnows and related fishes. This is a rare species which is found only in outflows and pools around Borax Lake, a small lake of the Alvord basin, Harney County, Oregon.

This species typically reaches only 2.0 inches (5 cm) in length, although some are as long as 4.3 inches (11 cm). The back is generally a dark olive green, while the sides are silvery, with a dark line extending from gill cover to tail, and a scattering of dark melanophores. The fins are colorless, with more melanophores on the rays of the dorsal fin and tail, as well as on the first four rays of the pectoral fins. Similar in many ways to the Alvord chub, the Borax Lake species has a longer, wider, and deeper head, and larger eyes, and the caudal peduncle is more slender.

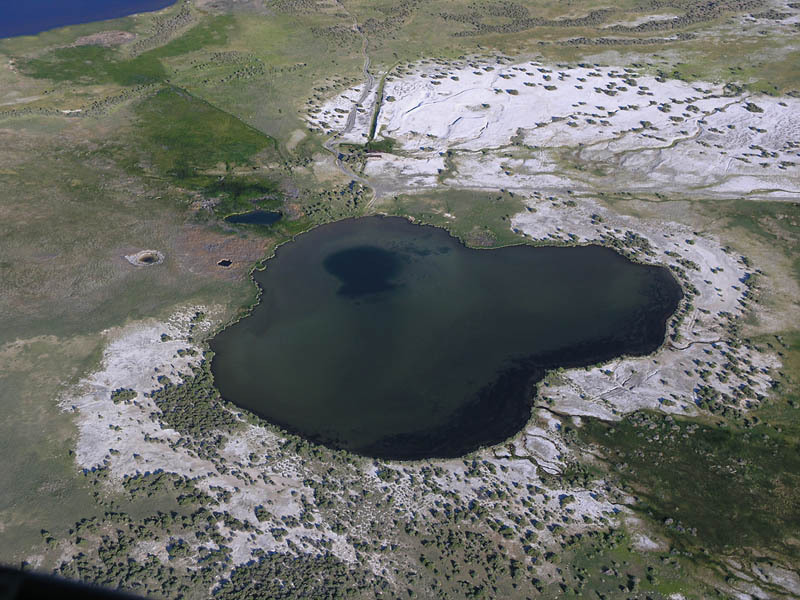
Aerial photo of Borax Lake in Eastern Oregon

The Borax Lake chub eats a variety of foods, including midge larvae, diatoms, copepods, ostracods, and terrestrial insects. Its preferred mode of feeding is to root around in the bottom, but it will go after floating material or feed from the surface if necessary.

This species is the sole fish inhabiting the Borax Lake waters. While parts of the lake itself can, at times, rise to about 100 °F (38 °C) fed from thermal springs, the average temperature ranges between 61–95 °F (16–35 °C). The fish avoid the warmest water, favoring lake's outflows. Its continued existence was threatened by geothermal energy development near the lake, which dried up part of the chub's habitat. However, in 2000 the Steens Mountain Cooperative Management and Protection Act put the area around the lake off-limits to geothermal exploration and mining.

It was listed as an endangered species by the U.S. Fish and Wildlife Department from 1980, when it was listed under an emergency rule that was made permanent in 1982, until July 2020, when it was delisted due to recovery. The Nature Conservancy had bought Borax Lake and surrounding land for conservation management in the interim.
