= Lake Tuendae =

Artificial pond at the Desert Studies Center in Zzyzx, California

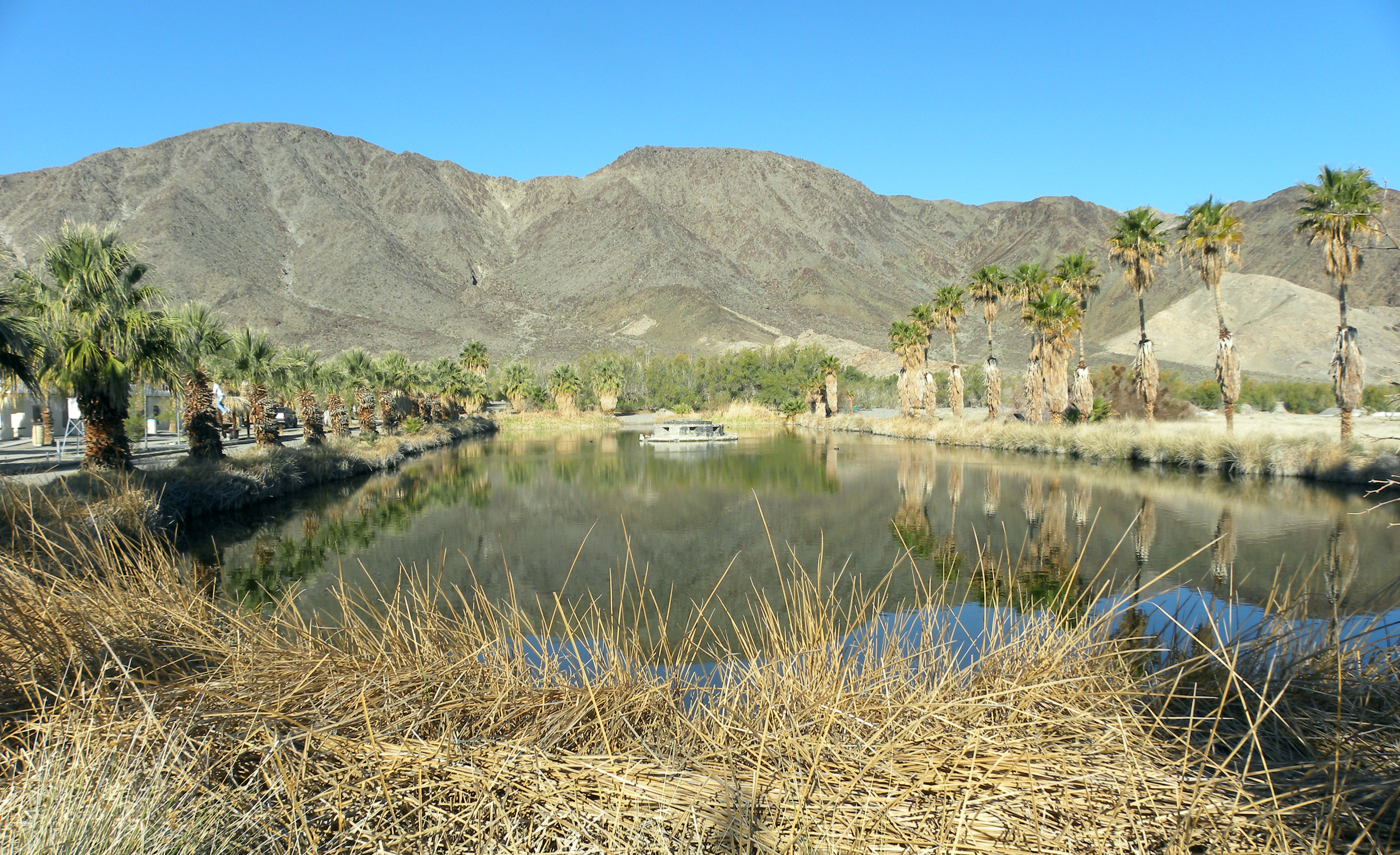

- Location within California Location within the United States
- Location: Zzyzx; San Bernardino County, California
- Coordinates: 35.1432°N 116.1040°W
- Type: Artificial pond
- Basin countries: United States
- Max. length: 140 m (460 ft)
- Max. width: 40 m (130 ft)
- Surface area: 5,600 m^{2} (60,000 sq ft)
- Shore length^{1}: 360 m (1,180 ft)
- Surface elevation: 289 m (948 ft)
- ^{1} Shore length is not a well-defined measure.

Lake Tuendae is an artificial pond at the Desert Studies Center in Zzyzx, California. It is inhabited by American Coots as well as the endangered Mohave tui chub.

== See also ==
- List of lakes in California
