= Independence Valley fault system =

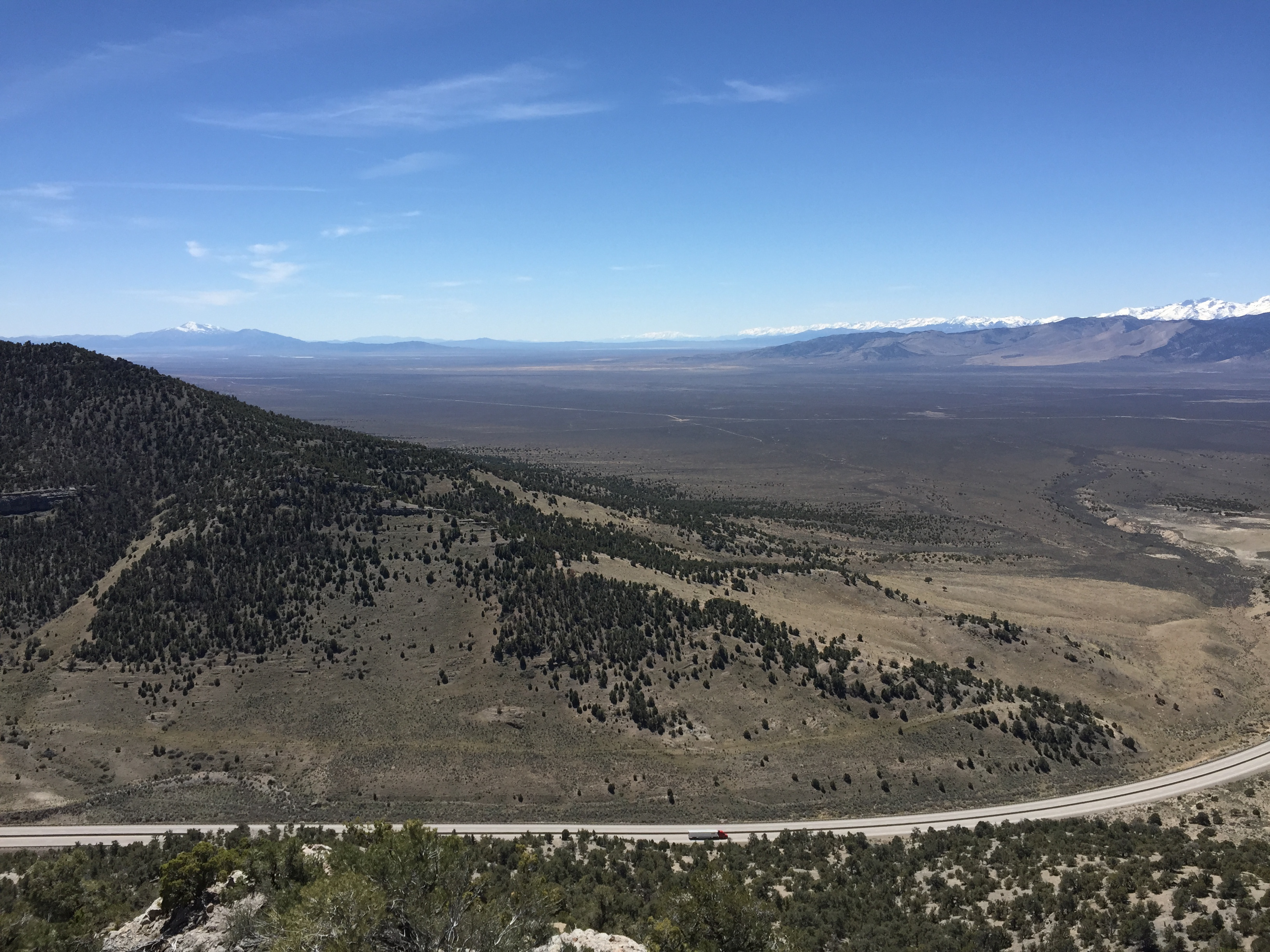
Independence Valley in northeastern Nevada

The Independence Valley fault system is a group of interrelated normal faults located in northeastern Nevada in the United States. The fault system is characteristic of faulting throughout the Great Basin region.

== See also ==
- Independence Valley tui chub
