= Borax Lake (Oregon) =

Alkaline lake in the US

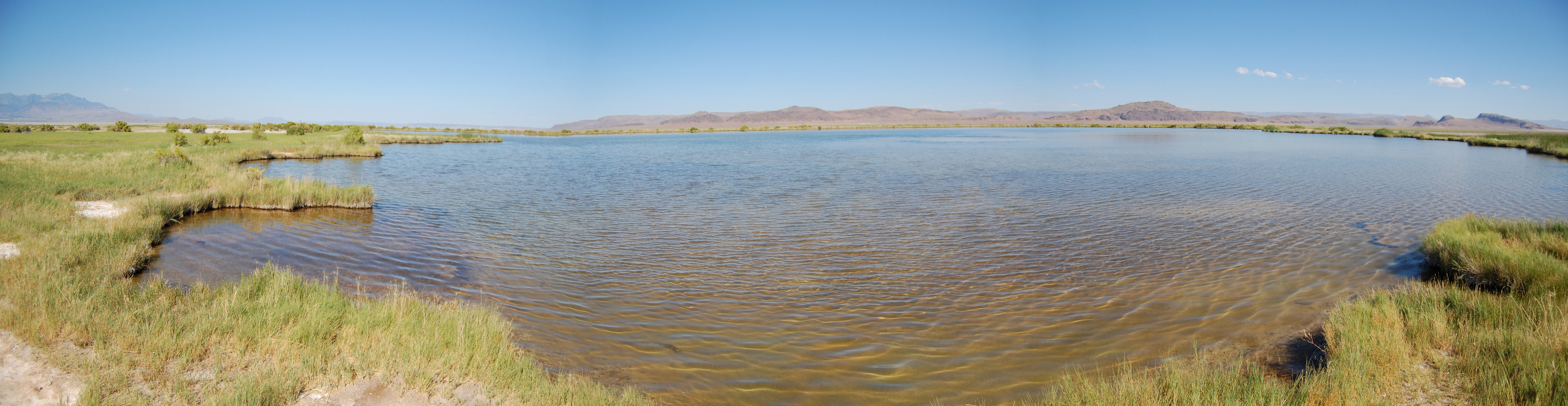
- Panorama: Borax Lake

- Location of Borax Lake in Oregon, USA. Borax Lake (the United States)
- Location: Harney County, Oregon
- Coordinates: 42°19′37″N 118°36′11″W
- Primary inflows: Geothermal springs
- Primary outflows: Ground seepage and evaporation
- Basin countries: United States
- Surface area: 10 acres (4.0 ha)
- Surface elevation: 4,078 feet (1,243 m)

Borax Lake is a 10-acre (4.0 ha) alkaline lake in the Alvord Desert of southeastern Oregon in the United States. The lake is fed by geothermal springs 100 feet (30 m) below the surface that range in temperature from 104 to 300 °F (40 to 149 °C). Surface water temperatures usually range from 61 to 100 °F (16 to 38 °C) but occasionally go higher. The springs lie along the Steens fault zone, which runs north–south through the Alvord Valley east of Steens Mountain.

Borax lake chub, Gila boraxobius

The lake contains high concentrations of borax (sodium borate), as well as arsenic and lead. Despite this, it is home to a unique species of fish, known as the Borax Lake chub. The species was formerly threatened by development of geothermal energy in the vicinity. However, in 1993 The Nature Conservancy bought 160 acres (65 ha) of private land, including the lake, in order to protect it; the U.S. Fish and Wildlife Service has designated 640 acres (260 ha) near the lake as critical habitat, and the Steens Mountain Cooperative Management and Protection Act of 2000 put the area around the lake off-limits to geothermal exploration and mining. After the population recovered, the U.S. Fish and Wildlife Service removed the Borax Lake chub from the federal endangered species list in July 2020. Federal officials planned to monitor the fish for 10 years after delisting. Oregon's Fish and Wildlife Commission removed it from the state threatened and endangered species list in February 2021. The lake and nearby wetlands and water bodies such as Alvord Lake, north of the small community of Fields, provide important bird habitat.

== History ==
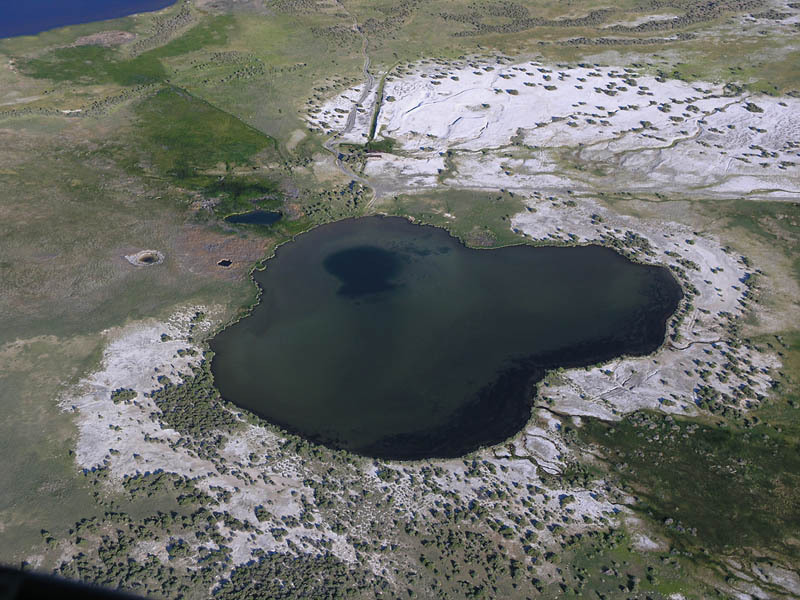
Aerial view of the lake

In the late 19th century, a mining company called Rose Valley Borax bought the springs and the land around it. The borax salts emanating from the springs had collected on the surface and formed a low dome 1 mile (1.6 km) across. The company mined the borax for about 10 years. Wagons pulled by mule teams delivered the borax to a railway terminal in Winnemucca, Nevada. Ruins of buildings associated with borax mining, which ended here in 1902, remain near the lake in the 21st century.

Interest in mining for boron and other substances in the Alvord Lake basin rose again in the 1940s and 1950s. A geologist who took samples from hot springs in and near Borax Lake (then also called Hot Lake) reported in 1960 on the prospects for resumed commercial mining in the area. He estimated the total accumulation of borates from Borax Lake and another nearby hot springs at about 150 short tons (140 t) a year.

== See also ==
- List of lakes in Oregon
