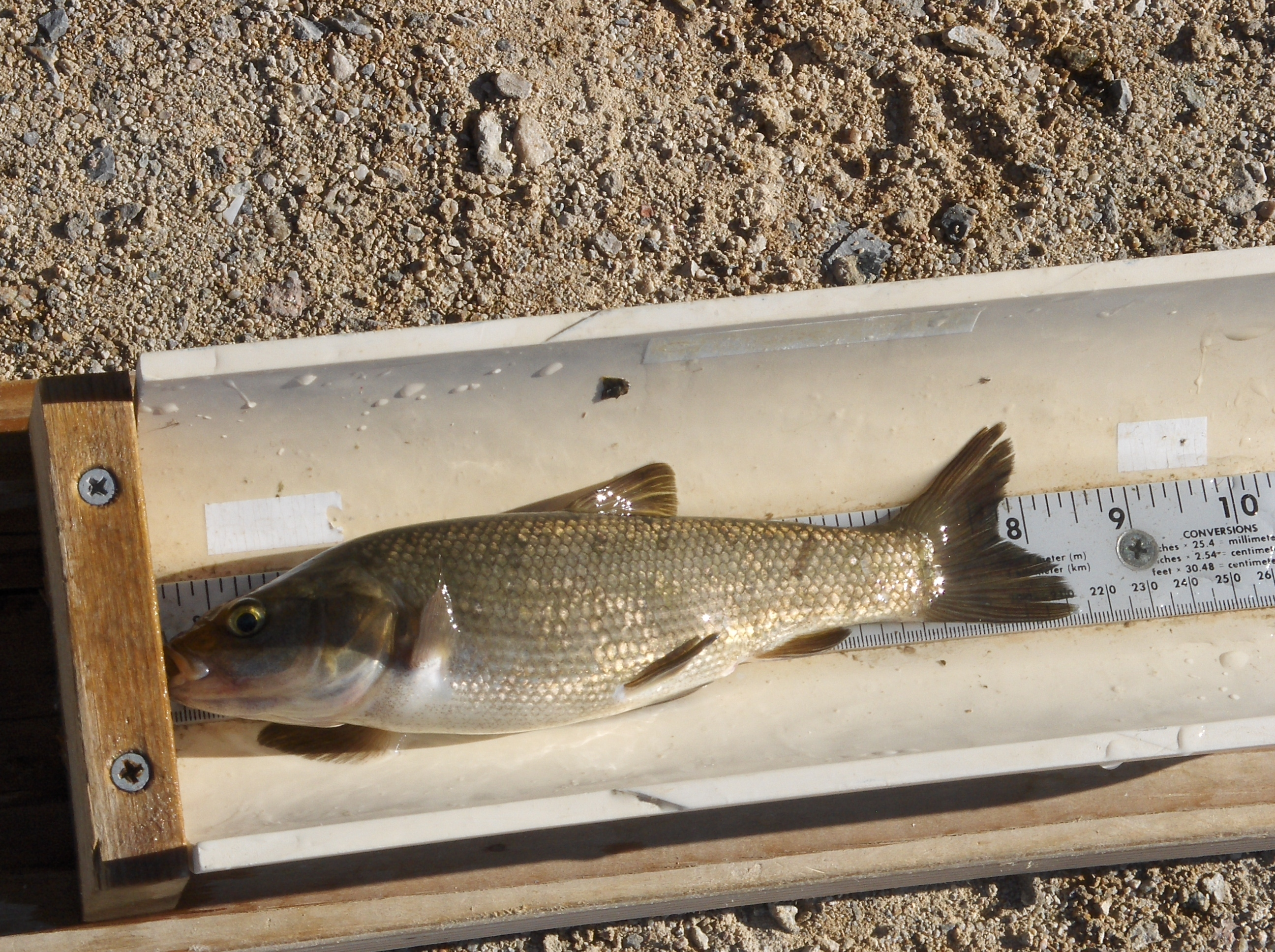

Conservation status
- Endangered (ESA)

Scientific classification
- Kingdom: Animalia
- Phylum: Chordata
- Class: Actinopterygii
- Division: Teleostei
- Order: Cypriniformes
- Family: Leuciscidae
- Genus: Siphateles
- Species: S. bicolor
- Subspecies: S. b. mohavensis

Trinomial name
- Siphateles bicolor mohavensis Snyder, 1918

Synonyms
- Gila bicolor mohavensis (Snyder, 1918)

= Mohave tui chub =

Subspecies of fish

The Mohave tui chub (Siphateles mohavensis) is a species of the tui chub endemic to the Mojave River.

The Mohave tui chub was listed as endangered under the Endangered Species Act in 1970, then added to California's list of endangered species in 1971. A recovery plan was created by the United States Fish and Wildlife Service in 1984.

== Description ==
Adult Mohave tui chubs' standard length ranges from 52 to 92 mm (2.0 to 3.6 in) However, some adults can reach 150 mm (5.9 in) or longer. They have a thick body and short, rounded fins. These fish have a brown to dark olive colored back and blueish white to silver belly. The species does not demonstrate sexual dimorphism.

Females spawn from February to October and lay between 4,000 and 50,000 eggs that stick to aquatic vegetation. Mohave tui chubs are adapted to survive the Mojave River's alkaline water, low oxygen levels, and high water temperatures. Adults are solitary and inhabit deeper waters. Mohave tui chubs subsist on insect larvae, small fish, and detritus.

== Conservation ==
Mohave tui chubs were found in two isolated ponds and one spring at Soda Springs: Lake Tuendae, Three Bats Pond, and MC Spring. Mohave tui chubs were thought to have gotten to Soda Springs either from the introduction in 1945 or during the intense flooding of 1938. Efforts to move the chubs were largely unsuccessful, with three successes out of fourteen attempts. The successes were at Lark Seep Lagoon, Desert Research Station Pond, and Barstow Way Station Pond. The Lark Seep Lagoon is on the China Lake Naval Weapons Center, to which tui chubs were introduced in 1971, where today the population still exists. The Desert Research Station Pond was stocked with 16 fish in 1978, but no longer exists today. 60 chubs were introduced to the Barstow Way Station Pond, but were not considered a population due to their containment in a small and artificial environment and no longer exists today.

The U.S. Fish and Wildlife Service created a Recovery Plan to delist the Mohave tui chub from the list of threatened and endangered wildlife in 1984. The authors decided that three additional habitats must be established, with minimum populations of 500, with their integrity maintained for five years total (the previous three habitats are included in this). The habitats must also be exposed to and have survived a flood before reclassification will commence. At re-evaluation in 2004, the recovery plans suggested in 1984 were not implemented. However, there is a transplanted population at Camp Cady that persists today. As of today, the recovery plan has still not commenced. The 1984 recovery plan was revisited in 2004 by the National Park Service. The group consisted of academics, the old recovery team, and government agencies to discuss Mohave tui chub recovery. The group discussed the possibility of reintroducing the Mohave tui chub into the Mojave River to delist it.

Laboratory spawning of this fish is important to consider as a possibility to recover this species' populations. Controlled spawning can also provide individuals for experiments to help this species as well. As of now, it appears that no active breeding attempts have been made or are underway.

=== Threats ===
The main reason for the Mohave tui chubs' decline was the introduction of Arroyo chubs. Arroyo chubs were introduced to the river in the 1930s by trout fishermen as bait fish, and their spread was aided by significant flooding in 1938. Following their introduction, there were significant numbers of Arroyo chubs, hybridized species, and far fewer Mohave tui chubs. By 1967, genetically pure Mohave tui chubs no longer existed in the Mojave River. Arroyo chubs are stream adapted minnows with higher tolerances for low oxygen and higher temperatures than Mohave tui chubs, thus it is possible that competitive displacement alone could have displaced the Mohave tui chub regardless of genetics. In addition to the introduction of Arroyo chubs, other exotic species introductions, such as bass, catfish, trout, bullfrog, and crayfish, hurt Mohave tui chub numbers through predation and competition. Habitat alterations such as the construction of reservoirs altered the natural flow regime and created habitats more suitable for invasive species that further plummeted Mohave tui chub populations.

An additional threat to the Mohave tui chub was the discovery of Asian tapeworm within the species in 2001 in Lake Tuendae, the same time western mosquitofish were found there as well. Native to China, this tapeworm spends a portion of its life cycle inside the intestine of freshwater fish. Its widespread introduction occurred with translocations of common carp and grass carp. The impacts of Asian tapeworms on wild fish populations need to be studied more, with various effects on differing fish species observed. Student Thomas Archdeacon designed an experiment to test the effects of Asian tapeworm on Mohave tui chubs in 2007. It was concluded that Asian tapeworm does not directly reduce Mohave tui chub survival and decreases growth slightly. Note that this is within a laboratory setting and Archdeacon notes that field research is necessary. Archdeacon studied the impacts of mosquitofish on Mohave tui chub in the laboratory setting as well. While more studies are needed, he concluded that eventually, the Mohave tui chub reaches a size that protects them from predation by mosquitofish. Additionally, mosquitofish may even provide a food source as they were found within the stomachs of Mohave tui chubs multiple times in the field.

=== Current populations ===
As of 2013, there were 3 populations: Soda Lakes (Lake Tuendae and Mohave Chub spring), China Lake, and Camp Cady. MC is a pond with a surface area of 250 square feet and consists of a single pool with no outlet. Counts from the time predicted numbers between 257 and 618 fish in the pool. The California Department of Fish and Wildlife backs up these claims, stating that Mohave tui chubs still exist today at Soda Springs, Camp Cady, and China Lake. The population is doing well at Camp Cady in two ponds, whereas the Soda Lake population is threatened by mosquitofish and Asian tapeworms. It is thought that the most secure population exists at China Lake.

The Mohave tui chub is still listed as endangered today. There do not appear to be any recent population evaluations on this fish. Chen et al. believe that the goal to reintroduce Mohave tui chub into the Mojave River is unattainable today. The authors state that the removal of Arroyo chub would be necessary, and the scale of the Mojave River is too large for such an endeavor and would cause too large an impact on sport fisheries and the availability of drinking water. However, they suggest that Mohave tui chub could be introduced into upstream tributaries, ponds, and impoundments. Doing so could provide experimental management zones.

== See also ==
- Lake Tuendae
- Zzyzx, California
