= Lake Jargö =

Lake of China

Jargö Lake
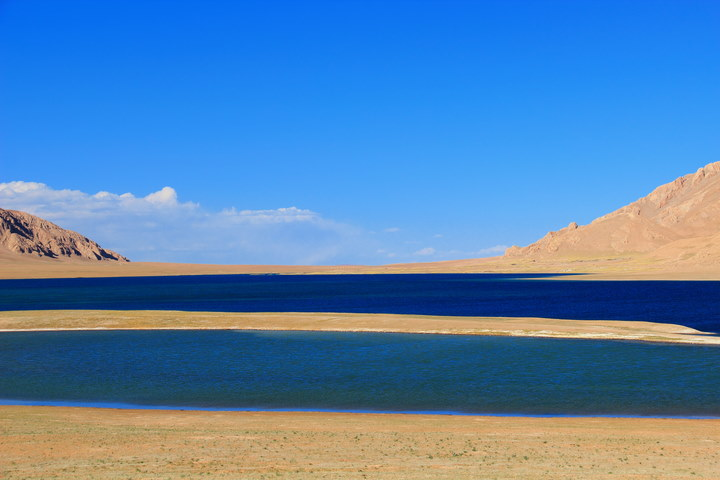

- Location within Tibet
- Coordinates: 31°49′N 88°14′E
- Type: Freshwater lake
- Catchment area: 14,714 km^{2} (5,700 sq mi)
- Basin countries: China
- Max. length: 27.2 km (17 mi)
- Max. width: 7.9 km (5 mi)
- Surface area: 88.5 km^{2} (0 sq mi)
- Surface elevation: 4,547 m (14,918 ft)

Jargö Lake (Tibetan: བྱ་རྒོད་མཚོ།, Wylie: bya rgod mtsho) or Qiagui Co (Chinese: 恰规错; pinyin: Qiàguī Cuò) is a plateau lake in Nagqu Prefecture, Tibet Autonomous Region, southwest of China, located between Nyima County and Xainza County. The lake, which is part of the Siling Lake drainage system, is primarily fed by a 1 km long river (from Lake Urru) and drains eastward into Siling Lake. It is 27.2 km long and 7.9 km wide and has an area of 88.5 square km.
