= Dazecuo =

Dagze Lake
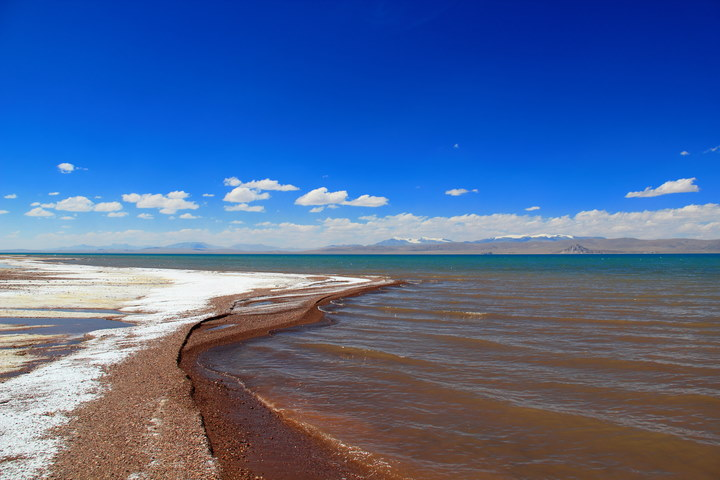

- Location within Tibet
- Location: Xainza County, Nagqu, Tibet, China
- Coordinates: 31°53′41″N 87°30′29.9″E
- Type: Meromictic lake
- Surface area: 260 km^{2} (100 sq mi)

Dazecuo (also known as Dagze Lake, Tibetan: སྟག་རྩེ་མཚོ, Wylie: stag rtse mtsho, THL: tak tsé tso, ZWPY: Dagzê Co; Chinese: 达则错; pinyin: Dázécuò) is one of many inland lakes in Tibet. It is a salt lake on the Tibetan Plateau in Xainza County within Nagqu in the Tibet Autonomous Region of China. It was reported in 2021 that the lake receives "good environmental protection".

It has an area of 260 km^{2} (100 square miles) and an elevation of 4,459 meters above sea level. In 2021 the lake was 21.1 kilometers in length and 16.9 kilometers wide.

In glacial times, the region was considerably wetter, and lakes were correspondingly much larger. Changes in climate have resulted in greater aridity on the Tibetan Plateau. The numerous concentric rings that circle the lake are fossil shorelines, and attest to the historical presence of a larger, deeper lake.

== See also ==
- Bangecuo
- Gomang Co
- Lake Urru
- Namtso
- Siling Lake
- List of lakes of China
