= Tso Ngön =

Lake in Nagqu, Tibet, China

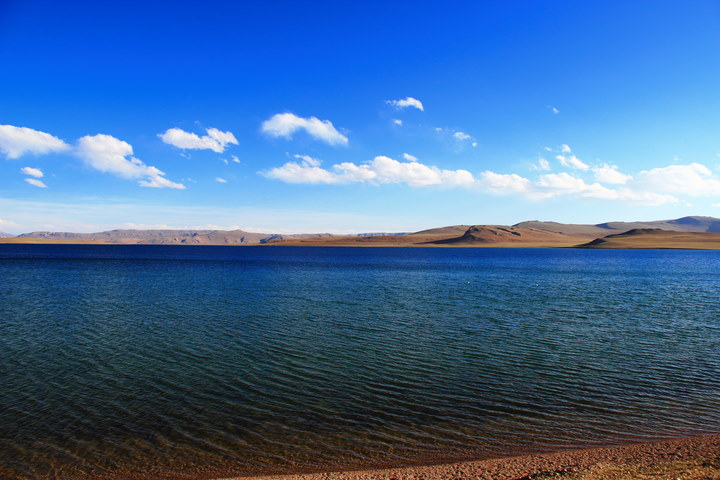

- Location within Tibet
- Coordinates: 31°36′N 88°46′E
- Primary inflows: Yongzhu Zangbu
- Catchment area: 6,338 km^{2} (2,400 sq mi)
- Basin countries: China
- Max. length: 28.5 km (18 mi)
- Max. width: 16.7 km (10 mi)
- Surface area: 269 km^{2} (100 sq mi)
- Surface elevation: 4,561 m (14,964 ft)

Tso Ngön (Tibetan: མཚོ་སྔོན, Wylie: mtsho sngon; Chinese: 错鄂; pinyin: Cuò È) is a plateau lake in Xainza County, Tibet Autonomous Region, southwest of China. The lake is part of the Siling Lake drainage system. The shoreline is deeply indented by bays, and the lake is dotted by many islands. It is 28.5 km long and 16.7 km wide and has an area of 269 square km.
