= Dagze (disambiguation) =

Dagze or Dazi may refer to:

- Dagzê County, county in Tibet
- Dagze Lake, in Tibet
- Dagzê, Nyingchi, village in Nyingchi County
