= Xiongmei =

Xiongmei 雄梅镇
- Town
- Location in Tibet
- Coordinates: 31°23′46″N 89°00′47″E
- Country: China
- Region: Tibet
- Prefecture: Nagqu
- County: Xainza
- Village-level divisions: 10 villages
- Elevation: 4,644 m (15,236 ft)
- Time zone: UTC+8 (China Standard)

Xiongmei (Chinese: 雄梅; pinyin: Xióngméi; Standard Tibetan: ???) is a town of Xainza County, in central Tibet Autonomous Region, China, located about 20 km (12 mi) south of Siling Lake. As of 2011, it has 10 villages under its administration.
