= Bangecuo =

Lake in Nagqu, Tibet, China

Bangor Co
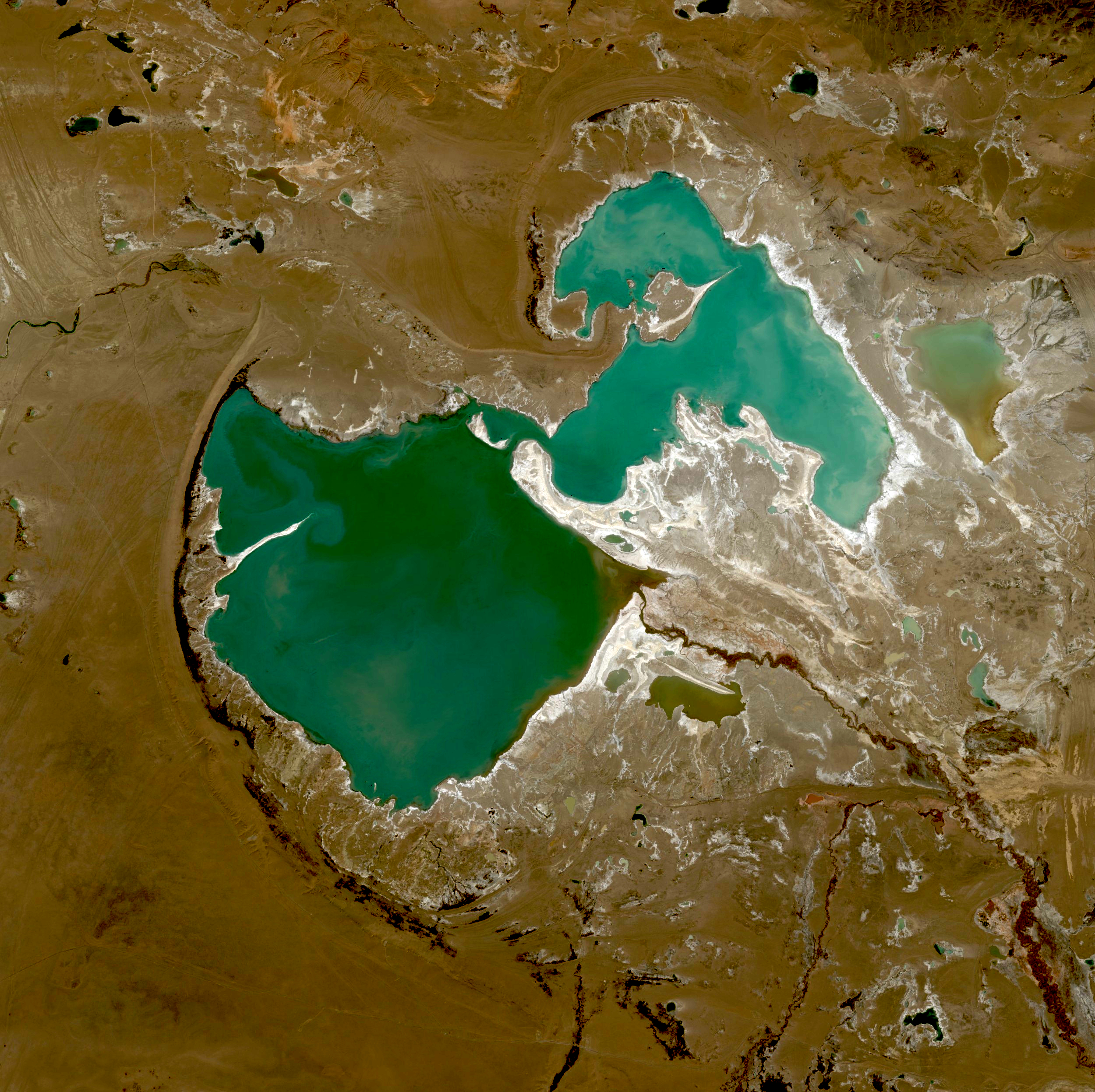
- Sentinel-2 image (2021)

- Location within Tibet
- Location: Xainza County, Nagqu, Tibet, China
- Coordinates: 31°44′16.5″N 89°28′35.8″E

Bangecuo (also spelled as Bangor Co, Tibetan: བྲང་ཁོག་མཚོ, Wylie: brang khog mtsho, ZWPY: Drangkhok Tso; Chinese: 班戈错; pinyin: Bāngēcuò) is a graben basin salt lake on the Tibetan Plateau in Xainza County within Nagqu in the Tibet Autonomous Region of China.

It was reported in 2003 that the water levels of Siling Lake and Bangecuo had increased by 19.34% since 1969.

Siling Lake is another nearby salt lake located west of Bangecuo, around four miles away.

== See also ==
- Dazecuo
- Gomang Co
- Lake Urru
- Namtso
