= Gomang Co =

Lake in Tibet, China

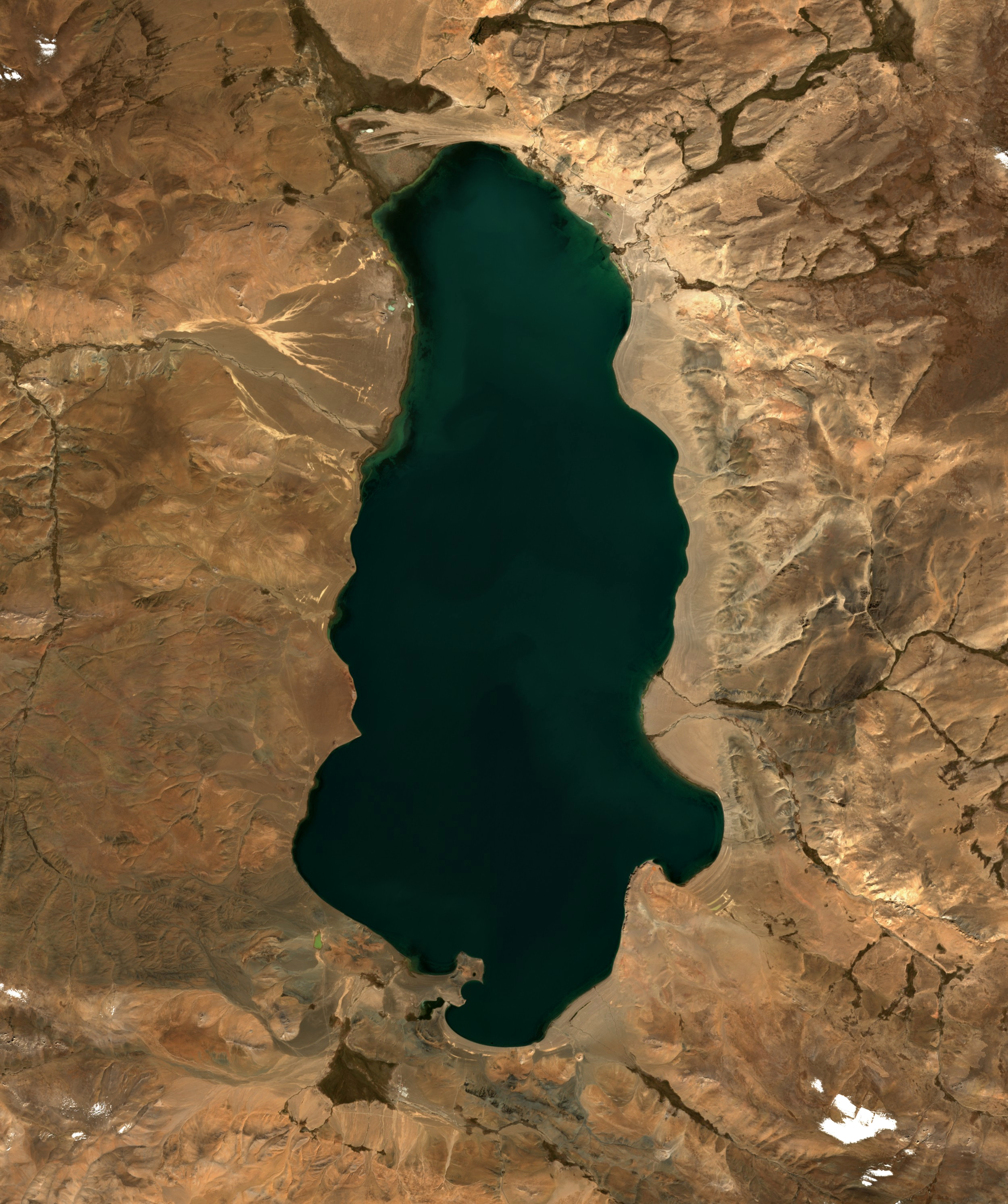
- Sentinel-2 image (2021)

- Location within Tibet
- Location: Xainza County, Nagqu, Tibet, China
- Coordinates: 31°12′51″N 89°12′17″E

Gomang Co (also spelled as Guomang Cuo and Guomangcuo, Tibetan: སྒོ་མང་མཚོ, Wylie: sgo mang mtsho, ZWPY: Gomang Tso; Chinese: 果忙错; pinyin: Guǒmángcuò) is a mountain graben basin lake on the Tibetan Plateau in Xainza County within Nagqu in the Tibet Autonomous Region of China. Gomang Co has a Köppen climate classification of existing in a tundra climate. The lake's water level is controlled by its outlet toward Siling Lake, which is north of Gomang Co.

== See also ==
- Bangecuo
- Dazecuo
- Lake Urru
- Namtso
