= Xainza =

- Town

Tibetan transcription(s)
  - Tibetan: ཤན་རྩ་རྫོང
  - Wylie transliteration: shan rtsa rdzong
  - official transcription (PRC): Xainza
  - THDL: Shentsa

Chinese transcription(s)
  - Traditional: 申扎镇
  - Simplified: 申扎县
  - Pinyin: Shēnzhā Xiàn
- Location within Tibet
- Coordinates: 30°56′5″N 88°42′17″E
- Country: China
- Region: Tibet
- Prefecture: Nagqu Prefecture
- County: Xainza County

Area
  - Total: 2,146 km^{2} (829 sq mi)

Population (2004)
  - Total: 17,000
  - Major Nationalities: Tibetan
  - Regional dialect: Tibetan language
- Time zone: +8

not to be confused with Naktsang Town in the Haa District of southwestern Bhutan

Xainza (also Naktsang, Xainza Town or Shantsa) is a town and township-level administrative unit and seat of Shentsa County or Xainza County, Nagqu Prefecture, Tibet Autonomous Region, China.

It covers an area of 2146 square kilometres and in 2004 had a total population of about 17,000. The township was established by the Chinese in 1961. The main occupation is animal husbandry, mainly yak, goat and sheep rearing.

== Villages ==
The township-level division contains the following settlements:

- Gasangduo (neighborhood) (嘎桑多居委会)
- Rongsaiduo (neighborhood) (融塞多居委会)
- Nacha (拿查村)
- Luopu (罗普村 )
- Qiangrong (羌戎村)
- Qubu (曲布村)
- Yongzhu Woma (永珠沃玛村)
- Rennaduo (仁那多村)
