= Lake Urru =

Urru Lake
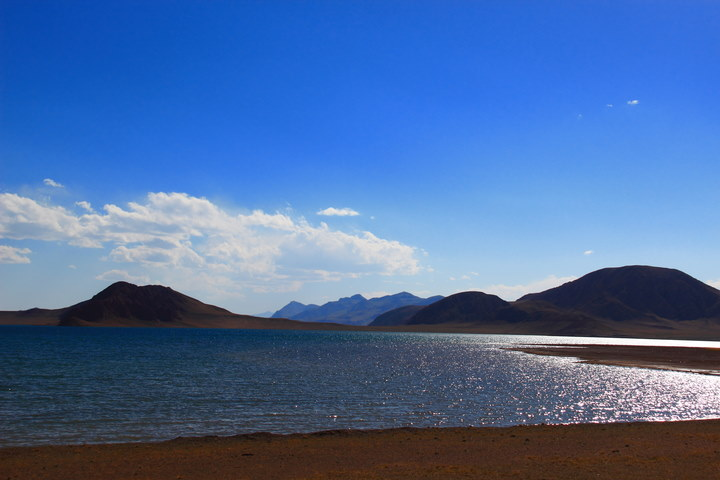

- Location within Tibet
- Coordinates: 31°43′N 88°00′E
- Type: Freshwater lake
- Catchment area: 14,262 km^{2} (5,500 sq mi)
- Basin countries: China
- Max. length: 33.6 km (21 mi)
- Max. width: 13.4 km (8 mi)
- Surface area: 342.7 km^{2} (100 sq mi)
- Surface elevation: 4,548 m (14,921 ft)

Urru Lake (Tibetan: འུར་རུ་མཚོ, Wylie: ur ru mtsho; Chinese: 吴如错; pinyin: Wúrú Cuò) is a plateau lake in Nagqu Prefecture, Tibet Autonomous Region, southwest of China, located between Nyima County and Xainza County. The lake, which is part of the Siling Lake drainage system, is fed by several rivers and drains eastward into Jargö Lake. It is 33.6 km long and 13.4 km wide and has an area of 342.7 square km.

== See also ==
- Bangecuo
- Gomang Co
- Namtso
