= Siling Lake =

Lake in Tibet

Siling Lake / Selincuo
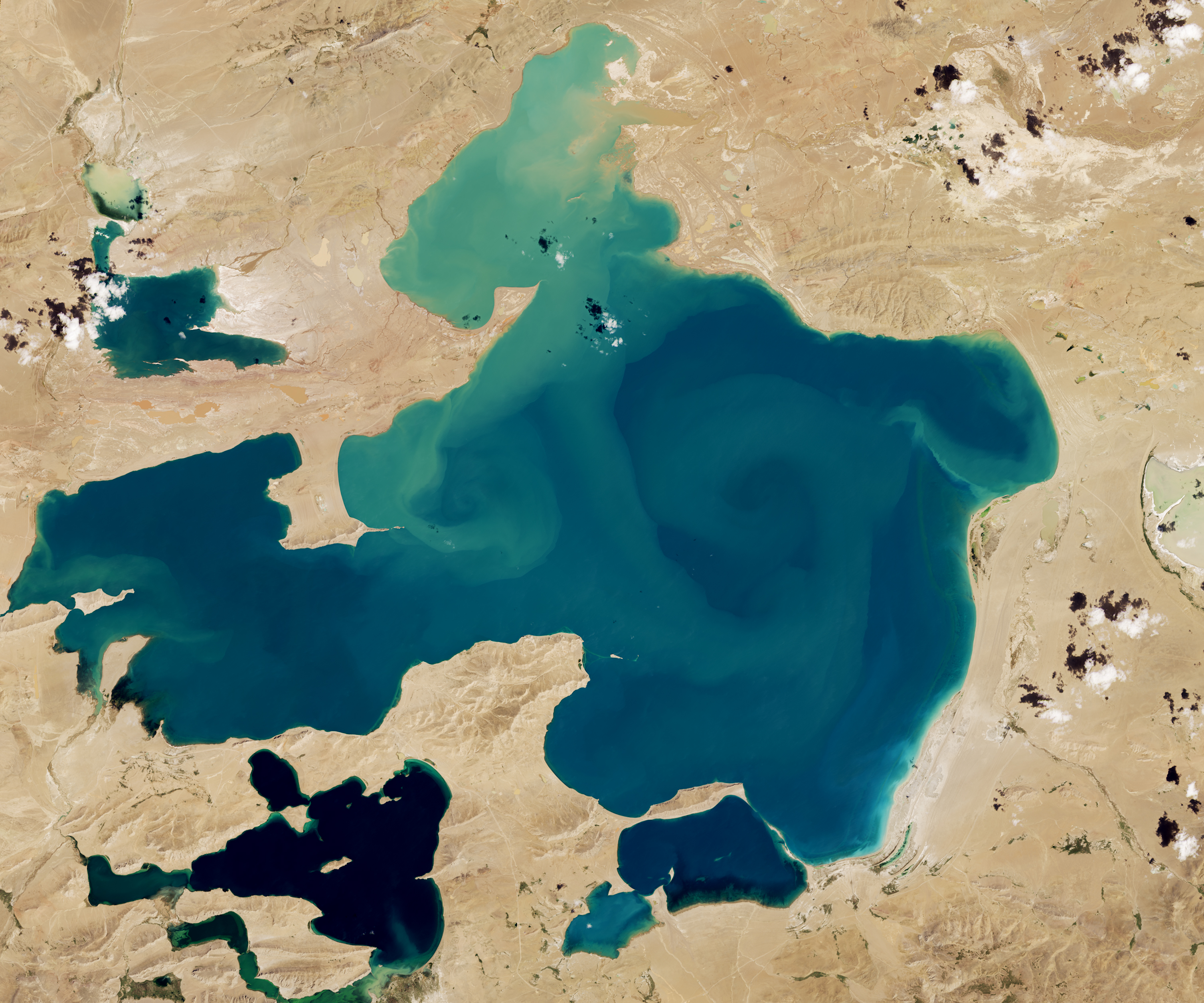

- Location within Tibet
- Location: Nagqu Prefecture, Tibet, China
- Coordinates: 31°50′N 89°00′E
- Basin countries: China
- Surface area: 1,865 km^{2} (720 sq mi)
- Surface elevation: 4,530 metres (14,860 ft)

Ramsar Wetland
- Official name: Tibet Selincuo Wetlands
- Designated: 8 January 2018
- Reference no.: 2352

Siling Lake

Siling Lake (Tibetan: སེར་གླིང་མཚོ, Wylie: ser gling mtsho, ZWPY: Sêling Co; Chinese: 色林错; pinyin: Sèlín cuò) (also known as Qilin or Selincuo) is a salt lake in the Tibet Autonomous Region, China to the north of Xainza. Administratively it belongs to Xainza County and Baingoin County of Nagqu prefecture-level city. Doijiang is located near the lake, whilst Bangecuo is another nearby salt lake around four miles away to the east.

== Overview ==
The lake lies at an altitude of 4,530 metres (14,860 ft). It is a salt lake fed by the rivers Za'gya Zangbo (or Tsagya Tsangpo) (扎加藏布) and the Boques Tsangpo (波曲藏布). With an area of 1,865 km^{2} (720 sq mi), Siling Co is the largest saltwater lake in the northern Tibetan Plateau and forms part of the Xainza Nature Reserve. This 400,000-hectare (990,000-acre) reserve was established in 1993 and contains significant populations of black-necked cranes and some 120 species of birds in total. The lake only has a single species of fish, Gymnocypris selincuoensis, exploited by fishermen. The prairie on the banks of the lake is traditionally used as grazing land for yaks and sheep.

== Climate ==
Siling Lake has an alpine climate (Köppen ETH) bordering upon a dry-winter subalpine climate (Dwc), characterised by pleasant summers with cold mornings, and frigid, exceedingly dry winters. The temperature at the lake is an annual average of −0.9 °C (30.4 °F), and the maximum monthly average temperature in July is 9.6 °C (49.3 °F). The average precipitation is 290 mm (11 in) per year, 90 percent of which falls in the months of June to September, often as hail.

Climate data for Siling Lake
Month	Jan	Feb	Mar	Apr	May	Jun	Jul	Aug	Sep	Oct	Nov	Dec	Year
Mean daily maximum °C (°F)	−4.7 (23.5)	−2.7 (27.1)	1.2 (34.2)	5.7 (42.3)	10.1 (50.2)	14.8 (58.6)	15.7 (60.3)	14.5 (58.1)	12.4 (54.3)	6.2 (43.2)	0.0 (32.0)	−3.2 (26.2)	5.8 (42.5)
Daily mean °C (°F)	−11.9 (10.6)	−9.8 (14.4)	−5.9 (21.4)	−1.3 (29.7)	3.1 (37.6)	7.9 (46.2)	9.6 (49.3)	8.7 (47.7)	6.3 (43.3)	−0.3 (31.5)	−7.0 (19.4)	−10.4 (13.3)	−0.9 (30.4)
Mean daily minimum °C (°F)	−19.0 (−2.2)	−16.8 (1.8)	−12.9 (8.8)	−8.2 (17.2)	−3.8 (25.2)	1.1 (34.0)	3.5 (38.3)	3.0 (37.4)	0.2 (32.4)	−6.7 (19.9)	−14.0 (6.8)	−17.6 (0.3)	−7.6 (18.3)
Average precipitation mm (inches)	2 (0.1)	2 (0.1)	2 (0.1)	5 (0.2)	13 (0.5)	39 (1.5)	78 (3.1)	74 (2.9)	39 (1.5)	7 (0.3)	1 (0.0)	1 (0.0)	263 (10.3)
Source: Climate-Data.org

== See also ==
- Bangecuo
- Dazecuo
- Gomang Co
- Lake Urru
