= Xainza County =

Xainza County 申扎县 • ཤན་རྩ་རྫོང་། Shantsa, Shentsa
- County
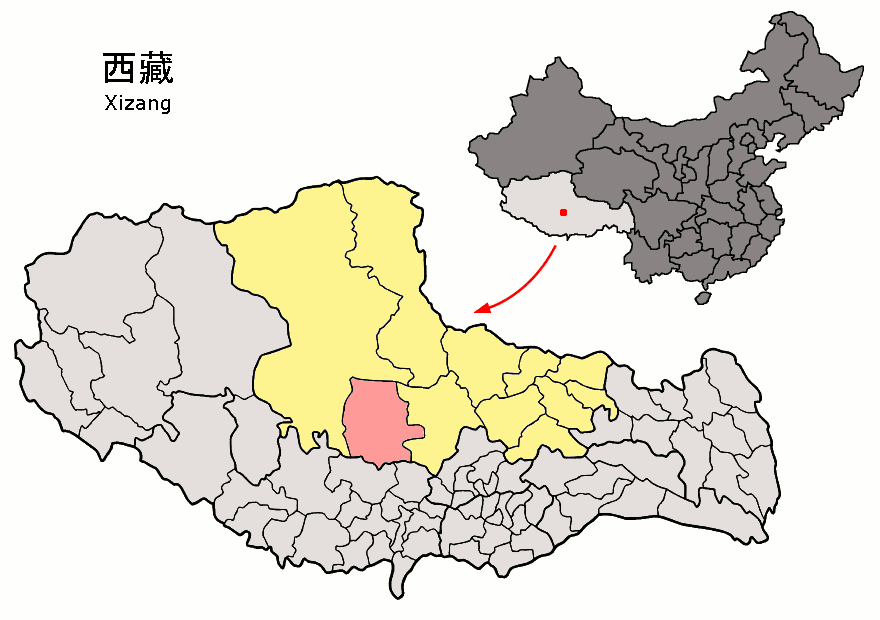
- Location of Xainza County within Tibet

- Location in Tibet Xainza County (China)
- Coordinates: 31°01′15″N 88°48′02″E
- Country: China
- Autonomous region: Tibet
- Prefecture-level city: Nagqu
- County seat: Xainza (Naktsang)

Area
  - Total: 25,546 km^{2} (9,863 sq mi)

Population (2020)
  - Total: 21,768
  - Density: 0.85211/km^{2} (2.2070/sq mi)
- Time zone: UTC+8 (China Standard)
- Website: www.xzszx.gov.cn

Xainza County

Chinese name
- Simplified Chinese: 申扎县
- Traditional Chinese: 申扎縣
Transcriptions
Standard Mandarin
- Hanyu Pinyin: Shēnzhā Xiàn

Tibetan name
- Tibetan: ཤན་རྩ་རྫོང་།
Transcriptions
- Wylie: shan rtsa rdzong
- Tibetan Pinyin: Xainza Zong

Xainza County, also Shantsa, Shentsa, (Tibetan: ཤན་རྩ་རྫོང; Chinese: 申扎县) is a county within Nagqu of the Tibet Autonomous Region of China. In 1999 the county had a population of 16,190.

== Geography ==
The capital lies at Naktsang Town or Xainza. The county covers an area of 25,546 square kilometres (9,863 sq mi). Until recent times the County extended all the way from the borders of Xinjiang in the north to the Yarlung Tsangpo River in the south, covering a larger area than the United Kingdom. It has since been split into two, Shentsa (Xainza) County and the new Nyima County to the east.

"In this region there are 67 lakes, including some of Tibet's largest: Serling, Dangra Yutso, Ngangtse-tso, Kering-tso, Taktse-tse and Uru-tso. In the northeast there are a number of 6,000 m peaks including Purok Gangri 6,482 metres (21,266 ft) and Norla Gangri 6,136 metres (20,131 ft), not to mention the Kunlun mountains on the Xinjiang border further north. The entire northern region forms part of the Jangtang Nature Reserve. Ten large salt fields testify to the importance of this region for the traditional trading commodity of the Jangtang Plateau."

Lakes in close proximity to the main town are Geren Lake, Mujiu Lake, Anzi Lake, Guomang Lake, Cuo'e and Ziguii Lake, Wuru Lake, Siling Lake and Bangecuo. With an area of 1,865 square kilometres (720 sq mi), Siling Lake is the second largest saltwater lake in the northern Tibetan Plateau and forms part of the Siling Co National Nature Reserve (also Selincuo Reserve or Xainza Nature Reserve). The 400,000 hectares (990,000 acres) reserve was established in 1993 and contains significant populations of black-necked cranes and some 120 species of birds in total. Tibetan sheep, wild donkey, argali, snow leopards, bar-headed goose, etc., also inhabit the county.

2 U.S. Army Topographic maps of Xainza

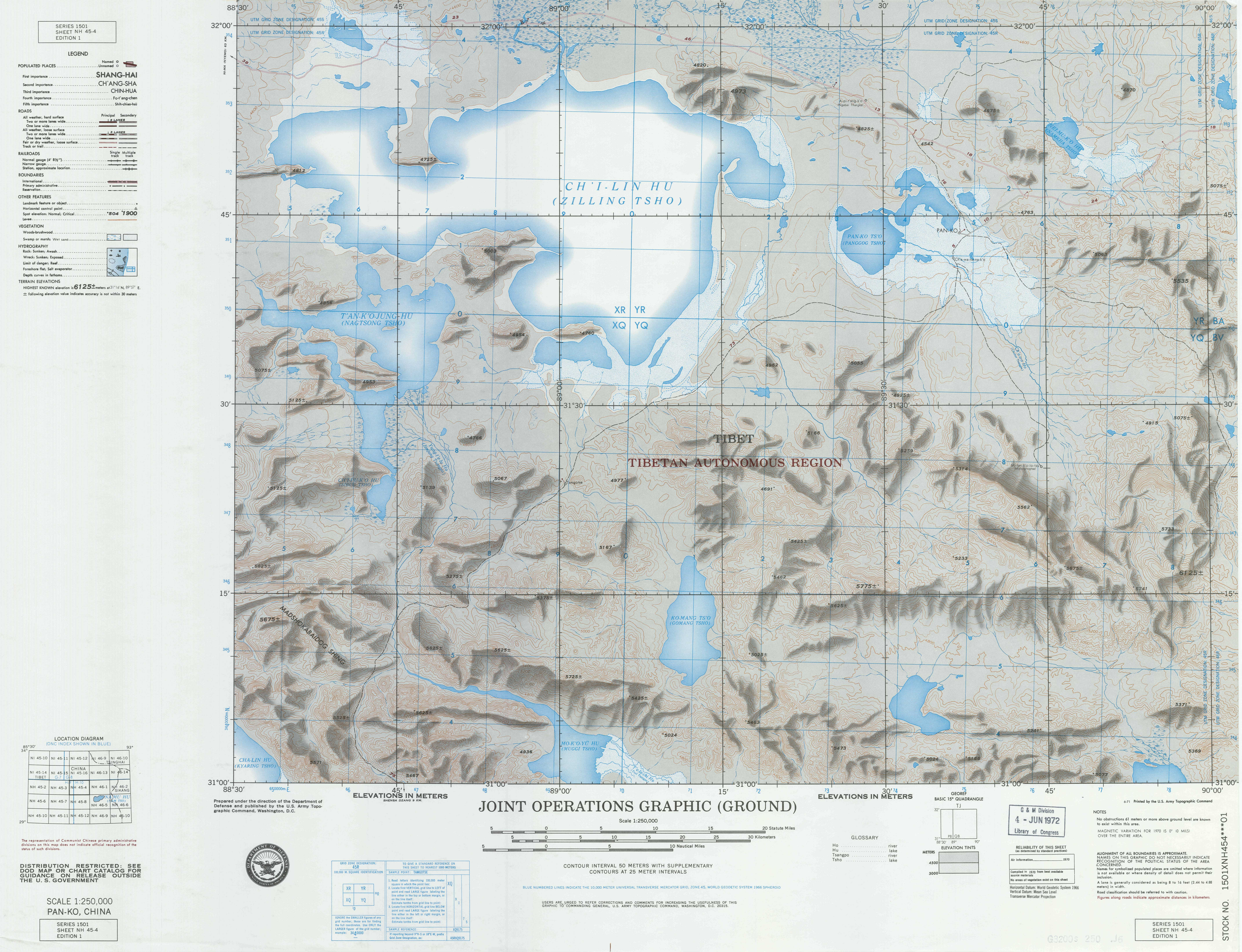
1501 sheet NH 45-4

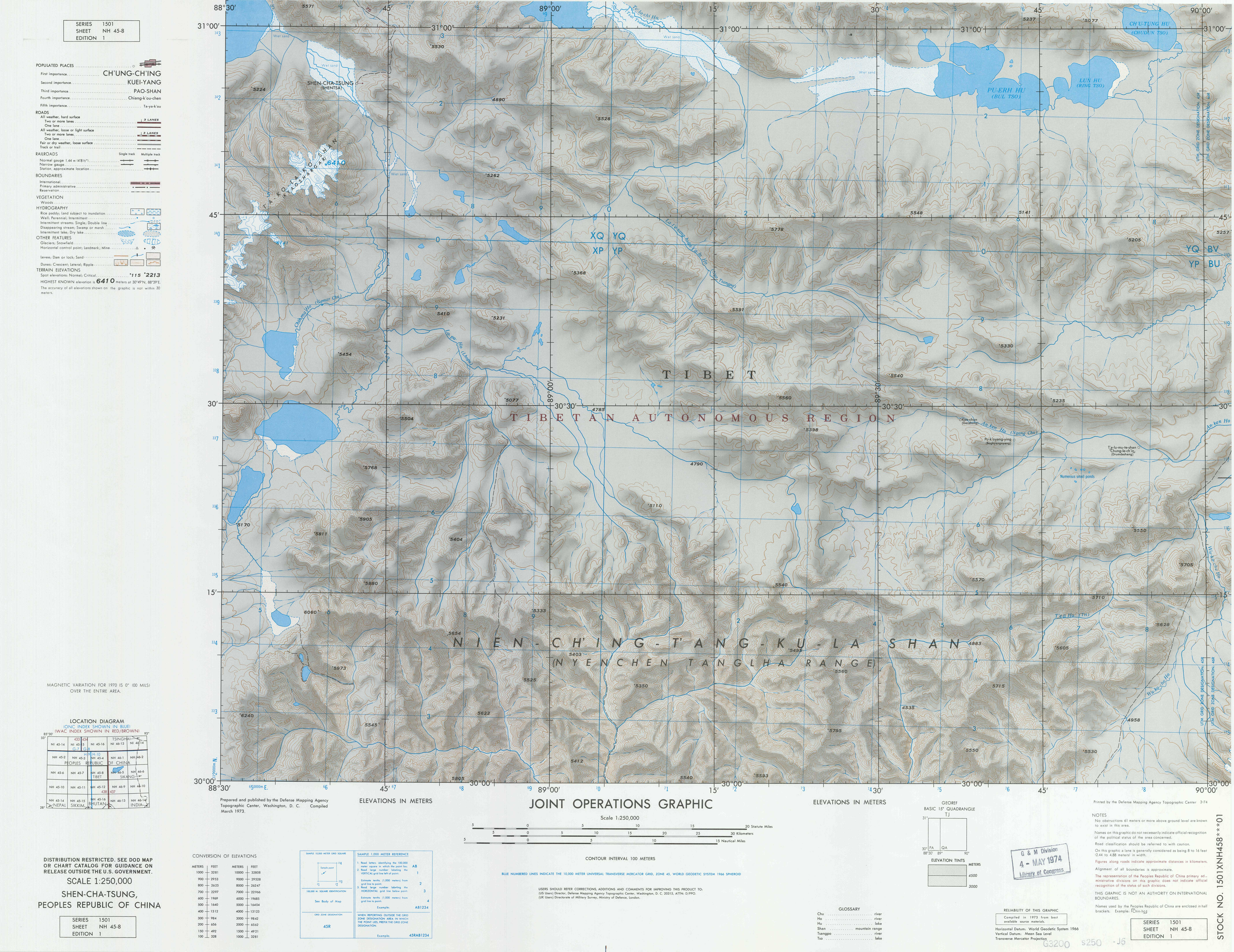
1501 sheet NH 45-8

=== Climate ===
Xainza has a dry-winter subalpine climate (Köppen Dwc), bordering on alpine (ETH). The climate of the county is typical of a plateau climate zone, featuring thin, cold and dry air, with 279.1 mornings of frost per year on average. The average annual wind speed is 3.8 metres per second (14 km/h; 8.5 mph; 7.4 kn), the average annual temperature is 0.4 °C (32.7 °F), and the average annual precipitation is 298.6 millimetres (11.76 in).

Climate data for Xainza, elevation 4,672 m (15,328 ft), (1991–2020 normals)
Month	Jan	Feb	Mar	Apr	May	Jun	Jul	Aug	Sep	Oct	Nov	Dec	Year
Record high °C (°F)	12.5 (54.5)	11.0 (51.8)	15.4 (59.7)	22.9 (73.2)	25.7 (78.3)	31.0 (87.8)	25.0 (77.0)	28.0 (82.4)	26.0 (78.8)	21.0 (69.8)	17.8 (64.0)	11.5 (52.7)	31.0 (87.8)
Mean daily maximum °C (°F)	−2.0 (28.4)	−0.4 (31.3)	3.0 (37.4)	6.7 (44.1)	11.3 (52.3)	15.9 (60.6)	16.4 (61.5)	15.5 (59.9)	13.7 (56.7)	8.1 (46.6)	2.8 (37.0)	−0.2 (31.6)	7.6 (45.6)
Daily mean °C (°F)	−9.4 (15.1)	−7.6 (18.3)	−4.1 (24.6)	−0.1 (31.8)	4.5 (40.1)	9.0 (48.2)	10.2 (50.4)	9.5 (49.1)	7.4 (45.3)	1.1 (34.0)	−4.6 (23.7)	−7.8 (18.0)	0.7 (33.2)
Mean daily minimum °C (°F)	−16.3 (2.7)	−14.5 (5.9)	−10.9 (12.4)	−6.2 (20.8)	−1.5 (29.3)	3.2 (37.8)	5.3 (41.5)	4.8 (40.6)	2.3 (36.1)	−4.7 (23.5)	−11.2 (11.8)	−14.8 (5.4)	−5.4 (22.3)
Record low °C (°F)	−30.9 (−23.6)	−28.5 (−19.3)	−23.0 (−9.4)	−18.8 (−1.8)	−17.0 (1.4)	−8.1 (17.4)	−7.0 (19.4)	−4.0 (24.8)	−11.0 (12.2)	−16.9 (1.6)	−23.4 (−10.1)	−30.0 (−22.0)	−30.9 (−23.6)
Average precipitation mm (inches)	1.4 (0.06)	1.2 (0.05)	2.3 (0.09)	6.6 (0.26)	20.5 (0.81)	54.2 (2.13)	97.1 (3.82)	102.6 (4.04)	47.9 (1.89)	7.9 (0.31)	1.7 (0.07)	1.2 (0.05)	344.6 (13.58)
Average precipitation days (≥ 0.1 mm)	2.3	2.2	2.6	5.0	9.2	14.9	20.5	21.4	14.8	3.9	1.4	1.2	99.4
Average snowy days	3.9	4.4	5.6	8.6	12.7	5.5	0.7	0.9	5.2	5.1	2.5	2.7	57.8
Average relative humidity (%)	31	29	30	37	44	52	61	64	59	41	34	29	43
Mean monthly sunshine hours	223.9	216.9	255.2	261.6	282.0	255.6	227.4	213.9	242.3	274.1	248.5	236.1	2,937.5
Percentage possible sunshine	69	69	68	67	66	60	53	53	66	79	79	75	67
Source 1: China Meteorological Administration
Source 2: Météo Climat

=== Geology ===
The county has been geologically well assessed in publications. Xainza contains an Ordovician to Silurian stratigraphic succession and the area is part of the Xainza-Jiali Fault Zone. Significant Triassic clastic deposits with gypsum beds and volcanic clastics have been found between Xainza and Coqên. Early Devonian (Pragian-Emsian) rocks in Xainza County are said to "yield a shallow-marine, carbonate-platform fauna of corals, brachiopods, dacryoconarids, nautiloids and conodonts."

==== Lakes ====
- Tso Ngön

== Economy ==
Animal husbandry is the chief source of income in the county. Jiagang Hydropower Station was built in the 1990s and as of 2008 serves about 20,000 nomadic households across the county. Gold mining in the county has reportedly affected water quality and some area of grassland. An alluvial gold mine which generated "5 million yuan (US$617,300) of the county's 8.5-million budgetary income" was slated to be shut down in 2005. Other reserves include iron, lead, copper, salt, borax and phosphorus. The county has a reported geothermal resources area of about 100,000 square meters and is rich in fish resources.

== Administrative divisions ==
The county contains 2 towns and 6 townships.

"The county capital of Shentsa is located at Naktsang (Shentsa), 805 km from Lumaringpo in Gertse county, and 232 km from Palgon. However, due to the vastness of this region, there is a third administrative centre at Tsonyi (Twin Lakes) in the north. Naktsang (Shentsa) to Tsonyi is 442 km."

Name	Chinese	Hanyu Pinyin	Tibetan	Wylie
Towns
Xainza Town (Shantsa, Naktsang)	申扎镇	Shēnzhā zhèn	ཤན་རྩ་གྲོང་རྡལ།	shan rtsa grong rdal
Xungmai Town	雄梅镇	Xióngméi zhèn	གཞུང་སྨད་གྲོང་རྡལ།	gzhung smad grong rdal
Townships
Zhago Township	下过乡	Xiàguò xiāng	བཞ་སྒོ་ཤང་།	bzha sgor shang
Khyak Township	卡乡	Kǎ xiāng	འཁྱག་ཤང་།	'khyag shang
Patra Township	巴扎乡	Bāzhā xiāng	པ་བཀྲ་ཤང་།	pa bkra shang
Tarma Township	塔尔玛乡	Tǎ'ěrmǎ xiāng	ཐར་མ་ཤང་།	thar ma shang
Mepa Township	买巴乡	Mǎibā xiāng	སྨད་པ་ཤང་།	smad pa shang
Mar'yo Township	马跃乡	Mǎyuè xiāng	མར་ཡོ་ཤང་།	mar yo shang
