= Oasis Valley =

Coordinates: 36°55′00″N 116°45′33″W

Oasis Valley is a valley in the Amargosa Desert near Beatty in Nye County, western Nevada. The valley forms part of the southern drainage of Pahute Mesa. The Amargosa River flows through the Oasis Valley between the Bare Mountains and the Bullfrog Hills to the Amargosa Valley.

== Natural history ==
Oasis Valley is a portion of the Upper Amargosa Watershed. It includes geologic features of the Timber Mountain-Oasis Valley caldera complex of the Southwest Nevada volcanic field.

The Amargosa toad is endemic to the Oasis Valley section of the Amargosa River, with its threatened population being successfully increased by local citizen efforts.
