= Pahute Mesa (landform) =

Mesa in Nevada, United States

- Mesa
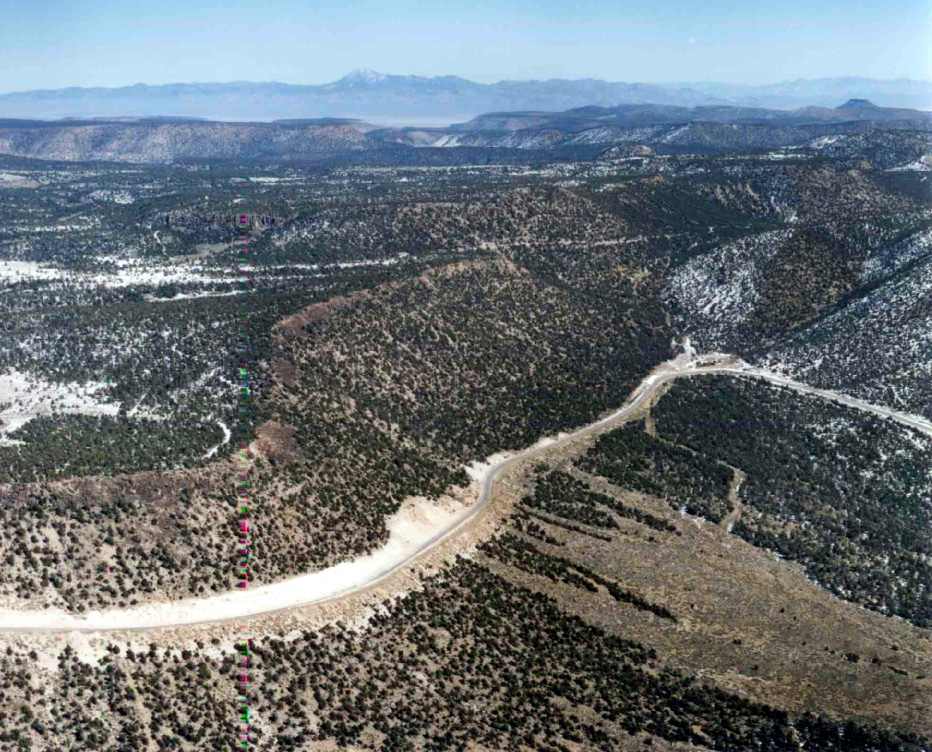
- section of Pahute Mesa (southeast, at Test Site)

- Pahute Mesa (mesa) in Nevada
- Coordinates: 37.268547°N 116.809234°W
- Location: Beatty, NV, Nye, (southwest)-Great Basin region) ((north)-Mojave Desert border), Nevada, United States

Dimensions
  - Length: 60 mi (97 km)
  - Width: 25 mi (40 km)
- River: Amargosa River

The Pahute Mesa is a large, 60 miles (97 km) long mesa in southern Nye County, Nevada. The mesa's southeast region lies in the Nevada Test Site which is southeast; the region in the test site is called Pahute Mesa, one of the major test site sub-regions.

The central, and some southeast sections of the Pahute Mesa are the south-southwest flowing upland watersheds of the Amargosa River which flows south past Beatty and the Bare Mountains. The river enters the Amargosa Desert and Valley just south of Beatty, a northeast watershed tributary to southern Death Valley.

== Description ==
The mesa is variable in width but generally from 20 to 25 mi wide. The mesa extends northwest to southeast with the east merging into the Eleana Range at the center-north of the Nevada Test Site. The mesa forms the southwest border of the Nellis Air Force Range, at the northeast of Sarcobatus Flat; the Nellis Range border then turns north to end adjacent Tonopah, Nevada, about 65 mi (105 km) distant.

=== Peaks, and highpoint ===
The highest peak in the northwest end of the mesa is Tolicha Peak, 7,054 feet (2,150 m). Quartz Mountain, 6,945 feet (2,117 m), is adjacent 3 mi (5 km) east. Other peaks occur in the southeast where the mesa merges into the northwest of the Eleana Range.

== Access ==
Route U.S. 95 traverses the southwest border of Pahute Mesa at the northeast of Sarcobatus Flat, the road from Beatty to Goldfield, Nevada. Since the mesa and regions north are part of the Nellis Air Force Range, access from the north is from Tonopah and U.S. Route 6 in Nevada, going by way of Gold Flat and other regions south of the Cactus Range, anchoring the northwest corner of the Air Force Range.

== See also ==
- Pahute Mesa Airstrip, at south of Nevada Test Site
