= Amargosa =

Amargosa is the Spanish name of the plant Centaurium erythraea. It may also refer to:

== Western United States ==
=== Animals ===
- Amargosa toad
- Amargosa vole
- Amargosa Pupfish Station, Nevada

=== Natural geography ===
- Amargosa Desert
- Amargosa Range
- Amargosa River
  - Amargosa River Area of Critical Environmental Concern and Wild and Scenic River
- Amargosa Valley

=== Populated places and buildings ===
- Amargosa Valley, Nevada, a community within the Amargosa Desert/Valley
- Death Valley Junction, California, formerly named Amargosa
  - Amargosa Opera House and Hotel in Death Valley Junction, California
- Amargosa, Texas, a census designated place in Texas

== Brazil ==
- Amargosa, Brazil
  - Roman Catholic Diocese of Amargosa, in Brazil
