= Bare Mountain Range (Nevada) =

Mountain range in Nevada, United States

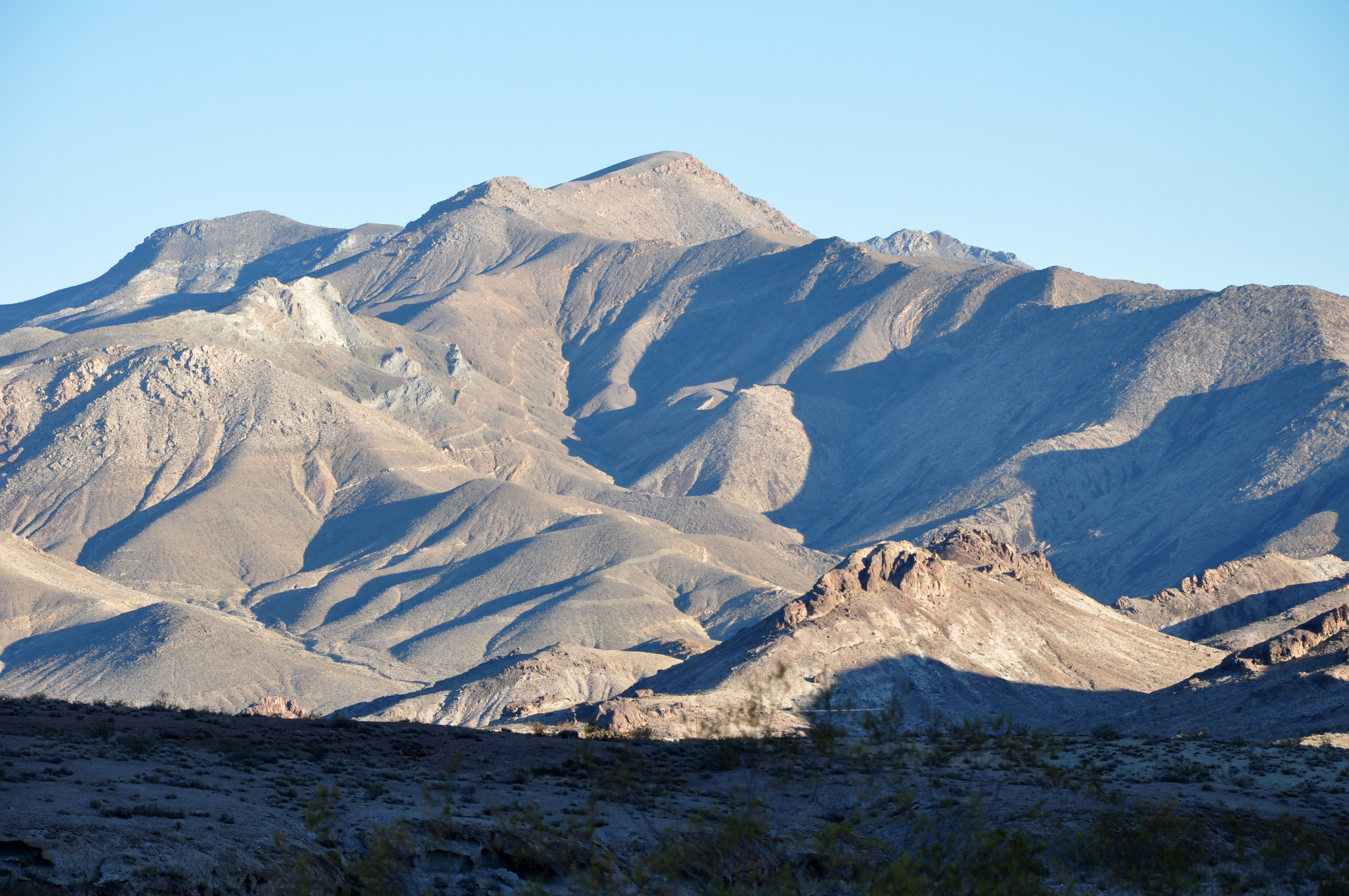
- Bare Mountain as seen from the Bullfrog Hills west of Beatty

Highest point
- Peak: Bare Mountain
- Elevation: 6,273 ft (1,912 m)

Dimensions
- Length: 9 mi (14 km) NW x SE
- Width: 5 mi (8.0 km)

Geography
- Location within Nevada
- Country: United States
- State: Nevada
- Region: Amargosa Desert
- County: Nye County
- Rivers: Amargosa River
- Municipality: Beatty
- Range coordinates: 36°50′33.813″N 116°40′27.21″W
- Borders on: Bullfrog Hills-NW; Yucca Mountain-E; Amargosa Valley-S & SE
- Topo map: USGS Carrara Canyon

The Bare Mountain Range is a mountain range in southern Nye County, Nevada, in the western United States. Bare Mountain and Wildcat Peak are the high points of the range.

== Geography ==
The Bare Mountain Range is a short range, about 9 miles (14 km) long, trending northwest by southeast. The north end of the range borders Beatty on the Amargosa River. The Bullfrog Hills lie to the northwest of Beatty. Yucca Mountain lies about nine miles to the east across Crater Flat. The range borders the central and northeast Amargosa Desert, which also trends northwest by southeast. U.S. Route 95 runs in the Amargosa Valley along the south edge of the range and turns at Beatty to continue north through Oasis Valley.

The highest peak of the range is Bare Mountain, of the same name, at 6,273 feet (1,912 m). In the southeast of the range, Wildcat Peak rises to 5,052 feet (1,540 m)

Bare Mountain Range was descriptively named for the bare summits.

== See also ==
- Amargosa toad
