= Pioneer, Nevada =

- Ghost town
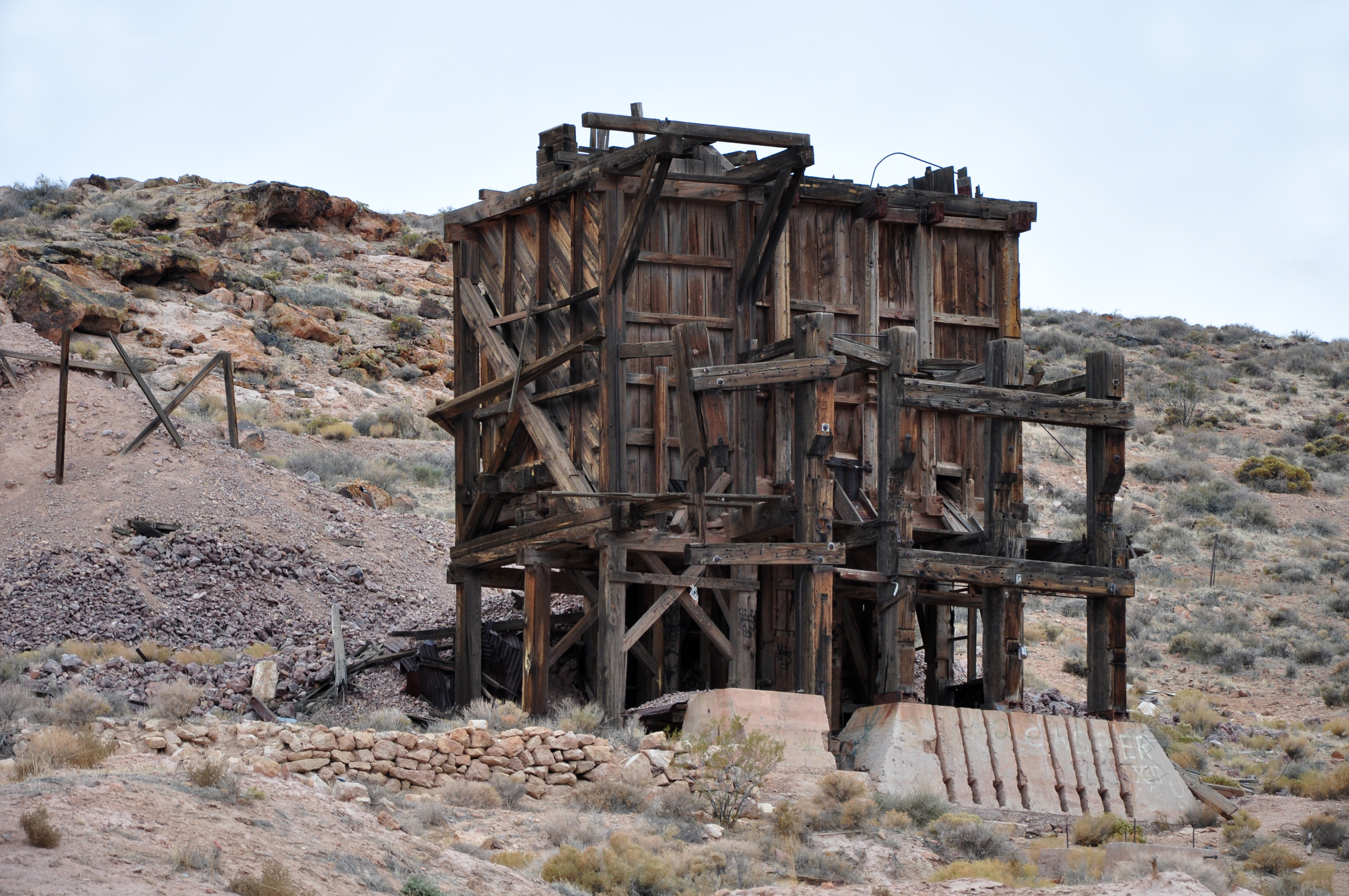
- Ruins at Pioneer, Nevada, a former mining town

- Location within Nevada
- Coordinates: 37°00′19″N 116°47′02″W
- Country: United States
- State: Nevada
- County: Nye
- Elevation: 4,222 ft (1,287 m)

Population (1908)
  - Total: ~2,500
- Time zone: UTC-8 (Pacific (PST))
  - Summer (DST): PDT (UTC-7)

Pioneer is a ghost town in Nye County, in the U.S. state of Nevada. Beginning as a mining camp near the Mayflower and other gold mines in northern Bullfrog Hills, it became a formal town in 1908 and flourished briefly until fire destroyed much of its business district in 1909 and litigation delayed mining. Population peaked at an estimated 2,500 in 1908, and the community survived at least through the closing of the Pioneer post office in 1931. Mining continued near the town site through 1941. Few remnants of Pioneer structures survived through the end of the 20th century.

== Geography ==
Pioneer is on the north side of the Bullfrog Hills along Pioneer Road, a gravel road off U.S. Route 95. It is about 7 miles (11 km) north of Beatty, 8 miles (13 km) northeast of the ghost towns of Rhyolite and Bullfrog, and 130 miles (210 km) northwest of Las Vegas. Desert springs in or near the Oasis Valley of the Amargosa River are 2 to 4 miles (3.2 to 6.4 km) east of Pioneer. Donovan Mountain in the Bullfrog Hills rises to 5,597 feet (1,706 m) above sea level near Sarcobatus Flat slightly west of the ghost town, and the northeastern corner of Death Valley National Park is about 3 miles (4.8 km) further west.

== History ==
Pioneer developed from a primitive mining camp near the Mayflower, Pioneer, and other gold mines on the north side of the Bullfrog Hills. These mines were part of the Bullfrog Mining District, which included mines on the south side of the hills in places like Rhyolite and Bullfrog. Industrialist Charles M. Schwab, who invested heavily in the Montgomery-Shoshone Mine near Rhyolite, also invested in the Mayflower in 1906. A Pioneer town-site company was formed in 1908 and began grading roads and selling lots. In that year, a daily stagecoach began making runs between Pioneer and the mining town of Springdale, about 2 miles (3.2 km) to the northeast along the Bullfrog Goldfield Railroad. Another daily stagecoach linked Pioneer and Rhyolite in 1909 along a road constructed for the purpose.

As the mines near Rhyolite declined late in the decade, some miners and businesses moved to Pioneer and in some cases took their buildings with them. A group of investors from Rhyolite and Tonopah bought the Montgomery Hotel in Beatty and moved it to Pioneer in February 1909, renaming it the Holland House, "the grandest building Pioneer would ever have". Later that spring, Pioneer's population had grown to an estimated 2,500 occupying an estimated 300 buildings. They included the town's post office, which the federal government approved in March 1909. In addition to the stagecoach, early automobiles ferried people back and forth between Pioneer and the Las Vegas and Tonopah Railroad station in Rhyolite.

Water was available by the barrel from Springdale and Crystal Springs, 3 miles (4.8 km) to the southeast. For about five months in 1909, the town had two weekly newspapers, the Pioneer Topics and the Pioneer Press. Businesses in Pioneer included a drug store, a doctor's office, a barber shop, eating establishments, a liquor store, saloons, a meat market, a general store, a bank, and boarding houses, in addition to the Holland House. Just after the town reached its peak of development in March and April 1909, a May 9 fire destroyed much of the business district, and, although the town continued to prosper for a while, "the excitement would never be the same".

The town rebuilt the business district and opened a school enrolling 44 students in mid-1909. Several mines with steady payrolls sustained Pioneer through the end of the year, but litigation slowed work at the Mayflower and other nearby mines, and the town's growth ceased. Fall enrollment at the school dropped to 24, and residents held a "Hard Times Dance" at the Holland Hotel at the beginning of 1910. Disputes about mine ownership led to further litigation, and the failure of the First National Bank of Rhyolite hampered investments in Pioneer. Stores began to close, and in August 1910, the Holland Hotel was sold to pay delinquent taxes. A shrinking population lived in or near Pioneer for many years, and the post office stayed open through early 1931. Mining, continuing in the area through the 1930s, was suspended in 1941, and did not resume on a large scale after World War II. As of 2004, little remained of Pioneer aside from "quite a bit of debris, levelled building sites, a few boards, and perhaps some foundations" and, nearby, remnants of the Mayflower headframe and ore bin.
