= BTY =

BTY or bty may refer to:

- Beatty Airport, the IATA code BTY
- Bentley railway station (Hampshire), the station code BTY
- bty, the ISO 639-3 for Bobot language
- Short for dry battery, a type of electric battery
- Artillery battery, the artillery unit size designation

== See also ==
- Battery
