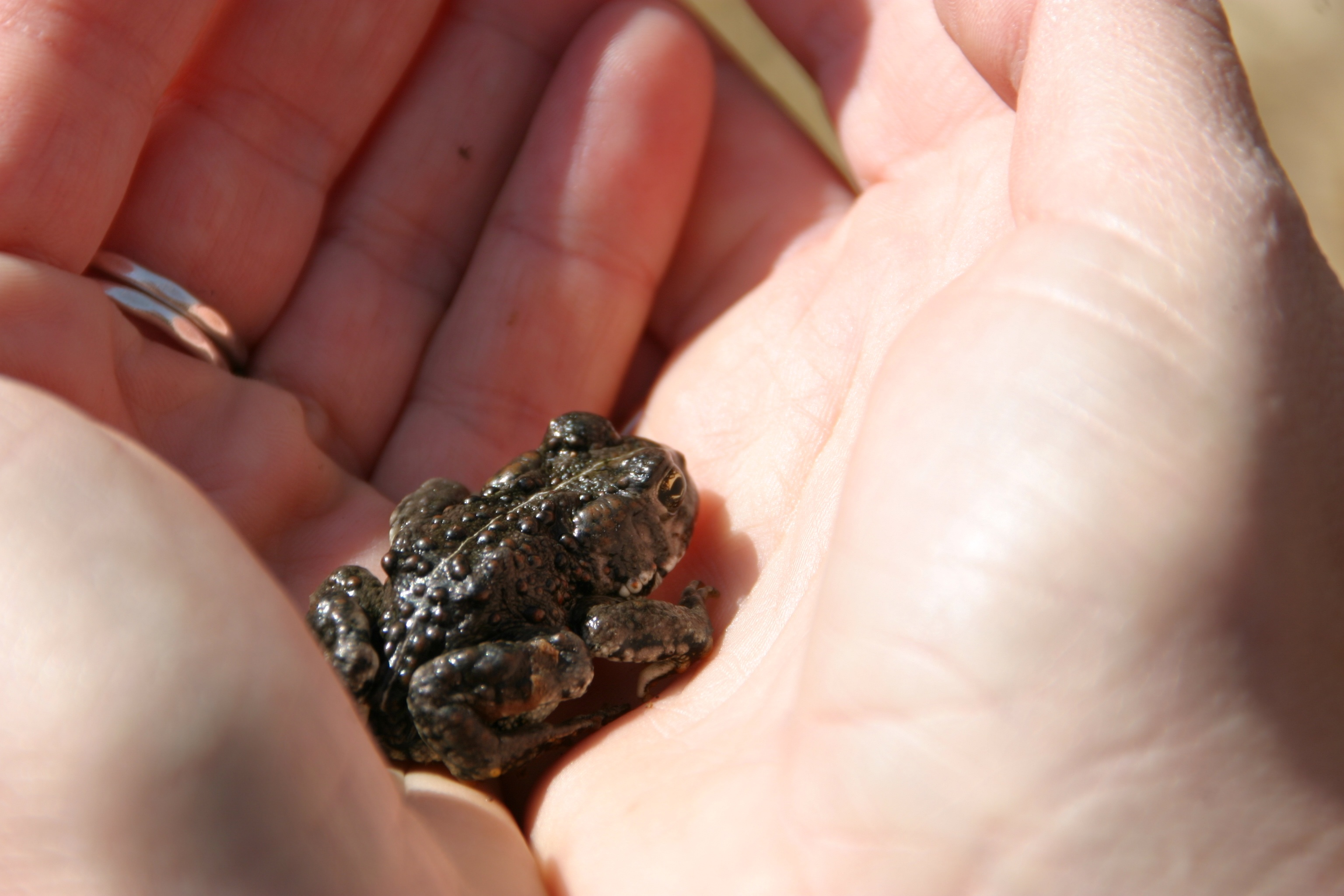

Conservation status
- Critically Endangered (IUCN 3.1)

- Imperiled (NatureServe)

Scientific classification
- Kingdom: Animalia
- Phylum: Chordata
- Class: Amphibia
- Order: Anura
- Family: Bufonidae
- Genus: Anaxyrus
- Species: A. nelsoni

Binomial name
- Anaxyrus nelsoni (Stejneger, 1893)

Synonyms
- Bufo boreas ssp. nelsoni Stejneger, 1893; Bufo nelsoni Stejneger, 1893

= Amargosa toad =

Species of amphibian

The Amargosa toad (Anaxyrus nelsoni) is a species of toad in the family Bufonidae. It was at one time considered to be a subspecies of the western toad. It is threatened by habitat loss and is classified by the IUCN as being critically endangered.

== Etymology ==
The specific name nelsoni honors Edward William Nelson, an American naturalist and ethnologist.

== Distribution and habitat ==
The Amargosa toad is endemic to the Oasis Valley in the Amargosa Desert in Nye County, Nevada, United States. Its natural habitat is along a 10 miles (16 km) stretch of the Amargosa River in the Oasis Valley between Springdale and Beatty, in tributary springs and in nearby isolated springs. The riverside growth consists of cottonwoods, sedges and cattails and breeding takes place in the springs where there is often little aquatic vegetation.

== Status ==
The International Union for Conservation of Nature has assessed the status of the Amargosa toad as being critically endangered. Factors that adversely affect it include variable amounts of rainfall, the increased use of off-road vehicles, the trampling of grazing animals, dredging operations for flood control and commercial development. Another threat is the introduction of non-native species that prey on it including catfish, crayfish and bullfrogs. The population of the toads is believed to be in decline.

Effective steps are being taken by local citizens, ranchers, and farmers to preserve and restore the Amargosa toad's population in the area, in part to avoid federal intervention through the Endangered Species Act.
