= Springdale, Nevada =

Ghost town in Nevada, United States

Coordinates: 37.030108°N 116.755401°W

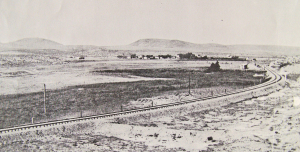
Springdale, Nevada, ca. 1912

Springdale is a privately owned ghost town in Nevada, United States. It is inaccessible to the general public.

== Location ==
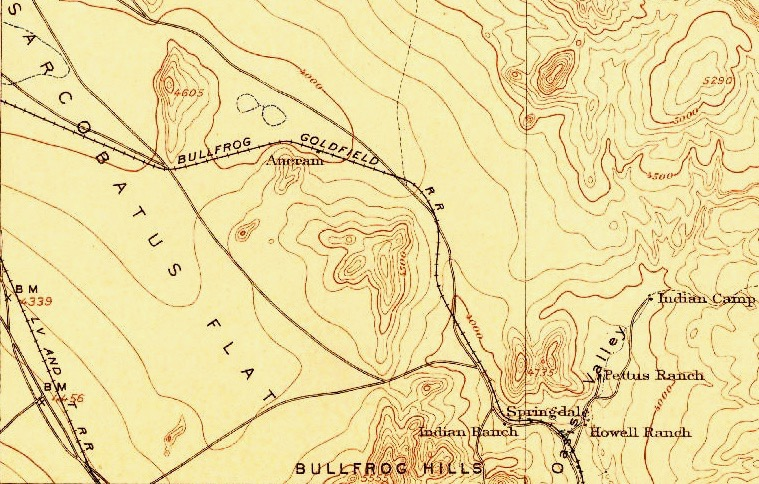
Topographic map of Bullfrog Goldfield Railroad 1908 north of Bullfrog

Springdale lies in Nye County, along the Amargosa River at a crossroad of U.S. Route 95 between Las Vegas and Reno.

The first settlers in the area were Native American Indians. When the first Europeans arrived in the late 1800s, six ranches were built along the Bonanza Trail, making use of the valley's fertile soil. Three were owned by George Davies, Ed Giles and "Panamint Joe" Stuart of the Indian Joe Ranch, which was sold to A. J. Lidwell. One ranch was called Windmill Ranch.

Albert J. "Lucky" Lidwell set up a town around the old Indian Joe Ranch in July 1906. A station of the Bullfrog Goldfield Railroad was opened in May 1907, which was also used by the Tonopah and Tidewater Railroad since 1908. The area was rich in both firewood and water, which were both needed to run steam locomotives. In 1907, the town got its own post office, of course with Lucky Lidwell as postmaster. By that time the town had four saloons, several restaurants, a school, a depot, a sawmill. A fifty-ton mill was used to process ores from the surrounding mines, a Gilds Mall, a hotel, a livery stable provided employment to many workers, who were served by 14 illicit prostitutes in the increasingly attractive red light area.

The Springdale Water & Power Co. began on 7 April 1909 to supply electricity to the town, which had 293 inhabitants in 1910. Springdale was very popular, but its attractiveness declined when the ore mill closed down in 1911. The post office was subsequently relocated to Pioneer on 15 January 1912. The railroad stopped operating in 1928, and the depot was dismantled and relocated to Las Vegas for another use.

Due to the increasing popularity of private cars, U.S. Route 95 was built, along which a Union Oil gas station, one or two repair shops and a junkyard offered their services to motorists. Springdale was just outside of the Air Force's military ranges, where bomber pilots were trained for their service in World War II. Use of extensive areas as bombing ranges limited the nearby population that the town had served.

As of 2017 some of the old buildings still exist. The properties in and around Springdale are owned by a half-dozen locals and are inhabited by four families.
