= Crater Flat =

Volcanic region in Nevada, United States

Coordinates: 36°47′N 116°34′W

- Country: United States
- State: Nevada

Crater Flat is a flat in the Amargosa Desert in Nye County, western Nevada. The flat lies between Yucca Mountain on the east and the Bare Mountains to the west. The south end of the flat borders the Amargosa Valley.

Crater Flat contains five isolated volcanic cones including Black Cone, a basaltic scoria cone. The Lathrop Wells volcanic center lies on the southern margin of the flat just north of US Route 95. The Crater Flat cones vary in age from 1.5 million years for the northern cones to around 80 thousand years for the Lathrop Wells center. The area is part of the Southwest Nevada volcanic field.
