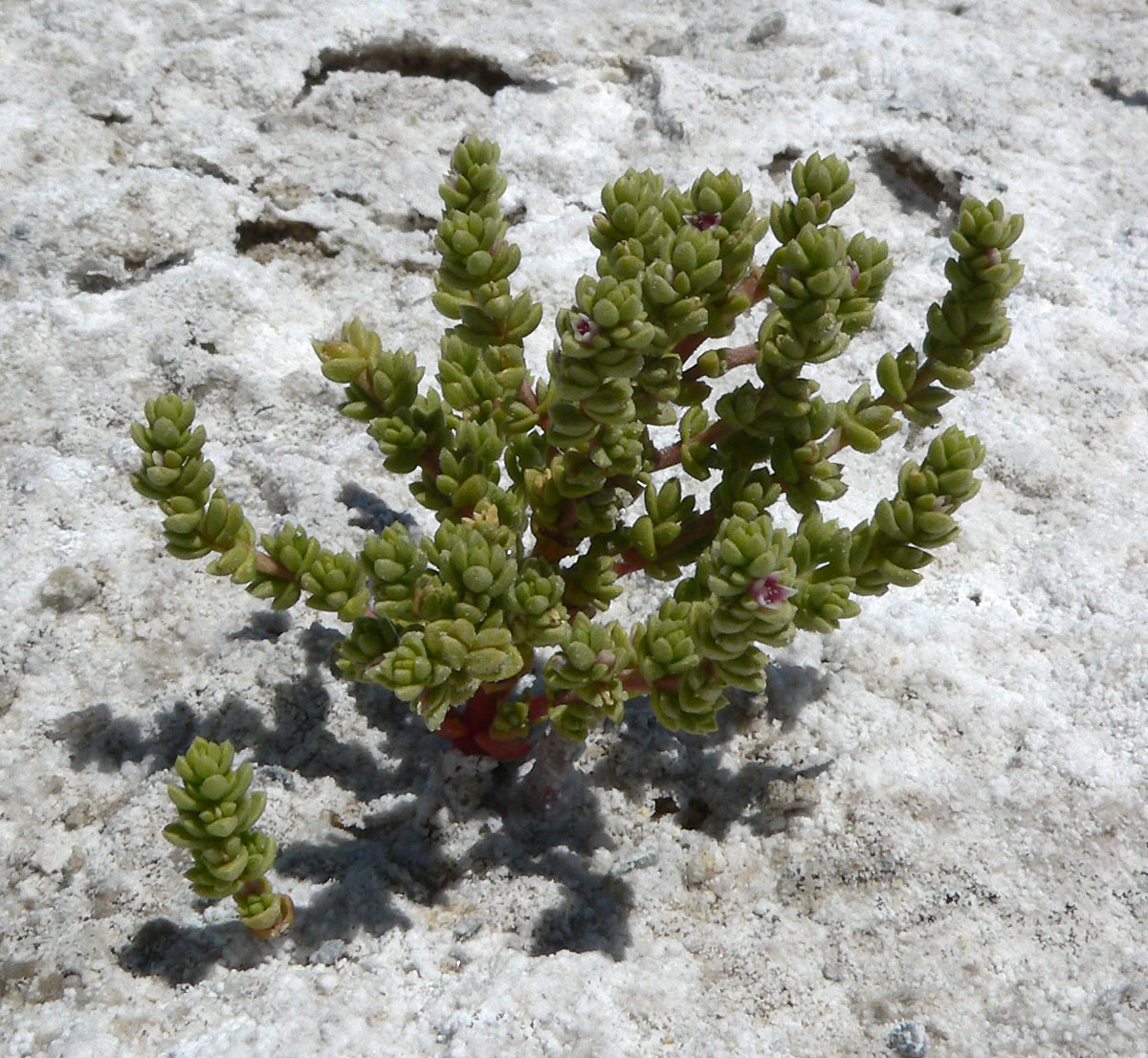

Conservation status
- Endangered (ESA)

- Critically Imperiled (NatureServe)

Scientific classification
- Kingdom: Plantae
- Clade: Tracheophytes
- Clade: Angiosperms
- Clade: Eudicots
- Order: Caryophyllales
- Family: Amaranthaceae
- Genus: Nitrophila
- Species: N. mohavensis

Binomial name
- Nitrophila mohavensis Munz & Roos

= Nitrophila mohavensis =

Species of flowering plant

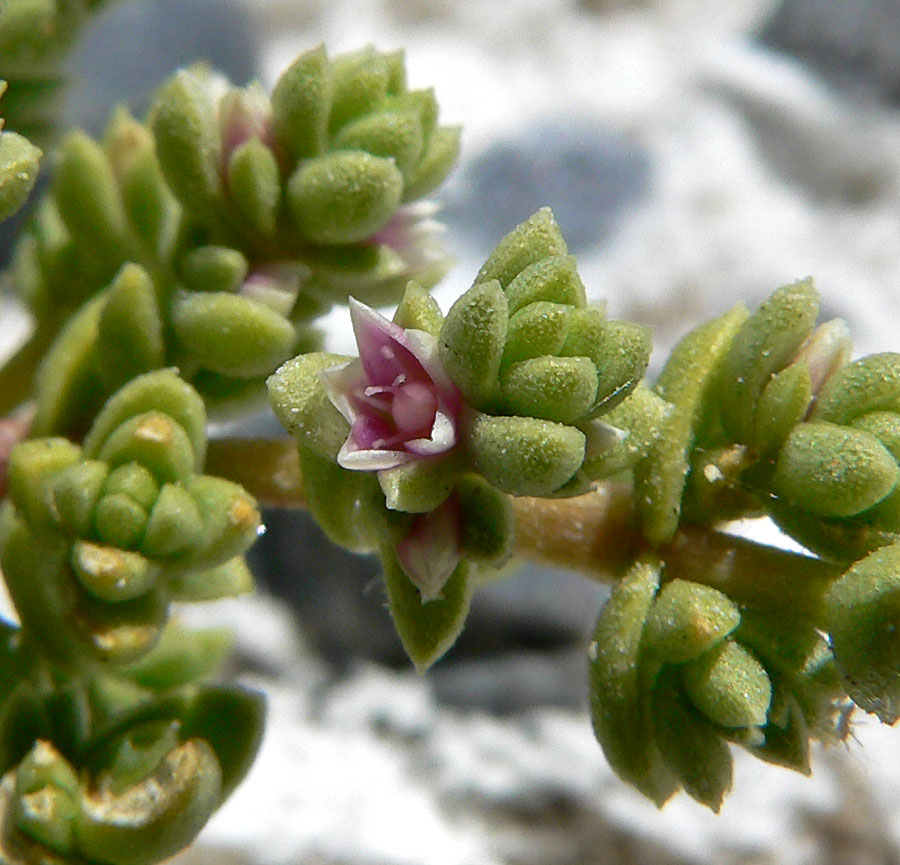
Nitrophila mohavensis in flower.

Nitrophila mohavensis is a rare species of flowering plant in the family Amaranthaceae known by the common name Amargosa niterwort. It is endemic to Nye County in southwestern Nevada and Inyo County, in eastern California.

== Distribution and habitat ==
Nitrophila mohavensis is endemic to the Amargosa Desert, straddling the border of California and Nevada east of Death Valley and near Death Valley National Park. There are three occurrences known on the Nevada side and fewer than five occurrences in California.

The plant grows only in alkaline salt pans made up of moist and drying, salt-encrusted clay soils surrounded by other halophytes, such as Atriplex confertifolia and Cleomella brevipes.

== Description ==
Nitrophila mohavensis, the Amargosa niterwort, is a petite rhizomatous perennial herb growing no more than about 10 centimeters tall. It produces erect branches, often in pairs, covered in fleshy oval-shaped green leaves 3 or 4 millimeters long.

The inflorescence is a solitary flower or cluster of a few flowers emerging from between the leaves. The flower lacks petals but has pink petallike sepals which fade white with age.

== Conservation ==
Nitrophila mohavensis is a federally listed endangered species and is listed as a critically endangered and fully protected species by the State of Nevada. Its range is restricted and highly localized, making it vulnerable to severe losses or extinction in a single event.

The plant only occurs within and around the remnants of Carson Slough in the Ash Meadows area, including within Ash Meadows National Wildlife Refuge which is a protected area but is still affected by alterations in the hydrology of the landscape. The plant relies on saturation of its soil by a high water table, and the main threat to its existence is the pumping of groundwater. Other threats include potassium and zeolite mining in the area and occasional illegal off-road vehicle use.

== See also ==
- Ash Meadows National Wildlife Refuge
- Amargosa River
- Amargosa Valley
