= Bullfrog Hills =

Mountain range in Nevada, United States

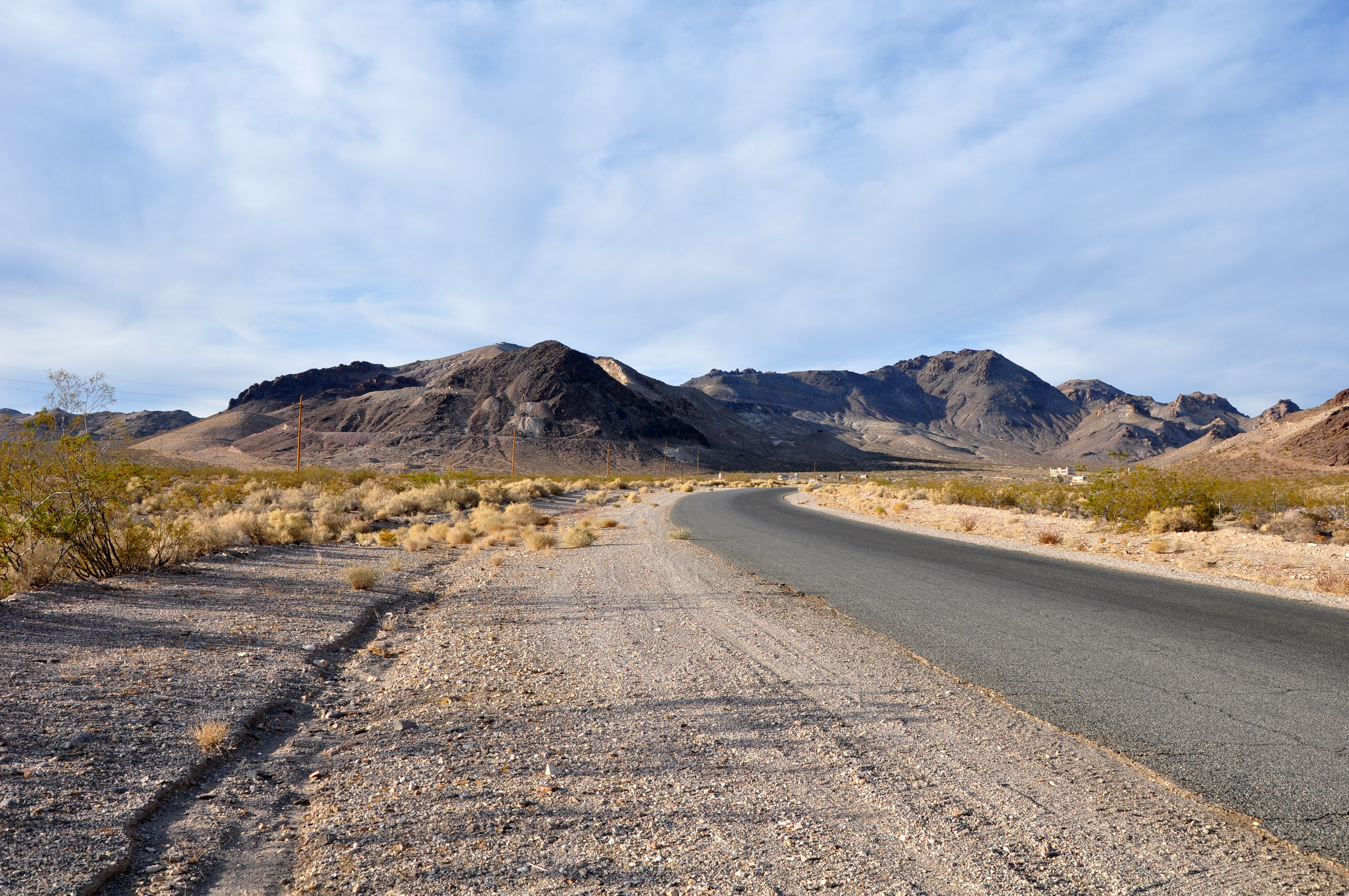
- Bullfrog Hills at Rhyolite, Nevada

Highest point
- Peak: Sawtooth Mountain
- Elevation: 6,005 ft (1,830 m)

Geography
- Location within Nevada
- Country: United States
- State: Nevada
- District: Nye County
- Settlements: Beatty and Rhyolite
- Range coordinates: 36°57′31.797″N 116°49′58.222″W
- Borders on: Pahute Mesa, Bare Mountains, Amargosa Desert, Sarcobatus Flat and Amargosa Valley
- Topo map: USGS Beatty

The Bullfrog Hills are a small mountain range of the Mojave Desert in southern Nye County, southwestern Nevada. Bullfrog Hills was so named from a fancied resemblance of its ore to the color of a bullfrog.

== Geography ==
To the range's east are Beatty, the Amargosa River, US Route 95, and the Bare Mountains. The Amargosa Valley is on the southeast and on the south with Nevada State Route 374. To the southwest lies the Amargosa Range along the Nevada–California border. Death Valley National Park and the Grapevine Mountains are to the west. Pahute Mesa is to the north, beyond Sarcobatus Flat and US Route 95.

The highpoint of the range is Sawtooth Mountain, at 6,005 feet (1,830 m) in elevation.

The hill's southern flanks are part of the Amargosa Desert, a sub-ecoregion of the Mojave Desert and Great Basin Desert ecoregions.

== Mining history ==
The historic Rhyolite mining district and town was in the Bullfrog Hills. The Tonopah and Tidewater Railroad crossed the hills to its Rhyolite Station via the Bullfrog Goldfield Railroad.

The Bullfrog mining district was located along the south margin of the hills. The original Bullfrog Mine is located on the south flank of Bullfrog Mountain to the west of Rhyolite, and now just inside the northeast corner of the Death Valley National Park.

== See also ==
- Amargosa Toad
- Amargosa Desert topics
