= Ibex Hills =

Mountain range in California

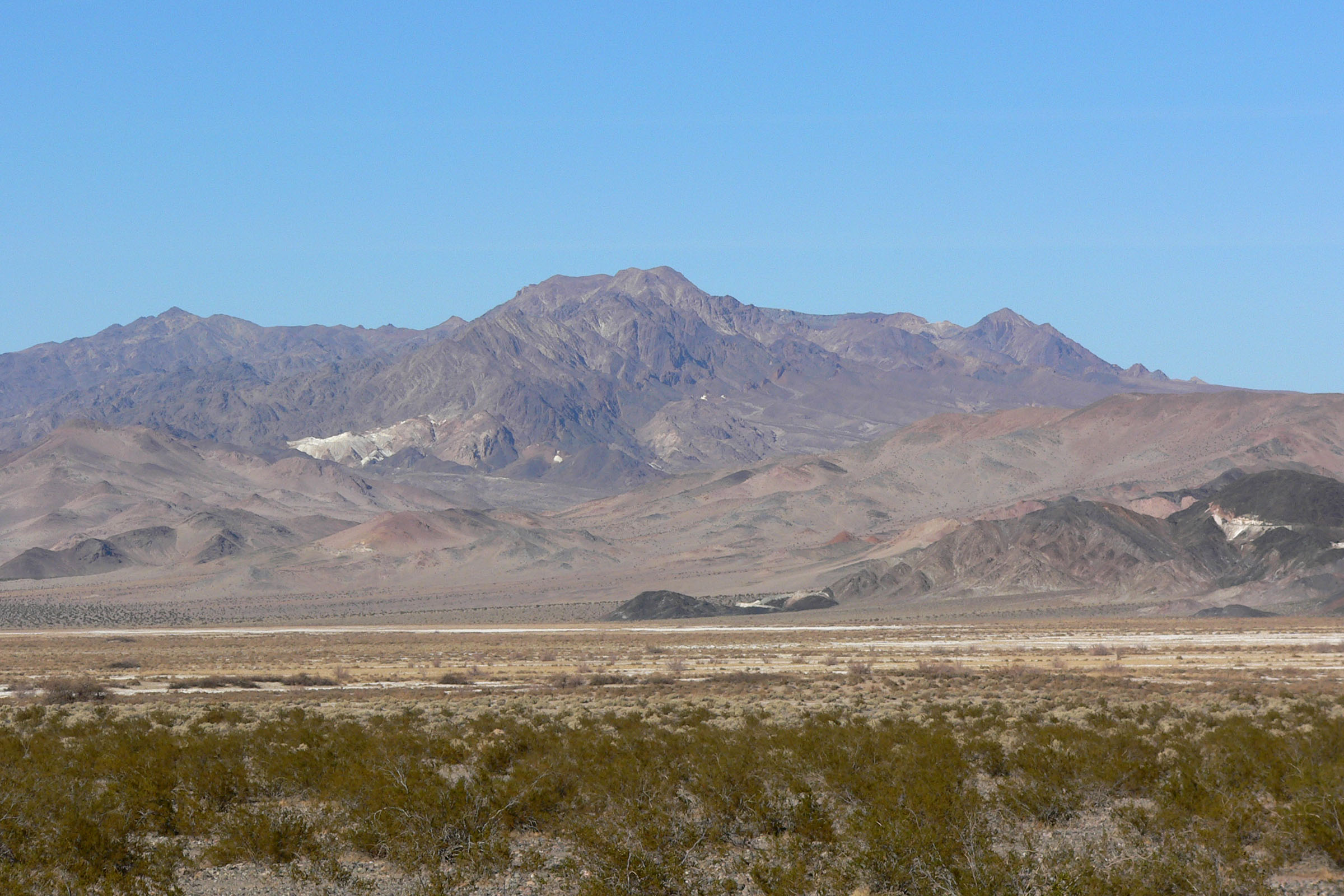

Highest point
- Elevation: 1,263 m (4,144 ft)

Geography
- Location within California
- Country: United States
- State: California
- District: Inyo County
- Range coordinates: 35°51′53.868″N 116°24′48.108″W
- Topo map(s): USGS Ibex Spring, Old Ibex Pass

The Ibex Hills are a mountain range in Inyo County and San Bernardino County, California. The highest elevation is 3747 feet. The southern hills are in the southeastern corner of Death Valley National Park. The northern hills, east of the park, are in the Ibex Wilderness, managed by the Bureau of Land Management.
