= Beatty Airport =

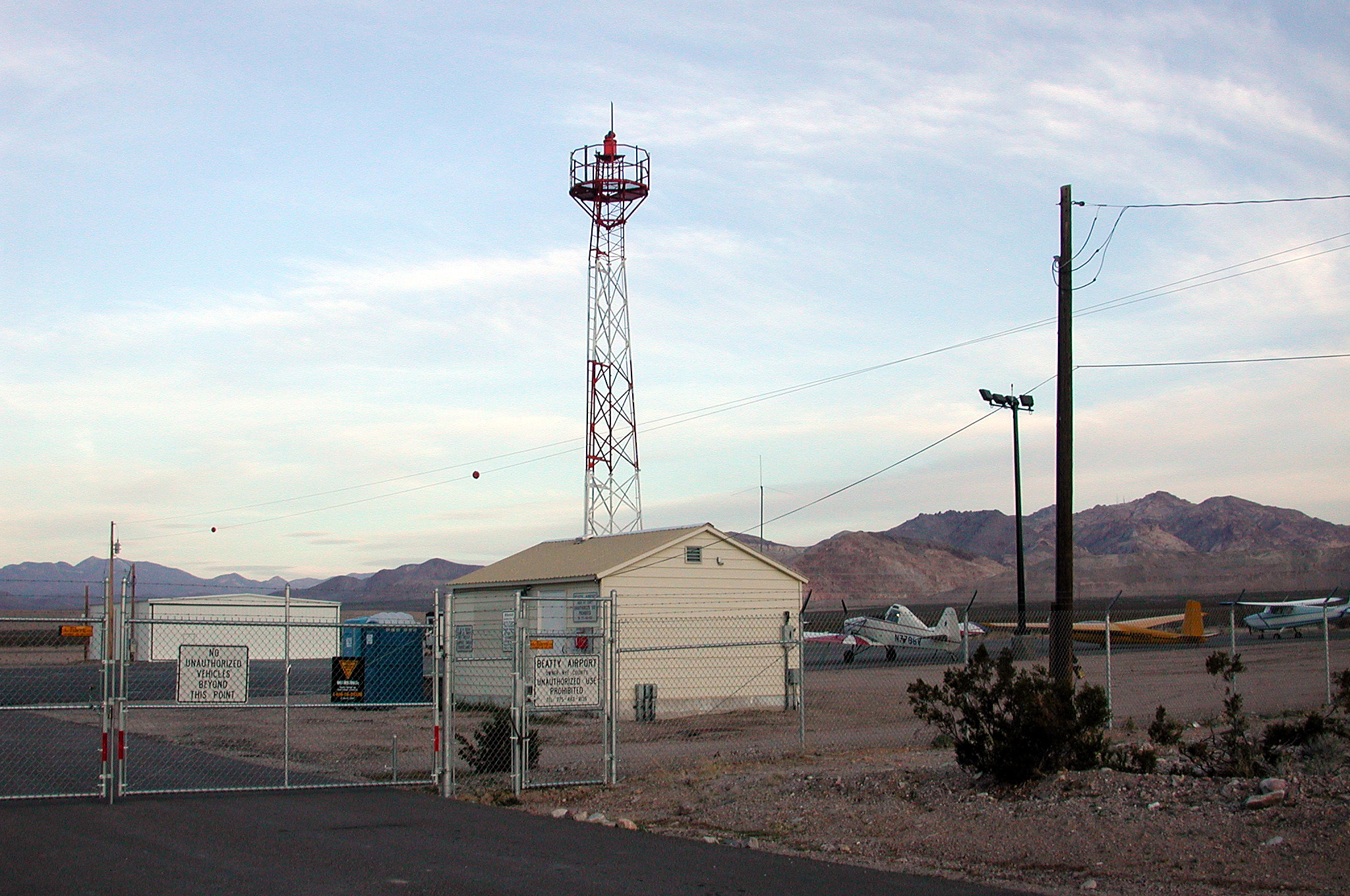
- View from the entrance gate
- IATA: BTY; ICAO: KBTY; FAA LID: BTY

Summary
- Airport type: Public
- Owner: Nye County
- Serves: Beatty, Nevada
- Elevation AMSL: 3,169 ft (966 m)
- Coordinates: 36°51′40″N 116°47′13″W
- Interactive map of Beatty Airport

Runways
Direction	Length		Surface
Direction	ft	m	Surface
16/34	5,615	1,711	Asphalt

Statistics (2023)
- Aircraft operations (year ending 6/29/2023): 2,265
- Based aircraft: 8
- Source: Federal Aviation Administration

Beatty Airport (IATA: BTY, ICAO: KBTY, FAA LID: BTY) is a county-owned public-use airport located three nautical miles (6 km) southwest of the central business district of Beatty, a town in Nye County, Nevada, United States.

== Facilities and aircraft ==
Beatty Airport covers an area of 440 acres (180 ha) at an elevation of 3,169 feet (966 m) above mean sea level. It has one runway designated 16/34 with an asphalt surface measuring 5,615 by 60 feet (1,711 x 18 m).

For the 12-month period ending June 29, 2023, the airport had 2,265 aircraft operations, an average of 43 per month: 80% general aviation, 4% air taxi, and 16% military. At that time there were 8 aircraft based at this airport: 5 single-engine, 1 multi-engine and 2 glider.

== See also ==
- List of airports in Nevada
