= Yucca Mountain =

Mountain in Nevada, United States

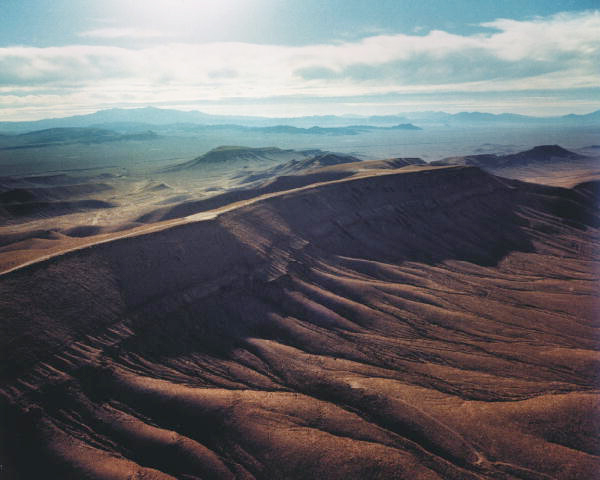
- Yucca Mountain

Highest point
- Elevation: 6,707 ft (2,044 m) NAVD 88
- Prominence: 1,333 ft (406 m)
- Coordinates: 36°56′25″N 116°29′06″W

Geography
- Location within Nevada
- Location: Nye County, Nevada, U.S.
- Topo map: USGS Topopah Spring

Geology
- Mountain type(s): Caldera, cinder cones
- Last eruption: 80,000 years ago

Yucca Mountain is a mountain in Nevada, near its border with California, approximately 100 miles (160 km) northwest of Las Vegas. Located in the Great Basin, Yucca Mountain is east of the Amargosa Desert, south of the Nevada Test and Training Range and in the Nevada National Security Site. It is the site of the Yucca Mountain nuclear waste repository, which is currently identified by US federal law as the nation's spent nuclear waste storage facility. However, while licensure of the site through the Nuclear Regulatory Commission is ongoing, political maneuvering led to the site being de-funded in 2010.

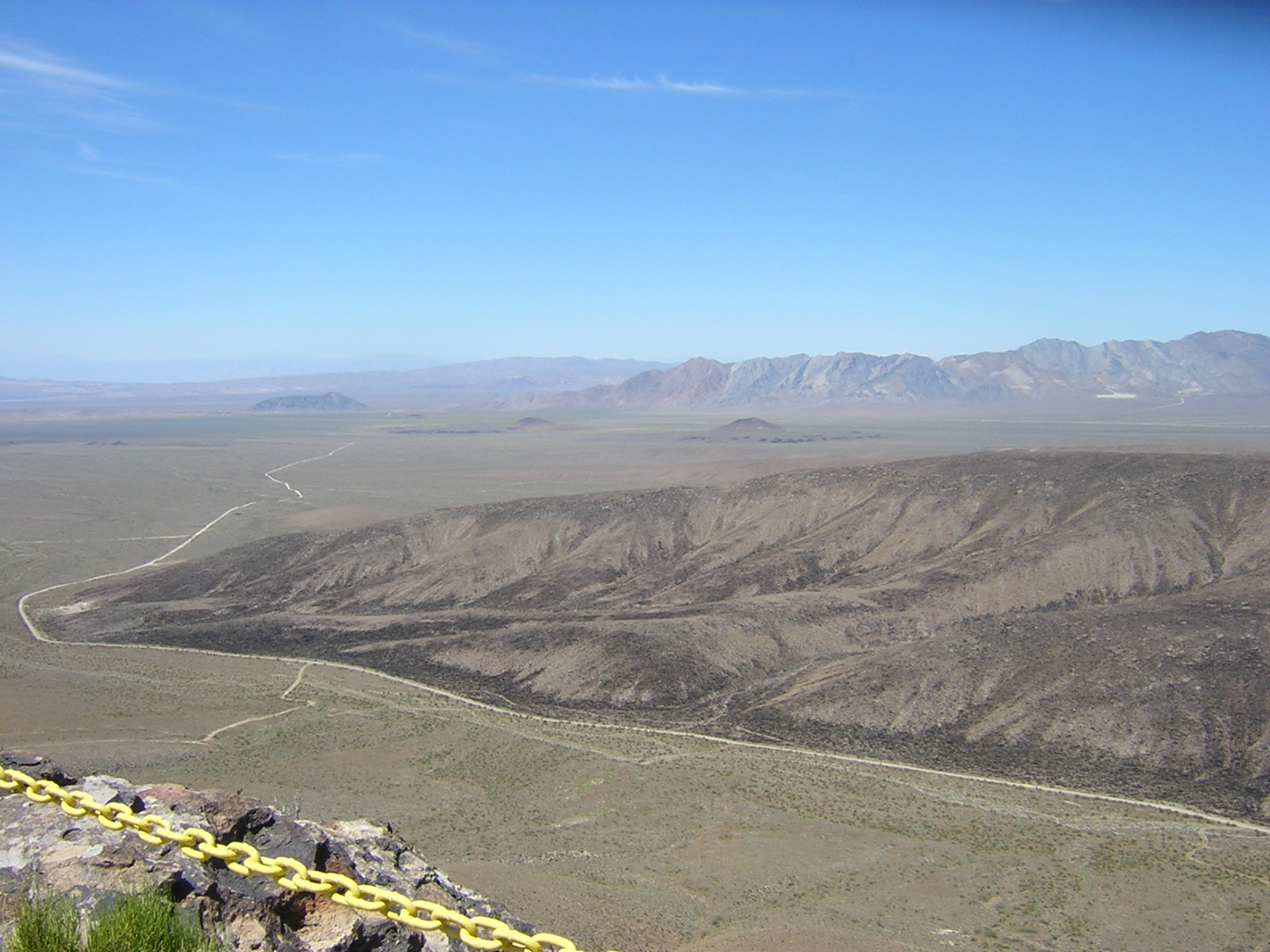
View to the west from the top of Yucca Mountain

== Geology ==
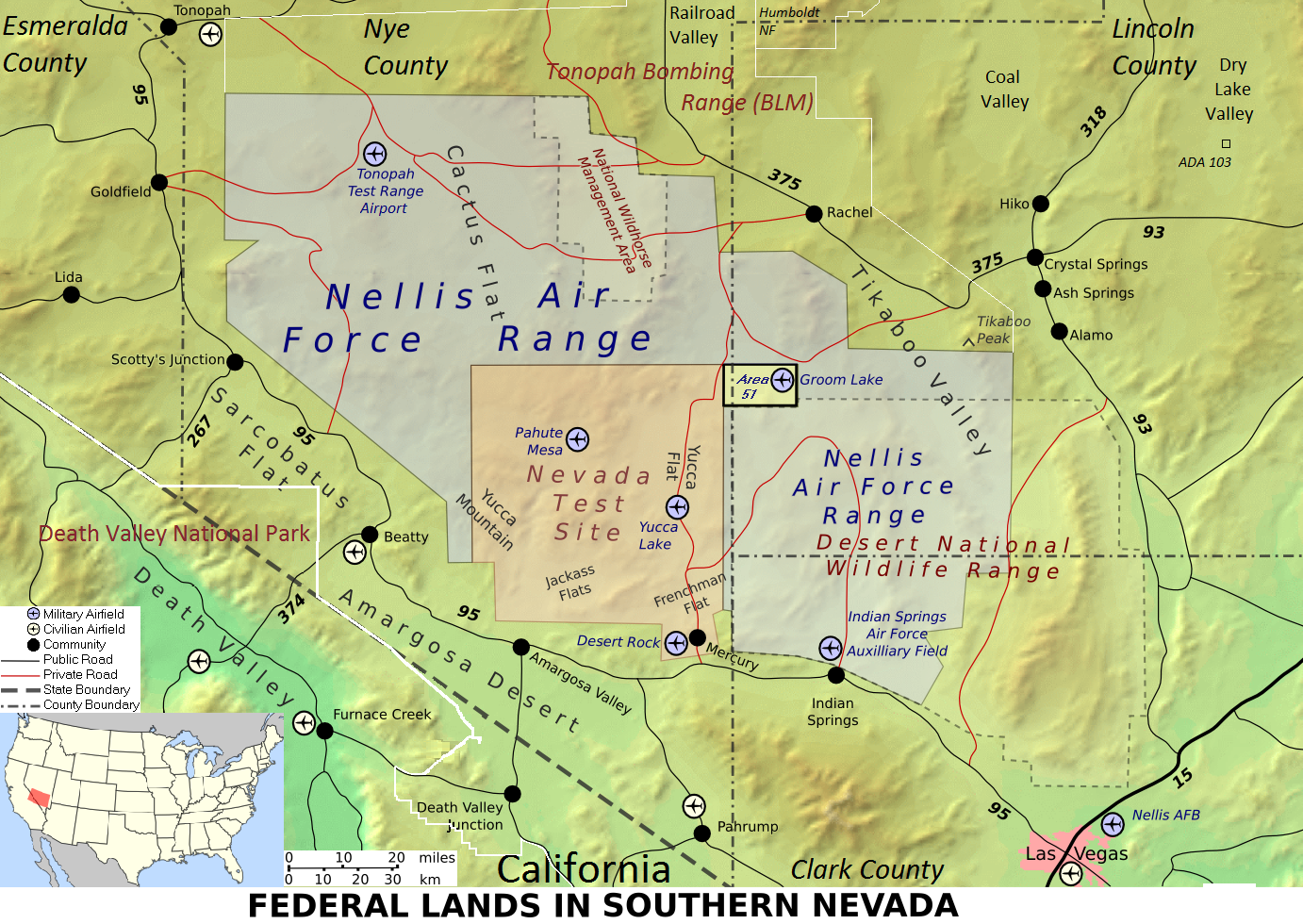
Map of the Location of the Mountain

The formation that makes up Yucca Mountain was created by several large eruptions from a caldera volcano and is composed of alternating layers of ignimbrite (welded tuff), non-welded tuff, and semi-welded tuff. The volcanic units have been tilted along fault lines, thus forming the current ridge line called Yucca Mountain. In addition to these faults, Yucca Mountain is criss-crossed by fractures, many of which formed when the volcanic units cooled.

=== Volcanic history ===
A series of large explosive volcanic eruptions occurred to the north of Yucca Mountain millions of years ago, producing dense clouds of volcanic ash and rock fragments which melted or compressed together to create layers of rock called tuff, forming the mountains and hills of the region. The volcanic eruptions that produced Yucca Mountain ended about 12 million years ago. This explosive volcanism produced almost all (more than 99 percent) of the volcanic material in the Yucca Mountain region.

Several million years ago, a different type of eruption began in the area. These eruptions were smaller and much less explosive. These small eruptions were marked by lava and cinders seeping and sputtering from cones or fissures. The last such small eruption occurred about 80,000 years ago. The remaining volcanic material (less than one percent) in the Yucca Mountain region is a result of these smaller eruptions. Yucca Mountain borders a region known as Crater Flat containing several small cones.

== Cultural history ==
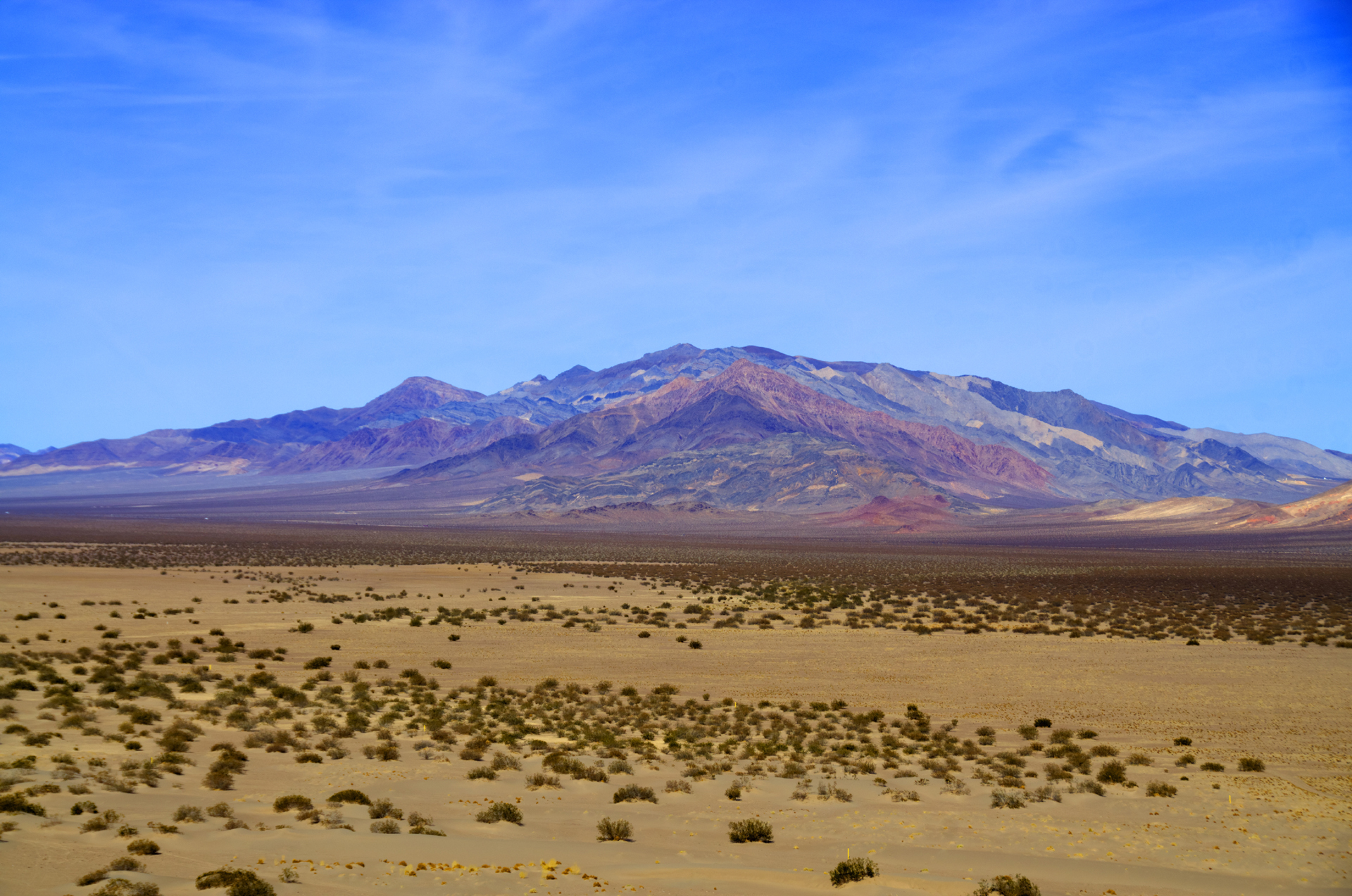
Yucca Range

Yucca Mountain and surrounding lands were central in the lives of the Western Shoshone and Southern Paiute peoples, who shared them for religious ceremonies, resource uses, and social events; Yucca Mountain continues to be considered sacred by the Shoshone people living today.
