= Amargosa Valley =

Valley in Nevada and California, USA

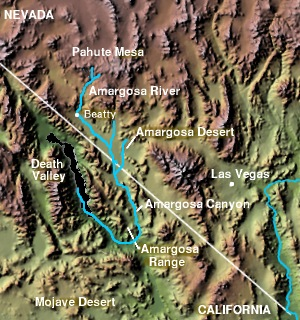
- Course of the Amargosa River, depicting where it flows through the Amargosa Valley before entering the Amargosa Canyon
- Area: 900 sq mi (2,300 km^{2})

Geography
- Location: United States, Nevada
- Coordinates: 36°38′N 116°24′W
- Interactive map of Amargosa Valley

The Amargosa Valley is the valley through which the Amargosa River flows south, in Nye County, southwestern Nevada and Inyo County in the state of California. The south end is alternately called the "Amargosa River Valley'" or the "Tecopa Valley." Its northernmost point is around Beatty, Nevada and southernmost is Tecopa, California, where the Amargosa River enters into the Amargosa Canyon.

== Geography ==
The Amargosa Valley ("the Valley") is located within the Basin and Range Province ("the Province") which is characterized by abrupt changes in elevation, alternating between narrow faulted mountain chains and flat arid valleys or basins. As is typical of the Province, the Valley is long from north to south and narrow from east to west. It lies to the east of Death Valley, separated from it by the Amargosa Range and Funeral Mountains.

The Valley lies within the Mohave Desert region of the Province. The more narrowly bounded Amargosa Desert forms the eastern portion of the Valley.

== History ==
=== Prehistory ===
It is not known when the first humans settled in the Amargosa Desert. Ancient campsites have been found that date back at least 10,000 years, to the end of the last ice age. Recent examination of archaeological remains in the valley implies more extensive use by aboriginal peoples than had been previously estimated. Pottery and other artifacts have been found that date back from approximately 1000 A.D. to even earlier times. During the nineteenth century, two groups of Native Americans occupied the Amargosa Valley: the Southern Paiute and the Western Shoshone. Both were extremely adept at extracting a living from their marginal environment, subsisting on wild plant foods and supplemented by wild game.

=== European exploration ===
The Old Spanish Trail and the later wagon road called the Old Mormon Road or Salt Lake Road, ran through the south end of Amargosa Valley, passing from Resting Springs, east of present-day Tecopa, 7 miles to Willow Spring on the east bank of the canyon of the Amargosa River (then called Saleratus Creek), below Tecopa and above the mouth of China Ranch Wash.

After the Donner Party's disastrous winter of 1847 in the Sierra Nevada mountains, which happened just before the news of California gold became public, a loose group arrived in October 1849 at the Great Salt Lake. They organized under the guidance of a Captain Hunt to head for the San Bernardino–Los Angeles area. The best alternative to risking the Donner route was to try an end run to the south of the Sierras. The Old Spanish Trail had long been used by Indians, traders, explorers, and mountain men as a convenient but rough route, confined to horseback and pack animals, to California. It ran north from Santa Fe to the Salt Lake area then back south along the edge of the mountains to San Diego, and had been used ever since the days of Cabeza De Vaca's journey through the country.

Leaving the Salt Lake area, they were overtaken by another party led by a guide named Captain Smith. He assured them that a more direct route across the southern deserts existed which was quite passable for wagons and showed them a copy of John C. Fremont's map of his explorations. The map had a large portion, then known as "The Great American Desert", left blank with the word "unexplored" across it. On this Smith's friend Barney Ward had drawn in a trail which showed plenty of graze for the animals, and adequate water for all with a description of the clear cool waters of Owens river and Lake Owens. The route would take them north and west of the then unknown Death Valley. Then, over Walker's Pass into California. Unfortunately, this map showed a fictitious mountain range, north of the Old Spanish Trail to Los Angeles and running roughly east–west across central Nevada, and it may have been this non-existent mountain range that contributed to the emigrant's decision to chance leaving the established trail, under the assumption that water, and grass for the oxen, would be easier to locate along the base of the mountains. In later times, the exploration and mapping of Nevada would show that all of the mountain ranges in central Nevada run north–south, directly across the path the Bennett-Arcane Party took.

The party was led by William L. Manly, Rev. James Brier, and Asahel Bennett, all experienced outdoorsmen and farmers out of the Wisconsin farm country who decided to risk it on the assurances that Smith, with the map, would accompany them. Hunt objected, but agreed to stay on as long as he was needed. Soon after their leaving Salt Lake, Smith's group split off as did their guide Hunt as the country got really rough for wagon passage with the main group of less adventurous emigrants and the map. Smith and Hunt both arrived with their parties in San Bernardino after tough but quick journeys around Death Valley. Manly, Brier, and Bennett led straight on into the Amargosa desert. They were followed by another small group, the Wade family party who stayed back one day. Not having to scout or break trail, the Wades had an easy journey compared to the others.

After leaving Ash Meadows, they drove over the Amargosa range, and down into Death Valley through Furnace Creek Wash where they were quickly bogged down on the valley floor. Many of their oxen had died from lack of forage and they were immobilized, as the few remaining animals were starving and were too weak to pull wagons up and over the mountains to the west and south, even if a pass were found. The Wades, not so bad off, quickly turned south and drove themselves out of the valley and on to safety, probably via Wingate Wash. The Manley, Brier, & Bennett party sent Manley and a companion, John Haney Rogers, south out of the valley for help. The Briers made a heroic climb over the Panamints to safety, while the Bennetts waited huddled around their wagons with water but no food. Four weeks later, after an incredible 500 mile round-trip trek across the Mojave Desert to Rancho San Francisco (approx. 30 miles north of Los Angeles), Manly & Rogers returned with some food supplies and a single mule (three other horses had died on the return trip), and the Bennett and Arcane families walked and rode their remaining oxen out of what they named, "Death Valley".

There appears to have been only one death among the '49er emigrants within Death Valley itself, a Capt. Culverwell. Two weeks before the return of Manly and Rogers, a small group had attempted to walk out to the southwest, and Capt. Culverwell, a middle-aged man, was unable to keep up with the younger, stronger men and had turned back to re-join the Bennett/Arcane party. He never made it, and succumbed to dehydration. His body was found by Manly & Rogers only a couple of miles short of the Bennett camp on their return trek from Rancho San Francisco. Two members of another group of emigrants, the Jayhawkers, who had been traveling with the Bennett/Arcane Party, died along the trail west of the Panamint Range; their names are given in Manly's journal as Mr. Fish and Mr. Isham.

While the main motivation of the emigrants was to join the California gold rush, the 1849 rush wasn't nearly as profitable as the later silver rush of the Comstock Lode in Nevada.

== Modern development ==
Amargosa Valley is near the controversial Yucca Mountain Repository, a U.S. Department of Energy (DOE) facility on federal land, designed for the storage of high-level nuclear waste. President George W. Bush signed House Joint Resolution 87 on July 23, 2002, authorizing the DOE to proceed with construction at Yucca Mountain, although the facility was not expected to accept its first shipments of radioactive materials before 2012. The facility's main entrance will be in Amargosa Valley, approximately 14 miles (23 km) south of the storage tunnels. In 2009, President Barack Obama stated that the repository was no longer being considered as a site for the long-term storage of nuclear waste.

Controversy over water rights resulted in 2009 when Solar Millennium, a German company, announced plans to build a solar thermal energy plant in the Amargosa Valley. It would require 20% of the groundwater available in the valley's aquifer. Amargosa Farm Road Solar Project was a proposed 500 megawatt (MW) solar power plant in Nye County, Nevada at 36° 34' 31.52"N, -116° 29' 35.52"W. Originally designed as a concentrating solar power (CSP) project, the project was converted to photovoltaic (PV) technology. Solar Millennium went bankrupt and the project stalled.

A smaller 65MW PV plant on private land was proposed by First Solar in 2013.

== Climate ==
Amargosa Valley has a mild desert climate with very hot summer days and mild winters. The hottest recorded temperature in Amargosa Valley is 118 °F (47.7 °C) on July 9, 2002, and the coldest temperature was 6 °F (−14.4 °C) on December 22, 1990. Average yearly precipitation is 4.29 inches.

== Transportation ==
The principal highways serving Amargosa Valley are U.S. Route 95 which runs north–south (NE-SW as it passes through Amargosa) connecting Las Vegas and Reno, and State Route 373, which runs north–south connecting Amargosa Valley to Death Valley Junction via California State Route 127.

== Recreation ==
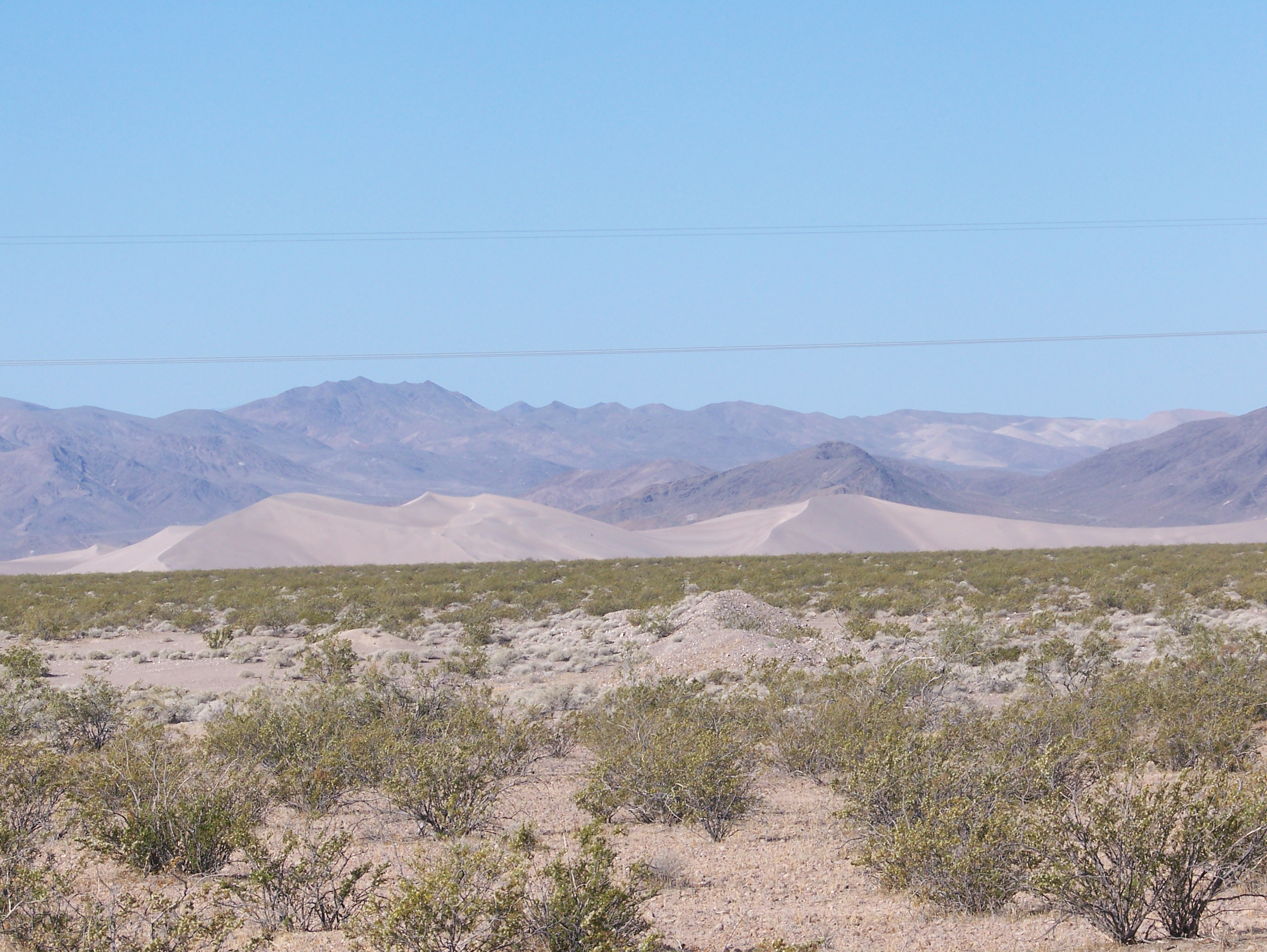
Big Dune

Ash Meadows National Wildlife Refuge features approximately 23,000 acres (93 km^{2}) of spring-fed wetlands and is managed by the United States Fish and Wildlife Service. The refuge provides habitat for at least 24 plants and animals found nowhere else in the world. Four fish (Devil's Hole Pupfish, Amargosa Pupfish, Warm Springs Pupfish, and Ash Meadows Speckled Dace), one insect (Ash Meadows Naucorid), and one plant (Amargosa Niterwort) are currently listed as endangered species. Ash Meadows NWR can be accessed via SR 373 in Amargosa Valley, SR 160 near Crystal, Nevada or from Bell Vista Road west of Pahrump. Entrances to the refuge are marked with road signs.

Big Dune is a formation of sand dunes, cresting approximately 300 feet (91 m) above surrounding terrain. The dune formation and surrounding land is administered by the BLM and is open to motorized and non-motorized recreational uses. Big Dune is accessible from Valley View Road, approximately 2.5 miles (4.0 km) south of U.S. 95.

Tecopa Hot Springs offer several opportunities to soak in private baths fed by the natural hot springs.
