= Amargosa Desert =

Desert in Nevada and California, United States

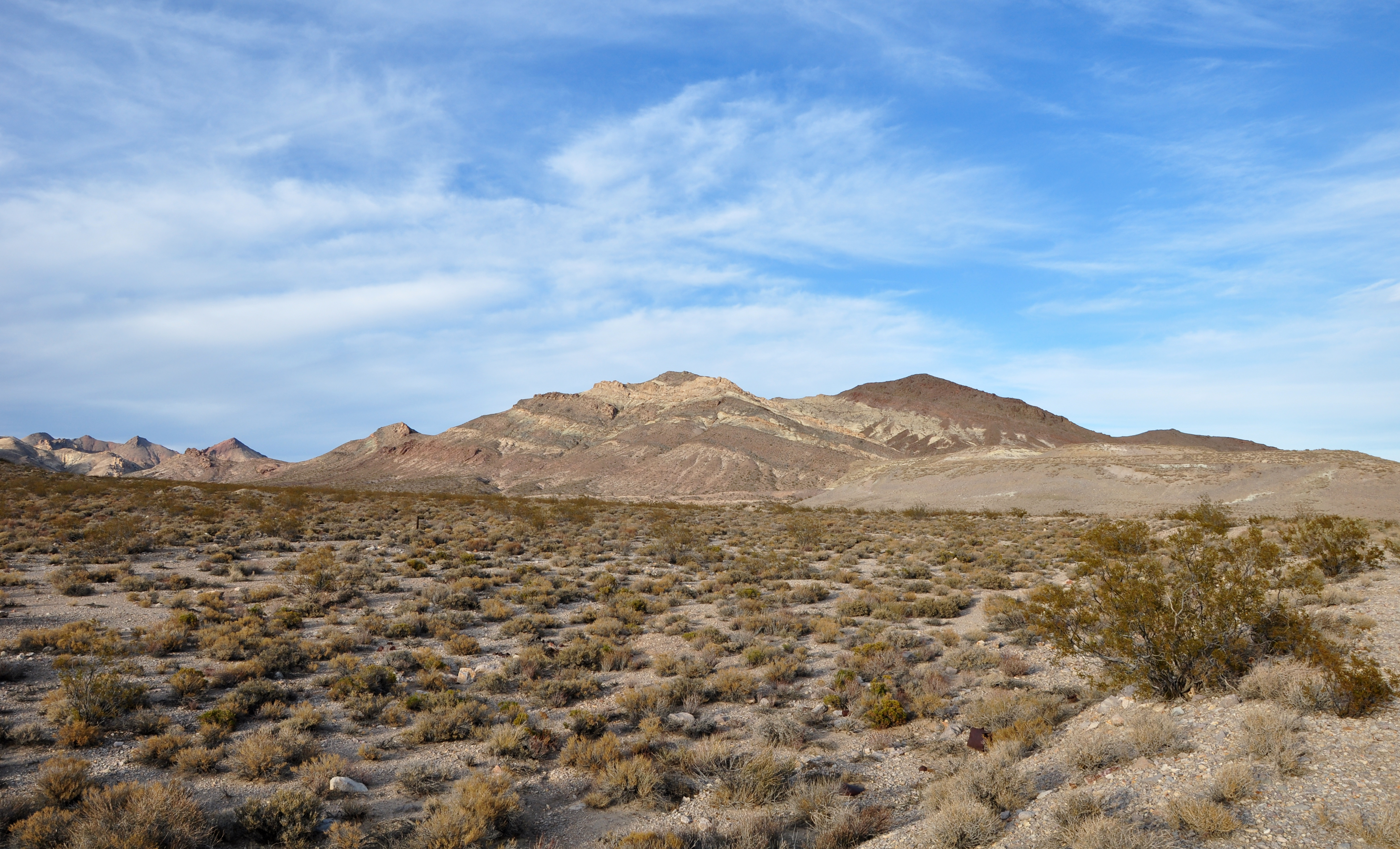
- Amargosa Desert near the Bullfrog Hills

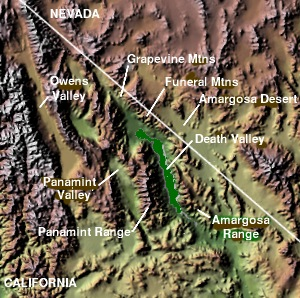
- The Amargosa Desert is near Death Valley
- Floor elevation: 2,411 ft (735 m)
- Area: 2,600 mi^{2} (6,700 km^{2})

Geography
- Country: United States
- State: Nevada and California
- Region: Great Basin
- County: Nye and Inyo
- Borders on: west: Funeral Mountains & Yucca Mountain east: Nellis Air Force Range
- Coordinates: 36.5°N 116.5°W
- River: Amargosa

The Amargosa Desert is located in Nye County in western Nevada, United States, along the California–Nevada border, comprising the northeastern portion of the geographic Amargosa Valley, north of the Ash Meadows National Wildlife Refuge.

The desert is named after the Amargosa River, which was named after the Spanish word for bitter because of the bitter taste of the water.

== Geography ==
The Amargosa Desert lies at an elevation of about 2,600 to 2,750 feet (790 to 840 m), and includes Crater Flat and the community of Amargosa Valley, Nevada, (formerly Lathrop Wells), which lies at the southern end of the desert.

The desert lies between the Funeral Mountains and Death Valley to the west, and Yucca Mountain and the Nellis Air Force Range to the east.

== Natural history ==
The Amargosa Desert is an arid desert habitat and an ecotone between the northern Great Basin and southern Mojave Desert ecosystems and biogeography regions. The seasonal Amargosa River course runs through the desert, with the rare Shoshone pupfish in nearby Amargosa Pupfish Station of the Desert National Wildlife Refuge Complex.

== History ==
=== Prehistory ===
It is not known when the first humans settled in the Amargosa Desert. Ancient campsites have been found that date back at least 10,000 years, to the end of the last ice age. Recent examination of archaeological remains in the valley implies more extensive use by aboriginal peoples than had been previously estimated. Pottery and other artifacts have been found that date back from approximately 1000 A.D. to even earlier times. During the nineteenth century, two groups of Native Americans occupied the Amargosa Valley: the Southern Paiute and the Western Shoshone. Both were extremely adept at extracting a living from their marginal environment, subsisting on wild plant foods and supplemented by wild game.

=== European exploration ===
The first community in the Amargosa Desert was founded circa 1905 as the result of extensive borax mining in the area. In 1907, two railroads started to service the borax, gold, silver, lead and other important mineral mining and processing operations in the surrounding region. The Tonopah and Tidewater Railroad (T and T) ran between Ludlow, California and Gold Center (just south of present-day Beatty), Nevada. The competing Las Vegas and Tonopah Railroad line linked Las Vegas to Goldfield, Nevada. As mining yields and economics changed, the railroads became less viable. The Las Vegas and Tonopah line was abandoned in 1918, and the T and T was shut down on June 14, 1940. By mid-1942, all of the T and T's rails and scrap iron had been salvaged by the U.S. Department of War in support of World War II. Only sections of the graded railroad bed remain; the U.S. Bureau of Land Management (BLM) constructs and maintains hiking trails along some portions of the old railroad bed in California.

Modern development did not begin in the valley until the early 1950s. Electric power, other than that produced by private generators, was not available until 1963. Until the early 1990s growth in Amargosa Valley was minimal. More recently, intense growth in Las Vegas has led many new residents to settle in Amargosa Valley and nearby Pahrump. Amargosa Valley is served by the 775 area code, and most landline phone numbers in the area utilize the 372 exchange, following the format (775) 372-xxxx. The ZIP code is 89020.

Amargosa Valley is near the controversial Yucca Mountain Repository, a U.S. Department of Energy (DOE) facility on federal land, designed for the storage of high-level nuclear waste. President George W. Bush signed House Joint Resolution 87 on July 23, 2002, authorizing the DOE to proceed with construction at Yucca Mountain, although the facility was not expected to accept its first shipments of radioactive materials before 2012. The facility's main entrance will be in Amargosa Valley, approximately 14 miles (23 km) south of the storage tunnels. In 2009, President Barack Obama stated that the repository was no longer being considered as a site for the long-term storage of nuclear waste.

== Solar power plant ==
Amargosa Farm Road Solar Project was a proposed 500-megawatt (MW) solar power plant in Nye County, Nevada at 36° 34' 31.52"N, -116° 29' 35.52"W. Originally designed as a concentrating solar power (CSP) project, the project was converted to photovoltaic (PV) technology. Solar Millennium went bankrupt and the project stalled. A smaller 65MW PV plant on private land was proposed by First Solar in 2013.

== Climate ==
Amargosa Valley has a mild desert climate with very hot summer days and mild winters. The hottest recorded temperature in Amargosa Valley is 118 °F (47.7 °C) on July 9, 2002, and the coldest temperature was 6 °F (−14.4 °C) on December 22, 1990. Average yearly precipitation is 4.29 inches.

== Transportation ==
The principal highways serving Amargosa Valley are U.S. Route 95 which runs north–south (NE-SW as it passes through Amargosa) connecting Las Vegas and Reno, and State Route 373, which runs north–south connecting Amargosa Valley to Death Valley Junction via California State Route 127.

== Recreation ==
Ash Meadows National Wildlife Refuge features approximately 23,000 acres (93 km^{2}) of spring-fed wetlands and is managed by the United States Fish and Wildlife Service. The refuge provides habitat for at least 24 plants and animals found nowhere else in the world. Four fish (Devil's Hole pupfish, Amargosa pupfish, Warm Springs pupfish, and Ash Meadows speckled dace), one insect (Ash Meadows naucorid), and one plant (Amargosa nitewort) are currently listed as endangered species. Ash Meadows NWR can be accessed via SR 373 in Amargosa Valley, SR 160 near Crystal, Nevada or from Bell Vista Road west of Pahrump. Entrances to the refuge are marked with road signs.

Big Dune is a formation of sand dunes, cresting approximately 300 feet (91 m) above surrounding terrain. The dune formation and surrounding land is administered by the BLM and is open to motorized and non-motorized recreational uses. Big Dune is accessible from Valley View Road, approximately 2.5 miles (4.0 km) south of U.S. 95.
