= Amargosa River =

River in Nevada and California, United States

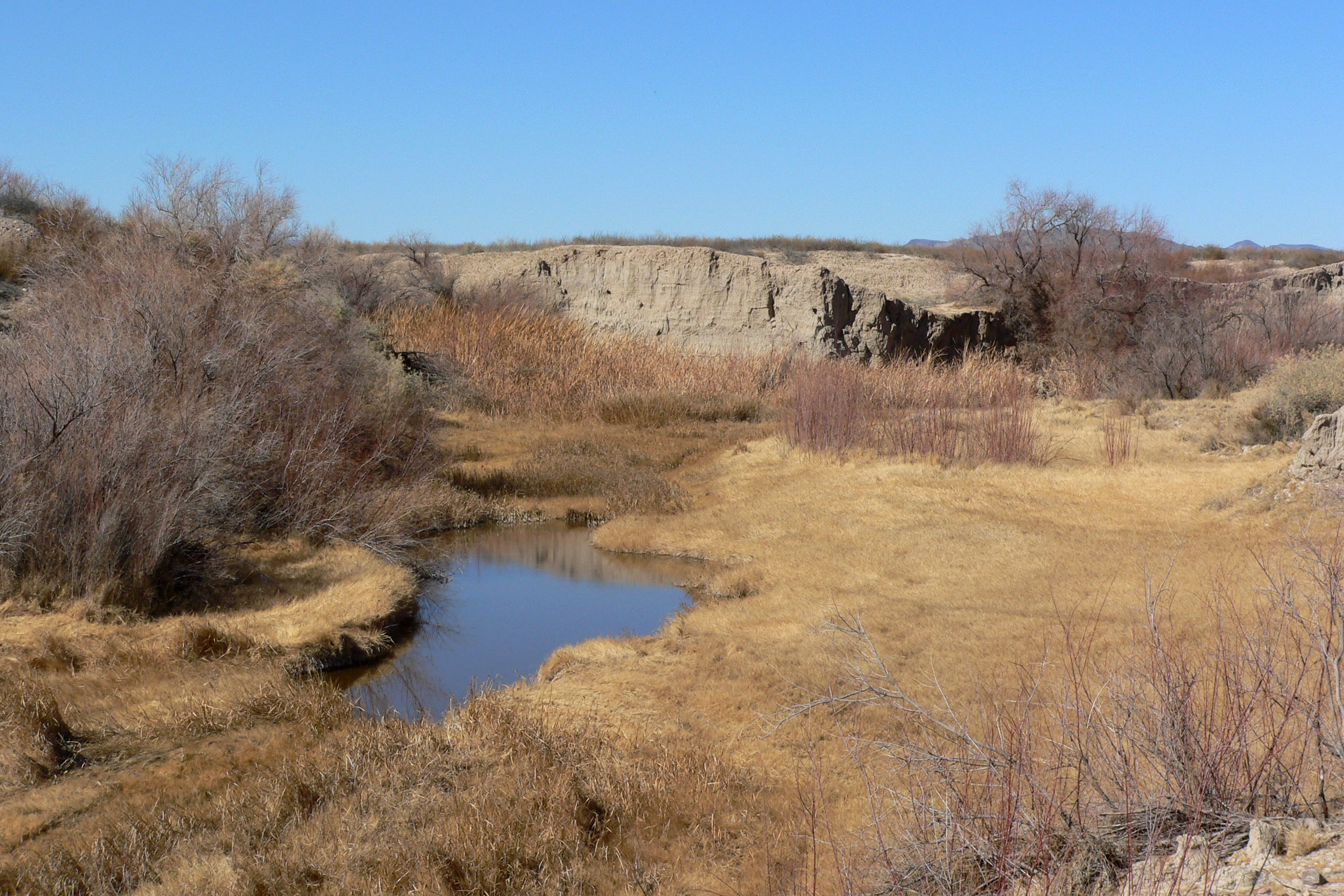
- Amargosa River at Tecopa, California

- Location of the mouth of the Amargosa River in California
- Etymology: Spanish word for "bitter"

Location
- Country: United States
- State: Nevada, California
- County: Nye, San Bernardino, and Inyo

Physical characteristics
- Source: Pahute Mesa
  - location: Oasis Valley, Nye County, Nevada
  - coordinates: 37°04′20″N 116°41′19″W
  - elevation: 3,964 ft (1,208 m)
- Mouth: Death Valley
  - location: Badwater Basin, Inyo County, California
  - coordinates: 36°14′37″N 116°51′24″W
  - elevation: −282 ft (−86 m)
- Length: 185 mi (298 km)
- Basin size: 5,500 sq mi (14,000 km^{2})
- Discharge
  - location: 0.2 miles (0.3 km) west of Tecopa
  - average: 3.8 cu ft/s (0.11 m^{3}/s)
  - minimum: 0 cu ft/s (0 m^{3}/s)
  - maximum: 10,600 cu ft/s (300 m^{3}/s)

National Wild and Scenic River
- Type: Wild, Scenic, Recreational
- Designated: March 30, 2009

The Amargosa River is a waterway, 185 miles (298 km) long, in southern Nevada and eastern California in the United States. The Amargosa River is one out of two rivers located in the California portion of the Mojave Desert with perennial flow. It drains a high desert region, the Amargosa Valley in the Amargosa Desert northwest of Las Vegas, into the Mojave Desert, and finally into Death Valley where it disappears into the ground aquifer. Except for a small portion of its route in the Amargosa Canyon in California and a small portion at Beatty, Nevada, the river flows above ground only after a rare rainstorm washes the region. A 26-mile (42 km) stretch of the river between Shoshone and Dumont Dunes is protected as a National Wild and Scenic River. At the south end of Tecopa Valley the Amargosa River Natural Area protects the habitat.

== Course ==
Except during flash floods that occur after cloudbursts, most of the course of the Amargosa River is dry on the surface. The flow is generally underground except for stretches near Beatty and near Tecopa, California, in the Amargosa Canyon. In the canyon, the river passes through the Amargosa River Natural Area, a region of dense greenery and prolific wildlife made possible by the presence of water.

The river arises at about 3,900 feet (1,200 m) above sea level in Nye County, Nevada, along the southern side of Pahute Mesa in the Nellis Air Force Range. Thirsty Canyon Wash enters at the river's source, and when carrying water, the river flows from there southwest into Oasis Valley. Running parallel to U.S. Route 95 near the Bullfrog Hills to the west (right bank), the river receives Sober-Up Gulch from the right and then Beatty Wash from the left bank.

Another 3 miles (5 km) or so downstream, the river flows through Beatty and turns south-southeast through the Amargosa Narrows into the Amargosa Desert. At this point, Bare Mountain lies to the left, and the Grapevine and Funeral Mountains of the Amargosa Range lie to the right. Downstream of the Narrows, still flowing roughly parallel to Route 95, the river passes Big Dune, which is on the river's left. Shortly after that, it passes the town of Amargosa Valley on the left, leaves Nevada, and enters Inyo County, California. In this stretch, it receives Forty Mile Wash from the left.

Running roughly parallel to California Route 127, the river passes through Death Valley Junction. Shortly after, it receives Carson Slough, which drains Ash Meadows National Wildlife Refuge, from the left. Soon the river passes between the Resting Spring Range to the left and the Greenwater Range to the right before reaching Shoshone. Below Shoshone, the river continues roughly parallel to Route 127 to Tecopa. Downstream of Tecopa, with the Old Spanish Trail, it passes through the Amargosa Canyon between the Sperry Hills on the right and the Dumont Hills on the left, enters San Bernardino County, California, and flows by Dumont Dunes in the northern Mojave Desert. Turning west, the river crosses under Route 127 and enters Death Valley National Park between the south end of the Amargosa Range on the right and the Avawatz Mountains on the left.

Turning northwest and then north, the river re-enters Inyo County, passing between the Owlshead Mountains on the left and the Ibex Hills on the right and receives Confidence Wash and Rhodes Wash, both from the right. In this stretch, the river runs roughly parallel to Harry Wade Road and, further north, to California Route 178 and West Side Road. The river receives Willow Creek from the right and ends in Badwater Basin, about 282 feet (86 m) below sea level, between the Black Mountains on the right and the Panamint Range on the left. Disappearing into the ground, it feeds the aquifer that is the remnant of prehistoric Lake Manly.

=== Discharge ===
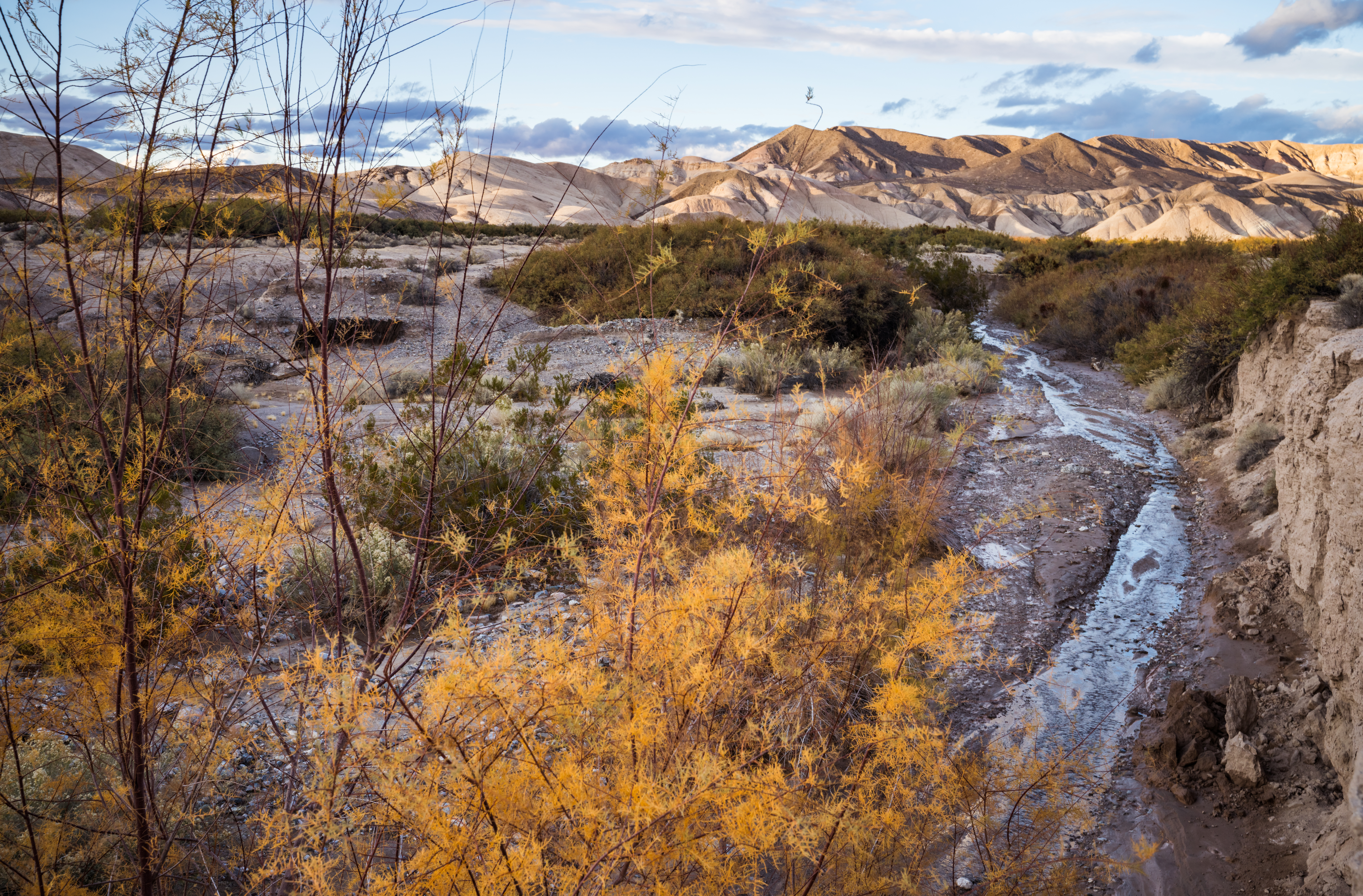
Stream running into Amargosa River.

The United States Geological Survey monitors the flow of the Amargosa River at a gauge station near the Old Spanish Trail Road, 0.2 miles (0.3 km) west of Tecopa. The average flow of the river at this station is 3.80 cubic feet per second (0.11 m^{3}/s). This is from a drainage area of 3,090 square miles (8,000 km^{2}), much of which is noncontributing and all of which represents about 60 percent of the total Amargosa River drainage basin. The maximum flow recorded there was 10,600 cubic feet per second (300 m^{3}/s) on August 16, 1983, and the minimum flow was 0 cubic feet per second (0 m^{3}/s) on some days in some years.

== Wildlife ==
The wildlife within the Amargosa River region, nestled in a portion of the Mojave Desert designated is an "Area of Critical Environmental Concern" according to the Bureau of Land Management (BLM), and is under protection to conserve the diverse plant and animal species listed under the Endangered Species Act. Among these endangered species are the Amargosa vole, Least Bell's Vireo, and Southwestern Willow Flycatcher, recognized at both state and federal levels. Moreover, the state of California acknowledges the yellow-billed cuckoo, Swainson's hawk, and Amargosa niterwort as species under threat. Additionally, two desert fish species, the Amargosa pupfish and Amargosa speckled dace, inhabit these regions and hold the designation of sensitive species according to the BLM.

=== Amargosa River pupfish ===
The Amargosa River pupfish (Cyprinodon nevadensis amargosae) are one of the most notable residents of the Amargosa River. The species seems to be flourishing in the Amargosa Canyon, where its habitat has been safeguarded as a Wild and Scenic River, largely due to the efforts of the Amargosa Conservancy. They primarily reproduce in loose groups, with males displaying minimal aggression and frequently engaging in courtship behavior towards females. However, a subset of males in this population stake out and protect specific breeding territories along the warm, shallow areas of the river. These territorial males exhibit aggression and only occasionally engage in courtship behaviors towards females.

=== Amargosa speckled dace ===
The Amargosa River hosts three separate populations of speckled dace, situated in Oasis Valley near Beatty, Ash Meadows, and the Amargosa Canyon. An interesting revelation concerns the genetic makeup of these fish, indicating an unexpected level of connectivity along the river. Particularly noteworthy is the genetic blend observed in the speckled dace population of the Amargosa Canyon, incorporating traits from both the Oasis Valley and Ash Meadows populations. This suggests that during significant flood events, speckled dace are capable of traversing considerable distances along the Amargosa River, covering nearly 100 miles from Beatty to below Tecopa. These findings propose a level of interconnection among these populations not previously recognized in the pupfish.

== Conservation efforts ==
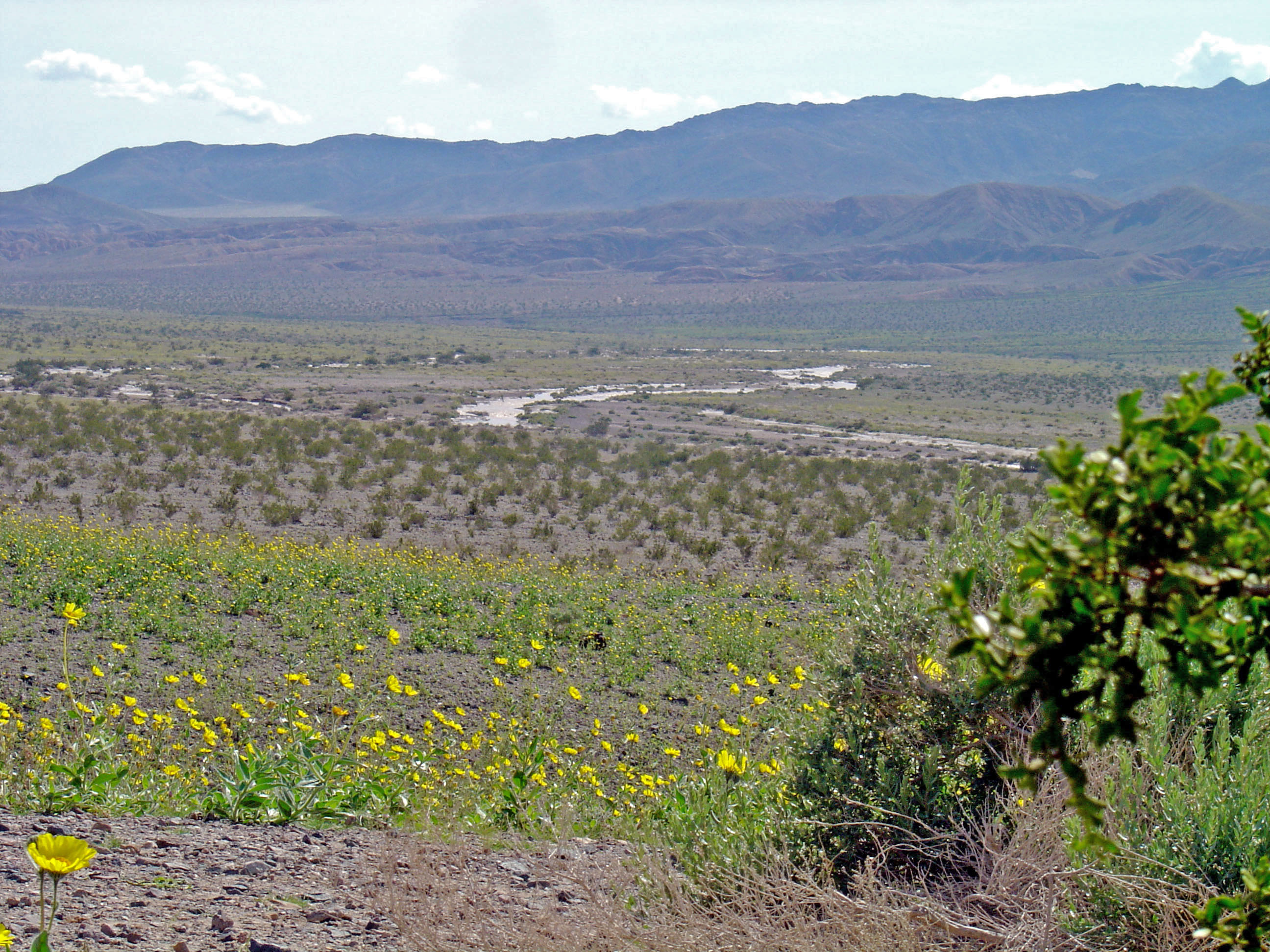
During very wet periods, the Amargosa River can flow at the surface in Death Valley National Park.

== History ==
The name of the river comes from the Spanish word, amargo, for "bitter", probably shortened from agua amargosa, "bitter water". The name was first recorded in 1844 and is believed to refer to the alkaline water. The river is an ancient stream, following an antecedent canyon. Evidence of human habitation along the river goes back more than 10,000 years. In addition to prehistoric Lake Manly in Death Valley, the middle river valley was submerged during the late Pleistocene by prehistoric Lake Tecopa.

The canyon floor along the Amargosa Range has remnants of indigenous habitations that are protected by the Bureau of Land Management. The Old Spanish Trail followed the course of the river in the Amargosa Canyon during the 19th century. From 1907 to 1941, the Tonopah and Tidewater Railroad followed the lower course of the river serving remote Death Valley communities.

In March 2009, as part of the Eastern Sierra and Northern San Gabriel Wild Heritage Act, a 26-mile (42 km) stretch of the river between Shoshone and Dumont Dunes was protected as a Wild and Scenic River.

== See also ==
- List of National Wild and Scenic Rivers
- List of rivers in the Great Basin
