= Nahshon Dion =

American filmmaker, artist and writer

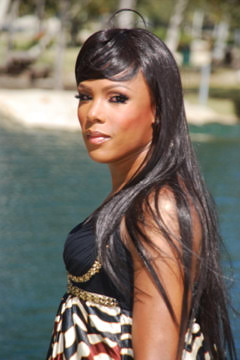
- Dion in 2011
- Born: April 1, 1978 (age 48); Altadena, California, U.S.
- Other names: Nahshon Ratcliff; Nahshon Dion Anderson
- Education: California State University, Los Angeles
- Occupations: Filmmaker, artist, writer, photographer
- Awards: New York State Council on the Arts; 2024; Bronx Council on the Arts; 2023
- Website: nahshondionanderson.com

Nahshon Dion Anderson (born April 1, 1978; previously Nahshon Ratcliff) is an American writer, filmmaker, director, producer, artist, publisher, arts advocate and a community organizer. Her work delves into themes of identity, discrimination, and violence, particularly focusing on marginalized communities. She is recognized for her contributions to creative nonfiction and community activism.

== Early life ==
Dion was born on April 1, 1978, in Altadena, California. She is an African American Louisiana Creole. Her father died at a young age. She was raised by her mother with her siblings. They were part of a Jehovah's Witness community that included her family friend and neighbor, Rodney King. In junior high school, Dion participated in the drama club and was cast in a television commercial for Chuck E. Cheese.

In 1996, she met Tupac Shakur at her senior prom who referred her to his business partner Tracy Robinson at Look Hear Sound & Vision Productions. She interned with them following graduation. While in school, she came out as a gay man. She graduated from John Muir High School. Dion attended California State University, Los Angeles for two semesters.

== Career ==
In 1998, Dion worked as an assistant to actor Stanley Bennett Clay where she helped him publish SBC Magazine focused on gay Black men.

In 2013, Dion relocated to New York City to pursue writing a memoir and nonfiction. She moved to the Bronx in 2013. Dion writes about discrimination, identity, and violence.

In 2019, she began work on a historical and educational film and documentary titled Renewed Life. It is based on her unpublished memoir of her upbringing in Los Angeles County, California and life in the Bronx.

In 2020, Dion was interviewed by writer Sheldon Pearce for Changes: An Oral History of Tupac Simon & Schuster. The book was a New Yorker writer's intimate, revealing account of Tupac Shakur's life and legacy, timed to the fiftieth anniversary of his birth and twenty-fifth anniversary of his death. Pearce, an editor and writer at The New Yorker, interviews dozens who knew Tupac throughout various phases of his life including those who have never before spoken on the record.

From 2018 through 2020, Dion interviewed LGBT writers and allies such as Jeffrey C. Stewart, Amy Heart, Gerrick Kennedy, Amber Dawn, Michael Arceneaux, Renee Bess, Darnell L. Moore, and DeRay McKesson. The articles were published online in the Lambda Literary review.

In September 2021, Dion created a tribute to Tupac, a significant figure in her journey. This was the twenty-fifth anniversary of his untimely death, and she wanted to honor his legacy. She discovered the New York City Department of Cultural Affairs Artist Corps Grant, which aimed to support artists impacted by the COVID-19 pandemic. Out of three thousand applicants, Dion was one of the recipients of $5,000. With this award, she hosted a virtual event featuring Tracy D. Robinson, a producer and director, as well as Tupac's former manager and mentor Leila Steinberg, and other artists and writers. Together, they paid tribute to Tupac through readings from his poetry book The Rose That Grew from Concrete and a discussion on his lasting impact on culture and society through his words, images, and music.

In 2022, Dion started hosting and producing a YouTube show, "TRANSBRATIONS". She interviewed arts administrator Lisa Funderburke Hoffman, entrepreneur Dion Peronneau, poet Elmaz Abinader, writers, Charlie Vazquez, Jenn Baker, Michele Zack, Jacqueline Woodson, Jeffrey C. Stewart, Linda Villarosa, Sarah Schulman, Charles Rice-González, Stanley Bennet Clay, Historian Alison Rose Jefferson, Transgender advocates Diamond Stylz, Ceyenne Doroshow and Gwendolyn Ann Smith, drag queens Harmonica Sunbeam, Kevin Aviance, Jazzmun, filmmaker Pablo Mirrales, California State Secretary Dr. Shirley Weber and Los Angeles Community Garden Council (LACGC) co-founder Al Renner.

== Personal life ==
In early July 1997, at the age of 19, Dion was working as a production assistant when she was shot by a homophobic individual. She was later diagnosed with depression and post-traumatic stress disorder.

Dion started transitioning around 2008 and later came out as a transgender woman.

== Activism ==
In 2024, Nahshon Dion and TRANSBRATIONS Art Collective organized the 25th anniversary of Transgender Day of Remembrance in South Central Los Angeles at ST. John's Community Health, honoring Meraxes Medina and two dozen other victims of transphobia in 2024. The California State Senate acknowledged her for her impact on the community.

== Eaton Fire ==
On January 8, the Eaton Fire in Altadena, CA, destroyed her two previous childhood homes, along with the homes of four family members, numerous friends, and dozens of her former schoolmates. The devastation hit especially hard—in February 2005, she lost her older sister, Shennea, in a fire in Los Angeles.

On January 19, she recorded herself walking in Crotona Park in the Bronx. She discussed the aftermath of the fire and its impact on her community, and published it on YouTube. She traveled to California in late January to comfort family and friends, assist with relief efforts, document the aftermath, and interview residents. This two-week journey marked the beginning of production in California on her documentary film, My Beloved Altadena, the writing of a memoir, and the curating of an anthology titled Our Beloved Altadena: Voices from the Aftermath of the Eaton Canyon Wildfire, with a forward by Ambassador Diane Watson, featuring cover artwork by graphic design artist Dennis Robinson. The collection includes members of Congress, historians, journalists, firefighters, and students. One vital voice included was Dr. Kristen Ochoa, founder of the Chaney Trail Corridor Project. Of the 60 submissions, Ochoa's is among the most significant for its documentation of the fire’s ecological impact and the beauty of the surrounding wilderness.

In September 2025, following reports that CBS was developing a sitcom set in post-fire Altadena with Black-ish creator Kenya Barris and comedian Mike Epps, Dion voiced concerns that if the show were to proceed, it should involve local consultants and direct some of its proceeds back into the community. Dion also noted that storytelling and humor, if handled respectfully, could play a role in the community's healing process.

To commemorate the first anniversary of the fire, on January 20, 2026, Dion curated Under the Stars: Voices of Resilience and Hope Uplifting Our Beloved Altadena at the Altadena Library District, a gathering that honored the 19 people who died, the 22 reported missing, and residents affected by displacement. The program featured poets, writers, artists, and local leaders reflecting on memory, loss, and rebuilding through storytelling, poetry, and visual media.

On September 4, 2026, Dion hosted Our Beloved Altadena: Sweet Sweet Memories, a three hour community gathering at the Eaton Fire Collaborative in Altadena. Created in the aftermath of the Eaton Fire, the event brought residents together through storytelling, music, live singing, poetry, an open mic, and desserts. The program also celebrated September birthdays and recognized a dozen community members as the “Sweetest People in Altadena.” The event was supported by the Department of Angels and Altadena Rising and was part of Dion’s broader work documenting and preserving the experiences and memories of Altadena residents following the fire.

== Honors, awards, and fellowships ==
- 2026 Department of Angels Roots and Rays: A Summer of Care Community Grant
- 2026 Ragdale Artist Residencey
- 2025 Intercultural Leadership Institute (ILI) fellowship
- 2025 New York State Council on the Arts Individual Artist grant
- 2024 Los Angeles Department of Cultural Affairs Public Space Activation Fund Grant: Arts and Social Wellness
- 2024 Trans Justice Funding Project
- 2024 Congresswoman Judy Chu (D-CA 28th District) Certificate of Heroism
- 2024 West Hollywood Rainbow Key Award
- 2024 Rick Chavez Zbur California State Legislature Assembly Certificate of Recognition
- 2023 Trans Justice Funding Project
- 2023 National Arts & Disability Center (NADC) Artist Achievement Award
- 2023 Bronx Recognizes Its Own (BRIO) nonfiction award, Bronx Council on the Arts
- 2023 18th Street Arts Center Artist Residencey
- 2021 New York City Artist Corps Grant
- 2021 Lambda Literary's Emerging Writers' Retreat Fellows & Writers-in-Residence
- 2019 Selected as a Judge in Poetry for Lambda Literary Foundation
- 2016 Lambda Literary Bryn Kelly Scholarship
- 2015 Voices of Our Nation Arts Foundation (VONA)
- 2014 Bronx Recognizes Its Own (BRIO) nonfiction award, Bronx Council on the Arts

== Published works ==
- Bronx Memoir Project: Vol. 10 Bronx Council on the Arts (2026) ISBN 979-8180056665
- Emerge: 2021 Lambda Literary Fellows Anthology. (Vol. 7) Lambda Literary Foundation ISBN 979-8788607412
- Emerge: 2017 Lambda Literary Fellows Anthology. (Vol. 3) Lambda Literary Foundation ISBN 978-1-9853-8436-1
- Emerge: 2016 Lambda Literary Fellows Anthology. (Vol. 2) Lambda Literary Foundation ISBN 978-1-5463-2709-7
- Bronx Memoir Project: Vol. 1 Bronx Council on the Arts (2014) ISBN 978-1500674069

== Articles ==
- Dion, Nahshon (February 11, 2026). "From Prescriptions to Flight: Remembering & Honoring Altadena's Tuskegee Airmen". Los Angeles Sentinel.
- Dion, Nahshon (December 11, 2025). "Called Home to My Beloved Altadena". Land, Food & Freedom Journal.
- Dion, Nahshon (June 18, 2025). "Reconnecting to My Texas Roots and the Legacy of Juneteenth". Los Angeles Sentinel.
- Dion, Nahshon (May 22, 2025). "Loma Alta Park Reopens: Reflections on Its Impact on Altadena Before and After the Eaton Canyon Wildfire". Los Angeles Sentinel.
- Dion, Nahshon (May 8, 2025). "Tribute to Ganther Women from Altadena a Mother's Day Reflection". Los Angeles Sentinel.
- Dion, Nahshon (April 28, 2025). "Altadena's Meadows: A Nostalgic Journey Through Family, Nature, and Resilience". Pasadena Magazine..
- Dion, Nahshon (April 16, 2025). "Honoring Earth Day, Every Day". Los Angeles Sentinel.
- Dion, Nahshon (March 5, 2025). "There is Still Hope, We Will Recover, We Will Rebuild". Los Angeles Sentinel.
- Dion, Nahshon (2025-02-26). "When Everybody Joins Together For a Truly Righteous Cause Sometimes Good Things Happen". Pasadena Now..
- Dion, Nahshon (2025-02-13). "Black History in Altadena has been Erased, and I'm on a Mission to Sift Through the Embers and Ashes to Reclaim It". Los Angeles Sentinel..
- Dion, Nahshon (2025-01-28). "My Beloved Altadena". Pasadena Now..
