= Bullfrog, Nevada =

- Ghost town
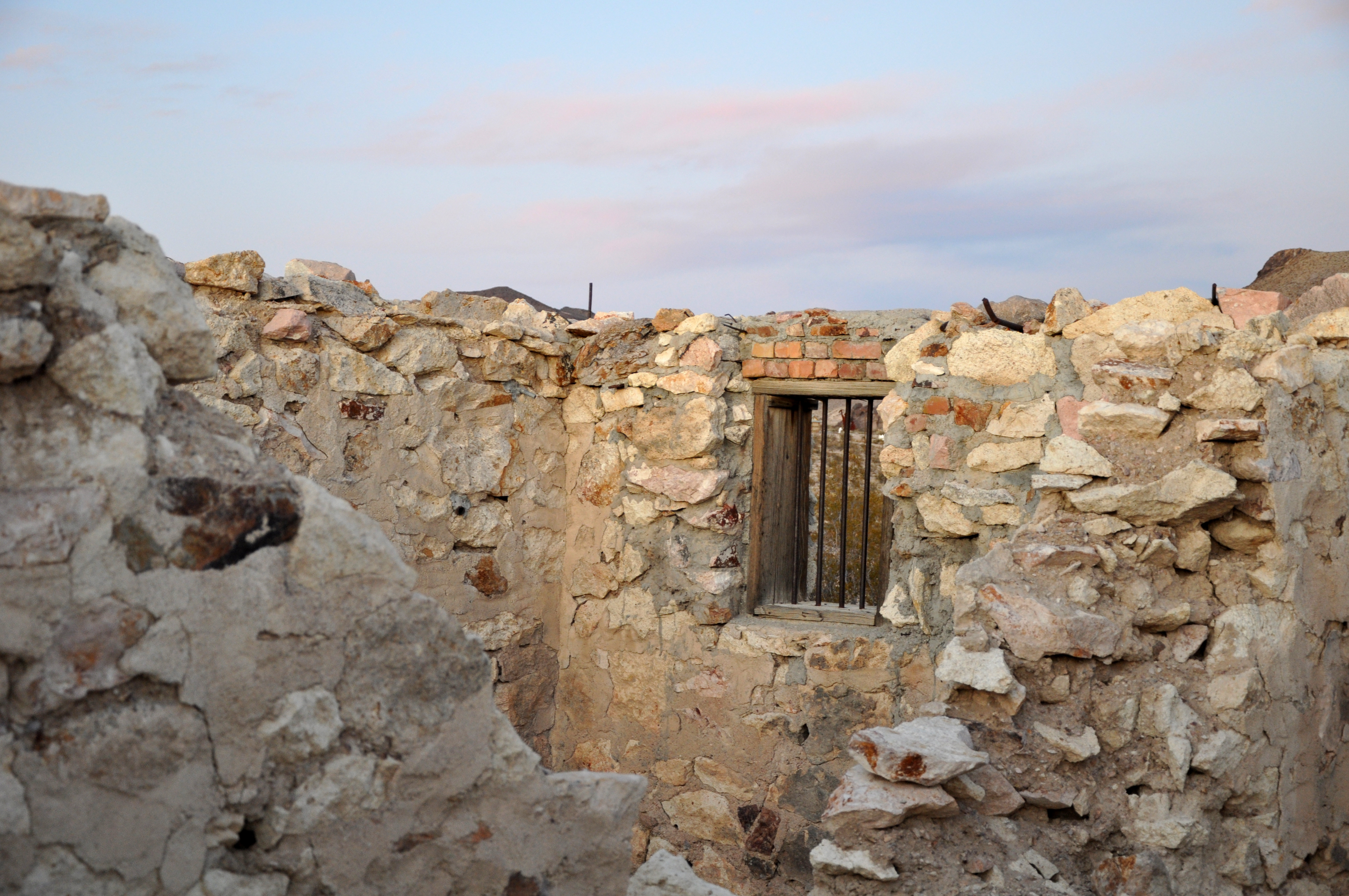
- Ruins of the Bullfrog Jail

- Location within Nevada
- Coordinates: 36°53′25″N 116°50′01″W
- Country: United States
- State: Nevada
- County: Nye
- Established: 1904; 122 years ago
- Elevation: 3,560 ft (1,090 m)
- Time zone: UTC-8 (Pacific (PST))
  - Summer (DST): PDT (UTC-7)

Bullfrog is a ghost town in Nye County, in the U.S. state of Nevada. It is located at the north end of the Amargosa Desert about 4 miles (6.4 km) west of Beatty. Less than 1 mile (1.6 km) north of Bullfrog are the Bullfrog Hills and the ghost town of Rhyolite. The two ghost towns are about 120 miles (190 km) northwest of Las Vegas, 60 miles (97 km) south of Goldfield, and 90 miles (140 km) south of Tonopah.

To the west, roughly 5 miles (8.0 km) from Bullfrog, the Funeral and Grapevine Mountains of the Amargosa Range rise between the Amargosa Desert in Nevada and Death Valley in California.

Bullfrog is near the Goldwell Open Air Museum and its Red Barn Art Center. The Bullfrog jail, the barn, the museum's information center and its outdoor sculptures are located along a spur road leading from State Route 374 to Rhyolite.

== History ==
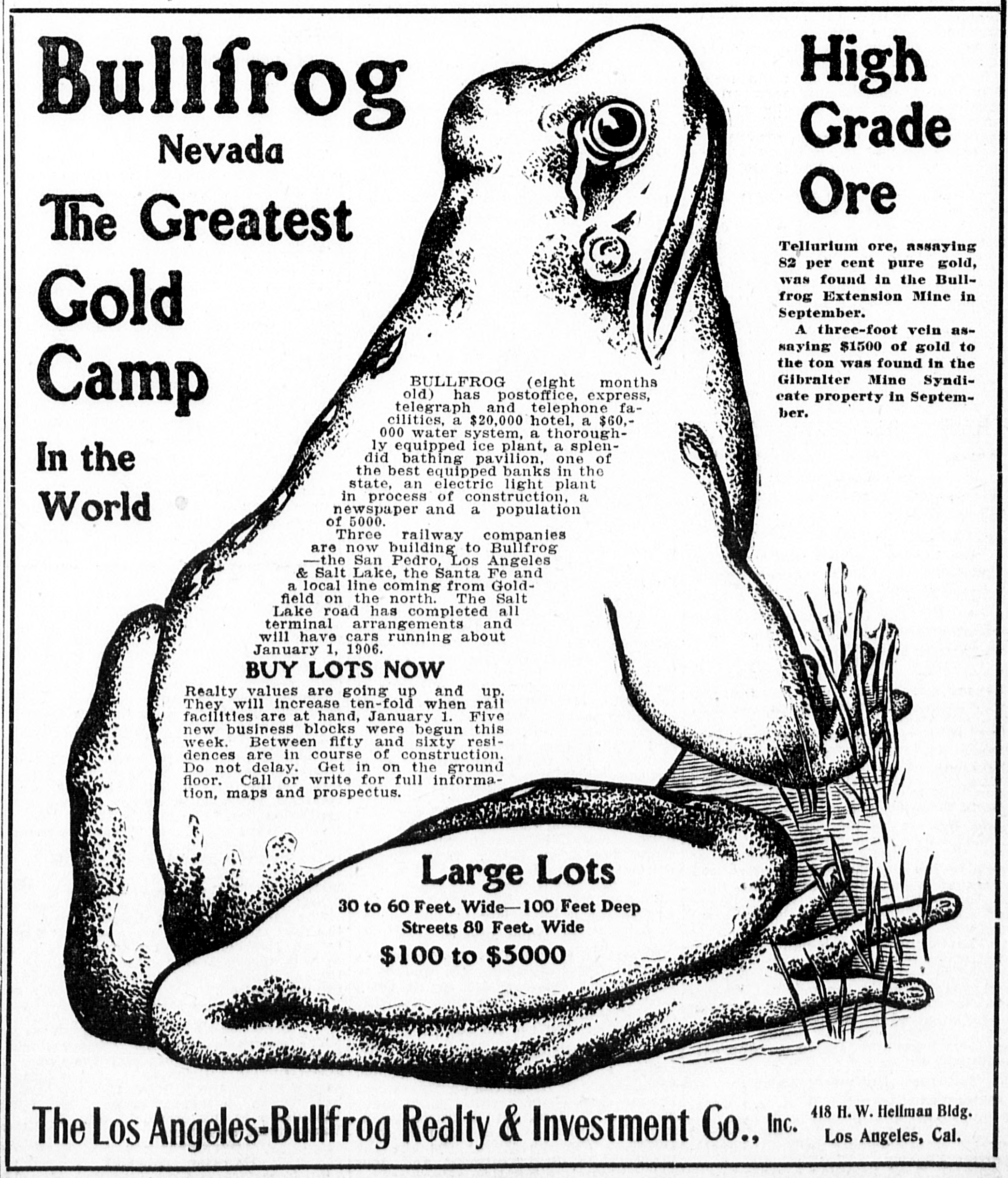
1905 advertisement

Bullfrog Mine was discovered by Frank "Shorty" Harris and Eddie Cross on August 9, 1904. The name Bullfrog was chosen either because Eddie Cross was fond of singing 'O, the bulldog on the bank and the bullfrog in the pool...' or because the ore sample of rich gold was found in green-stained rock and was frog-shaped.

It is probable Original was added to the name of the mine to distinguish it from the mining camp. By the winter of 1904, Bullfrog had about a thousand people living in tents, dugouts and congested traffic made a demand for rail connections The Bullfrog-Goldfield Railroad reached Rhyolite on May 22, 1907.

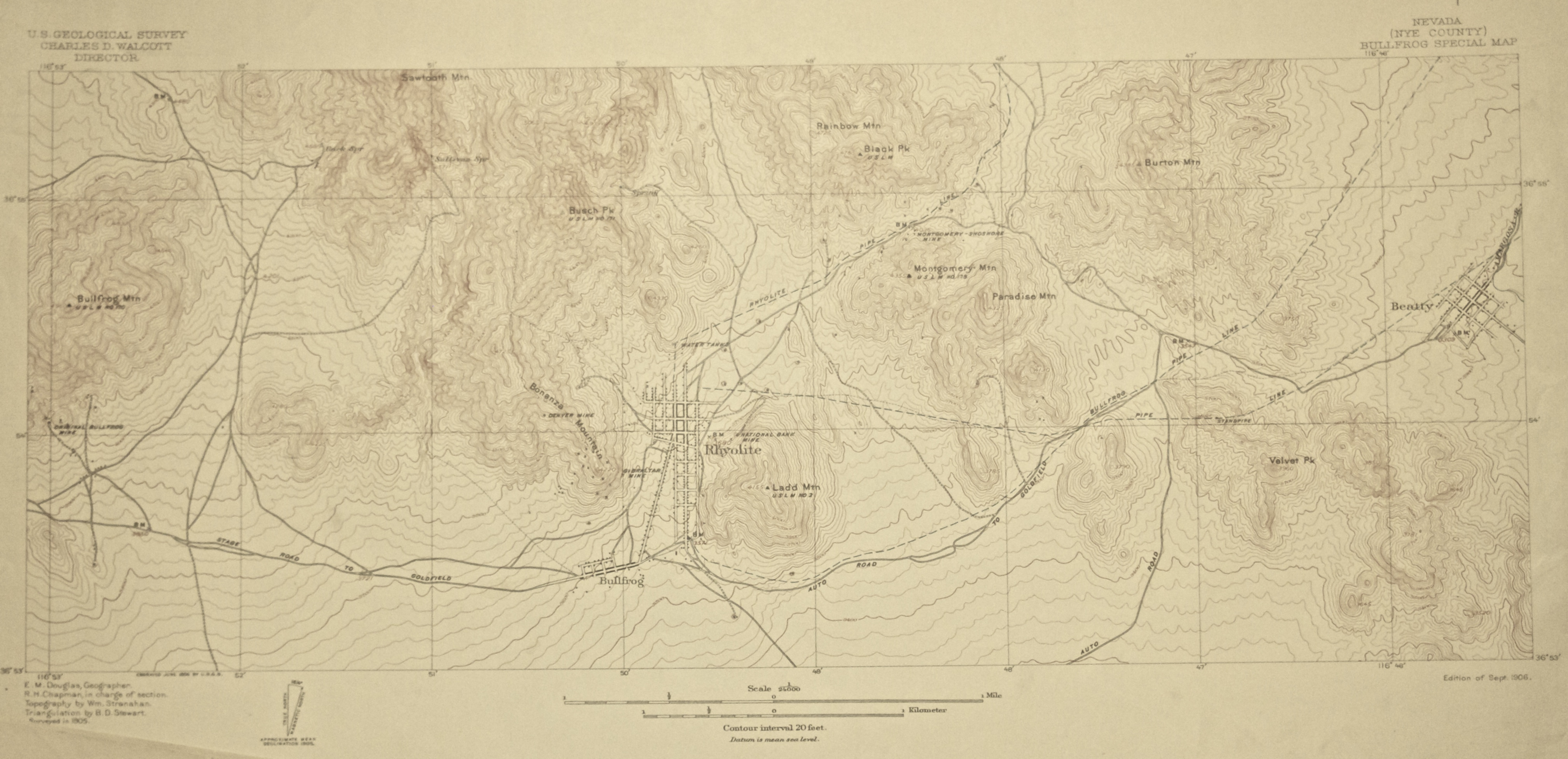
1:24,000 scale map of Rhyolite surveyed in 1905
