= Goldwell Open Air Museum =

Sculpture park and artist residency program

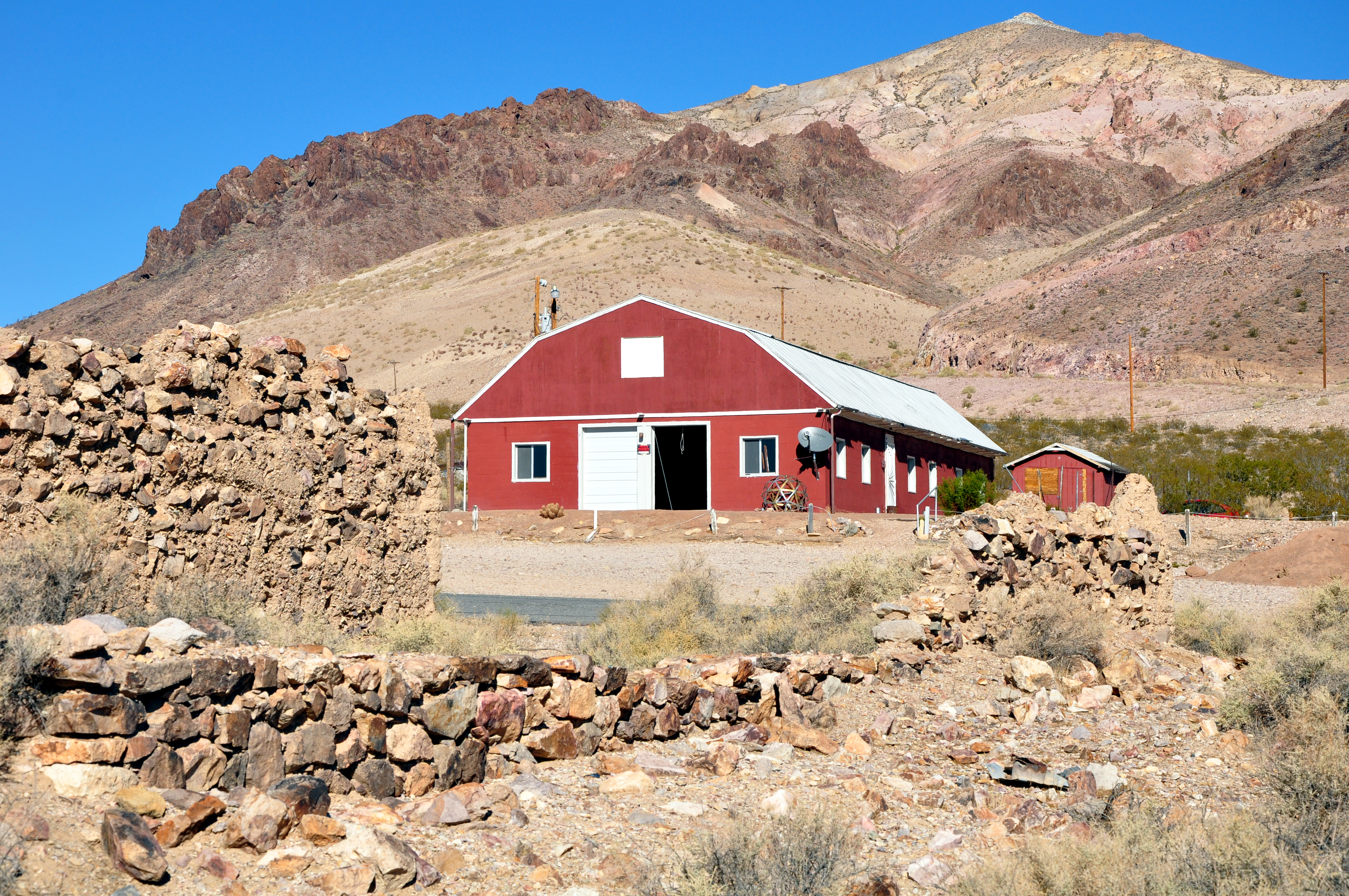
- The Red Barn sits amid the Bullfrog ruins at the base of Bonanza Mountain
- Established: 2000
- Location: near Rhyolite, Nevada
- Coordinates: 36.890223°N 116.833672°W
- Type: Outdoor sculpture park and artists' workspace
- Website: www.goldwellmuseum.org

The Goldwell Open Air Museum is an outdoor sculpture park near the ghost town of Rhyolite in the U.S. state of Nevada. The 7.8-acre (3.2 ha) site is located at the northern end of the Amargosa Valley, about 120 miles (190 km) northwest of Las Vegas, and about 4 miles (6.4 km) west of Beatty off State Route 374. About 5 miles (8.0 km) further west is Death Valley National Park. In addition to the museum, the site includes the Red Barn Art Center, a 2,250-square-foot (209 m^{2}) multi-purpose studio and exhibition space used by artists-in-residence and other artists. Near the art center are the ruins of a jail and other buildings of the historic mining town of Bullfrog.

The nonprofit museum was organized in 2000 after the death of Albert Szukalski, the Belgian artist who created the site's first sculptures in 1984 near the abandoned railway station in Rhyolite. The sculpture, The Last Supper, consists of ghostly life-sized forms arranged as in the painting The Last Supper by Leonardo da Vinci. Szukalski molded his shapes by draping plaster-soaked burlap over live models until the plaster dried enough to stand on its own. In the same year, using the same techniques, Szukalski also created Ghost Rider, a plaster figure preparing to mount a bicycle.

Between then and 2007, other artists, including three other Belgians, added new works to the project. In 1989, Szukalski created Desert Flower, an assemblage of chrome car parts found in the desert. In the 1990s, Hugo Heyrman added Lady Desert: The Venus of Nevada, a cinder block sculpture in part based on the idea of the pixel. Fred Bervoets, in Tribute to Shorty Harris, celebrated one of the prospectors whose mining discovery of 1904 led to a gold rush. Dre Peters created Icara a hand-carved female version of Icarus, the boy in Greek mythology who flew too close to the sun. David Spicer fashioned Chained to the Earth out of rhyolite from a nearby quarry. Other works at the site include Sofie Siegmann's Sit Here!, a couch created in 2000 for the Lied Discovery Children's Museum in Las Vegas and restored and moved to Goldwell in 2007. In 2006, Eames Demetrios added a plaque, Rhyolite's District of Shadows.

The museum is a member of Alliance of Artists Communities. In 2008, the New York State Artist Workspace Consortium selected it for a mentorship project. The Red Barn is the site of an arts festival, Albert's Tarantella, held each year in October.

== Gallery ==
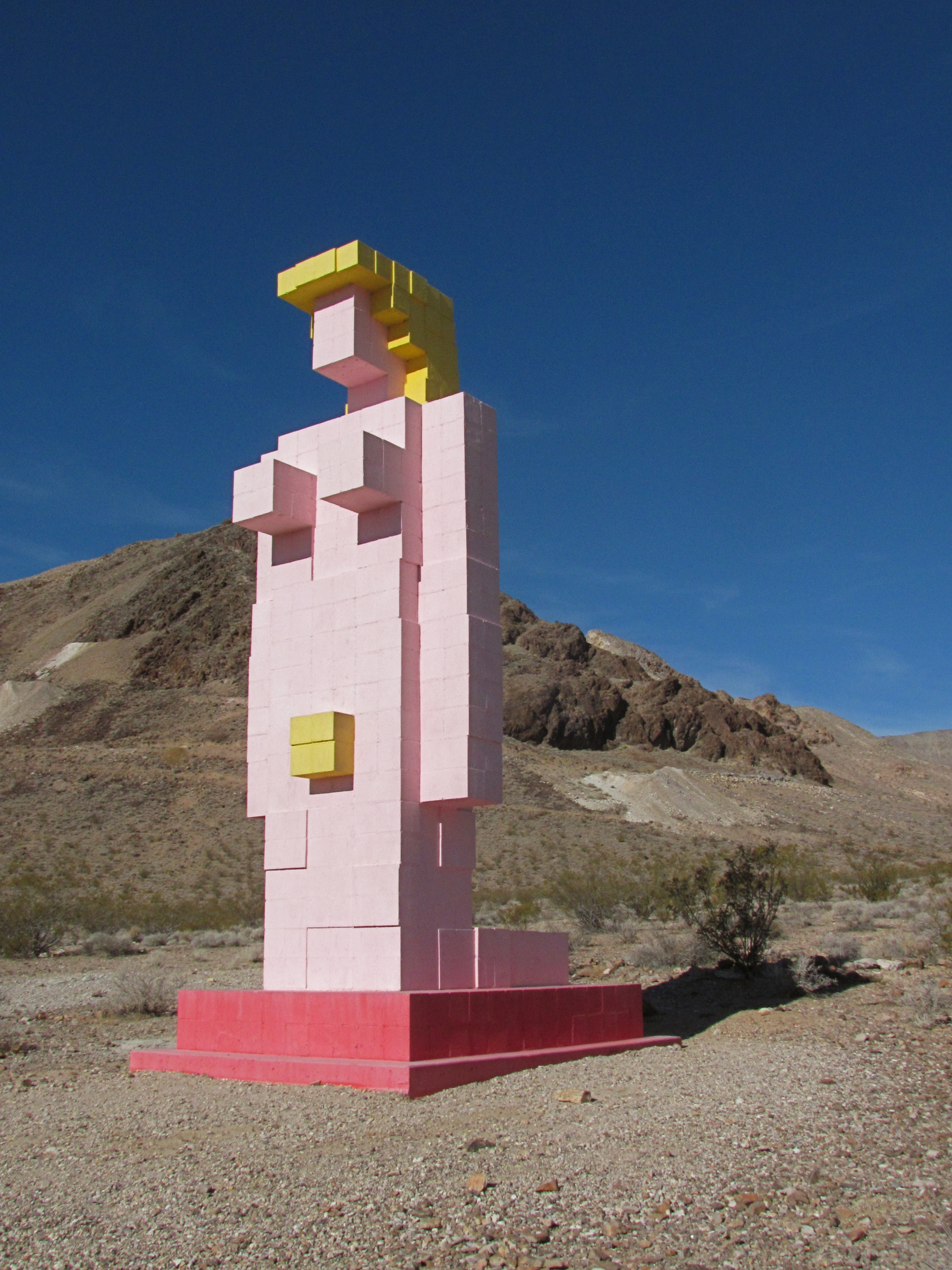
Lady Desert The Venus of Nevada by Dr.Hugo Heyrman

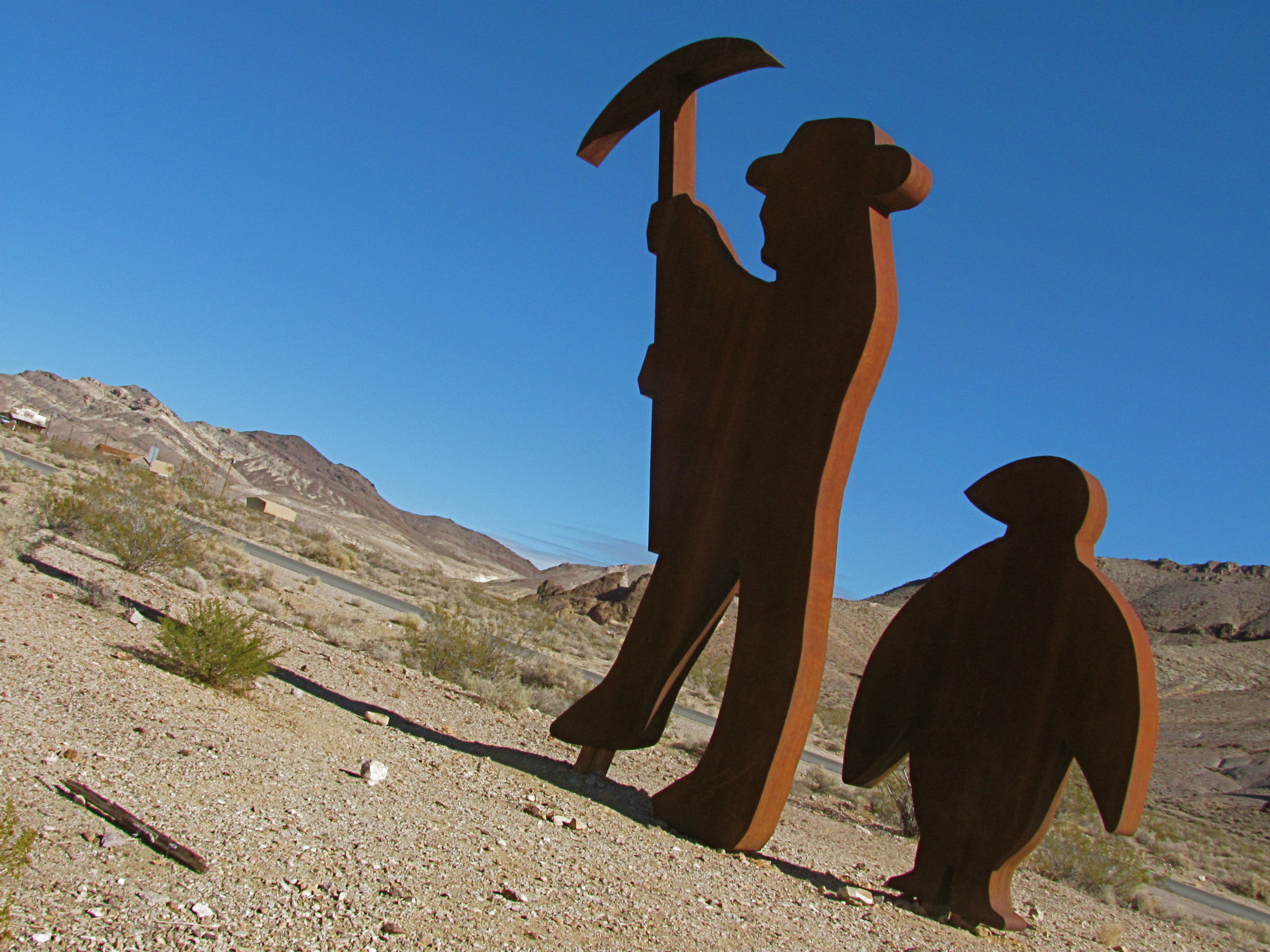
Tribute to Shorty Harris (1994) by Fred Bervoets

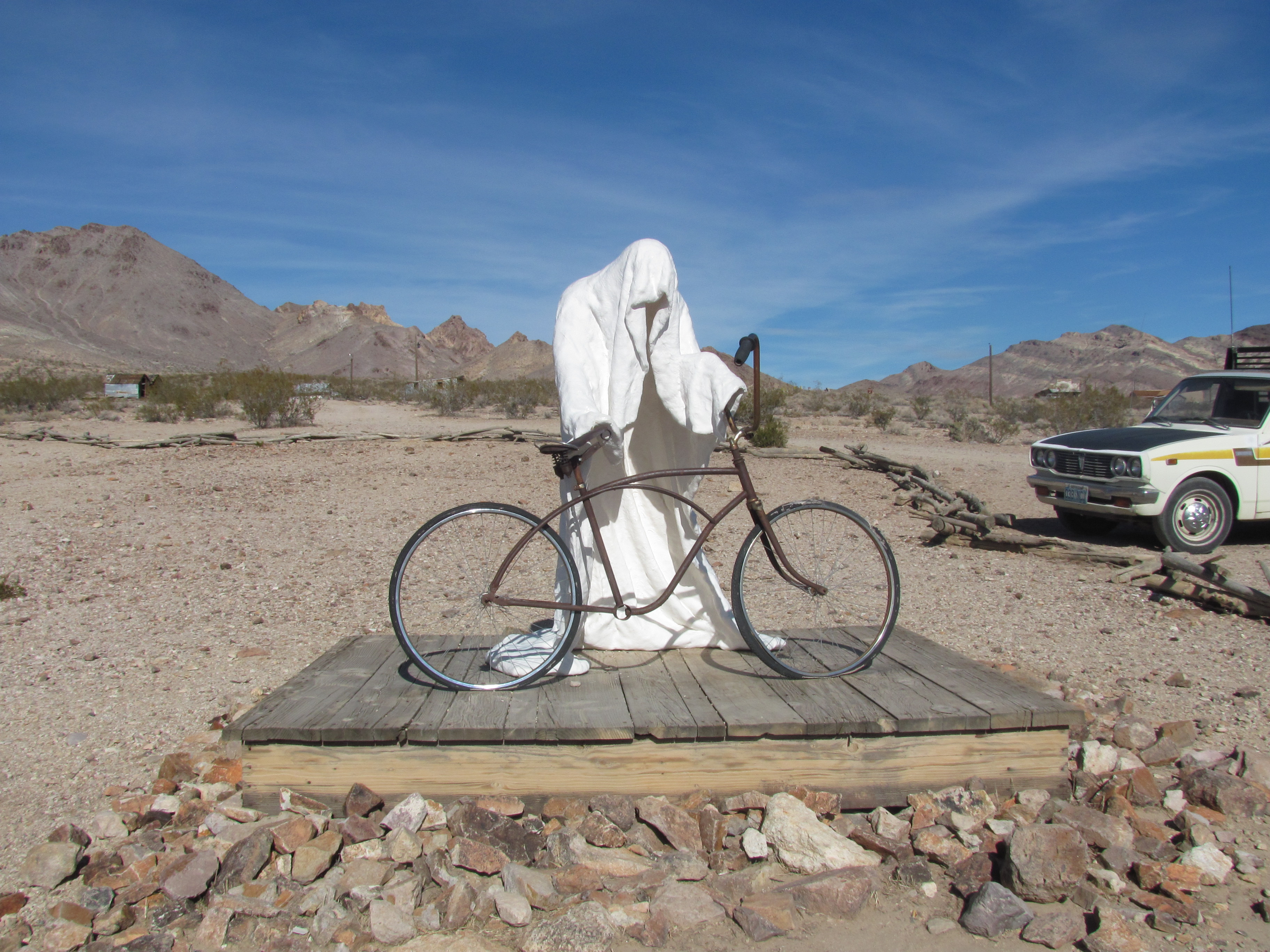
Ghost Rider (1984) by Charles Albert Szukalski

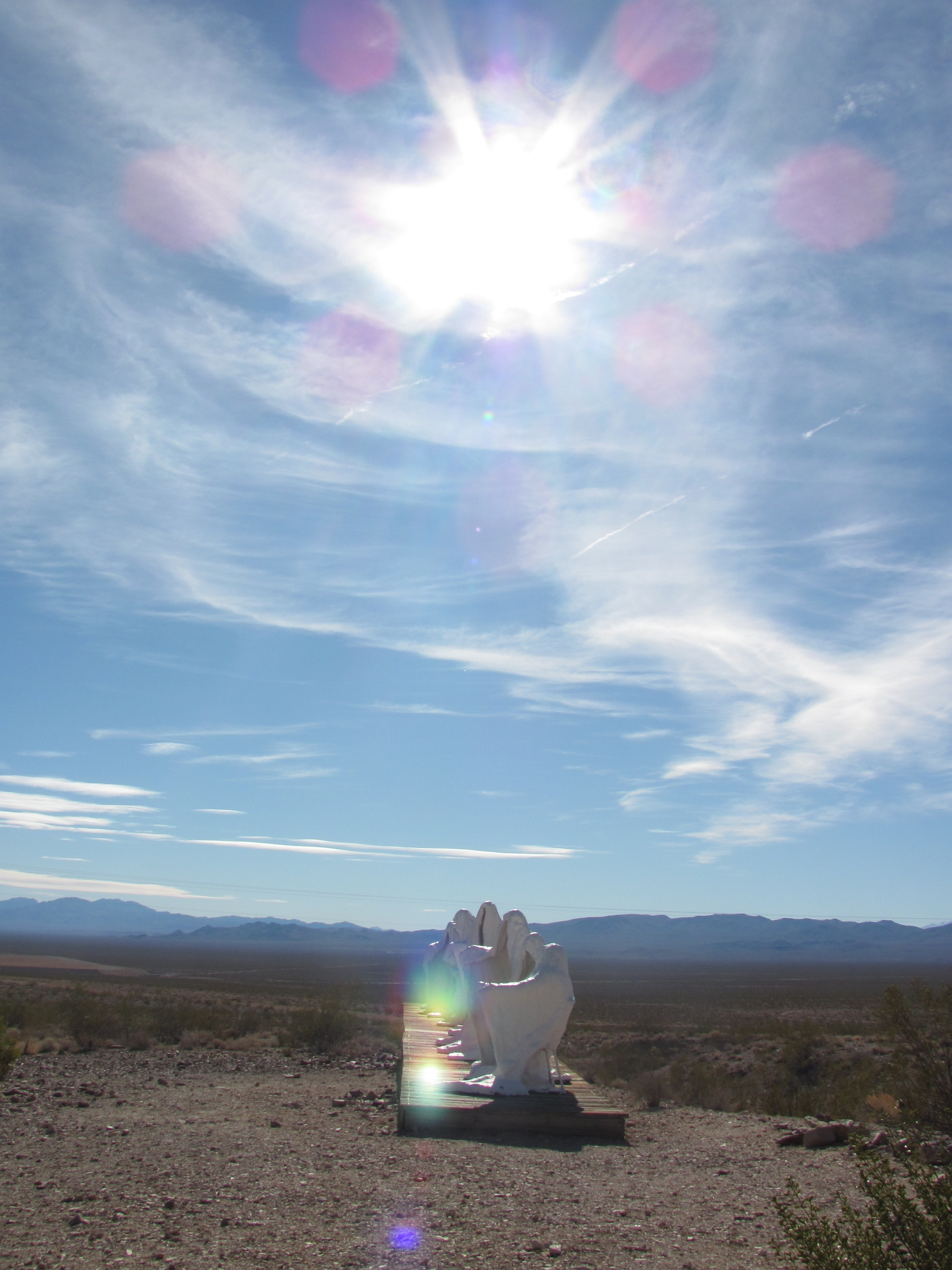
The Last Supper (1984) by Charles Albert Szukalski
