= Szukalski =

Szukalski (feminine: Szukalska) is a Polish-language surname. Notable people with this surname include:

- Albert Szukalski (1945–2000), Polish-Belgian sculptor
- Stanisław Szukalski (1893–1987), Polish painter and sculptor
- Tomasz Szukalski (1947–2012), Polish jazz saxophone player

== See also ==
- Asteroid 12259 Szukalski, named after Albert Szukalski
