= Bronx Memoir Project: Vol. 1 =

The Bronx Memoir Project: Vol. 1
- Genre: Memoir
- Published: 2014
- Publisher: The Bronx Council on the Arts
- Publication place: United States

The Bronx Memoir Project: Vol. 1 is a published anthology by The Bronx Council on the Arts and brought forth through a series of workshops meant to empower Bronx residents and shed the stigma on the Bronx's burning past.

== History ==
The Bronx Memoir Project was created as an ongoing collaboration between The Bronx Council on the Arts and other cultural institutions including: The Bronx Documentary Center, The Bronx Library Center, Edgar Allan Poe Park Visitor Center, Mindbuilders as well as other institutions and funded through a grant from the National Endowment for the Arts, secured by Bronx Writing Center Director Ms. Mario Romano in August 2013. The goal was to develop and refine memoir fragments written by people of all walks of life that share a common bond residing within the Bronx.

In March 2014, The Bronx Council on the Arts held writing workshops throughout the borough with the goal of capturing the great diversity of the Bronx. The workshops brought Bronx residents together from all walk of life but was focused on: youth, seniors and families; and had them participate in a series of workshops. The workshops facilitated by the Bronx Council of the Art director, Charlie Vazquez cultivated one's craft in memoir writing, and allowed them to use it as a tool to capture the Bronx through their prospective and away from the Bronx's burning past.

The participants in the workshops had some of their memoir pieces published in an anthology "Bronx Memoir Project Vol-1".

== Bronx Memoir Project Volume 1 ==
Published in November 2014 by BCA Media and edited by Bronx Writer Center Director, Charlie Vazquez. This is published anthology of memoir pieces written by participants in the workshop. A first of its kind anthology that bring readers into the Bronx through the eyes of its residents.

=== Participating Writers ===
Authors Name	Memoir Title	Award
Nahshon Dion Anderson	Ratcliff	Bronx Recognizes Its own
Barbara Nahmias	Mediitation	
George Colon	On a Bronx Rooftop Long Ago	
Ed Friedman	Chevrolet	
Ersilia Crawford	Polio, Mothers and World War Two	
Hayley Camacho	Just a Quiet Saturday Night	
Dahlma Llanos-Figueroa	The Shooting	
Miguel Mateo	The Next and Last Stop	
Siri Edna Nelson	Italian, Irish, French Canadian and German	
Andrea Purchas	Back In the Day	
Gerault Rotondo	Bronx Redux	
Phyllis Bowdwin	New Miracles on 34th Street	
Jean Harripersaud	A Library as Beautiful as the Bronx	
Cynthia Timms	Happiness in the House on 161st Street	
Jose Cenac	Education Journey	
Deborah William-Camps	I remember When I Lost You!	
Christina Marie Castro	The Day I Play Hookie from Kindergarten	
Ann Sealy	A Conversation with My Son	
Kenny Williams	How I Got Started in Show Business	
Awilda Aponte	Adventures in Motherhood-1977	
Alice Myerson	As It Was	
Judio Edyson	Hunts Point Behind a Glass	
Jhon Sanchez	Writing 'Major Ascension Luna'	
Laurie Humpel	Morning and Evening	
Maria Meli	Swamp Guineas	
Olga Kitt	The Products of a Social Experiment	
Joseph Carrion	July 1977	
David Duenias	Untitled	
Steven L. Leslie	Cowpath Lane	
Bernice Cox	Best Friend Lost	
Orlando Ferrand	2000	Bronx Recognizes Its own
Mandy Lopez	After Thirteen Years!	
Erykah Solano	Untitled	
Brian Rodriquez	Untitled	
Dolores Scarpato	Bronx Story	
Mindy Matijasevic	Are You Lonesome Tonight?	
B. Lawrence	Untitled	
Judy Bratnick	Mathland	
Paul Torres	The Accident	
Edgar E. Cabrera	The Fall Classic and the South Bronx	
Sarah Smith	Feel the Beat	
Hayley Camacho	First Christmas	
Colleen Boris	My Dad was a Teamster Man, Not a Social Worker ... and Yet	
Sidra Lackey	I am a Tattooed Woman	
Ranjit K. Sahu	Little Things	
Jose Quiles	Webster Avenue and Nearby	
Peggy Robles-Alvarado	Undocumented	
Dale Benjamin Drakeford	Uncle Brondus	
Susan Rotgard	Bronx Memories	
Michael Cruz	Theresa	
Lucy Aponte	When the Bronx Was Burning	
Louie Santiago	I saw Fordham Road	
Yadhira Gonzalez-Taylor, Esq	Eighties Bronx as Seen Through the Eyes of an Eight-Year-Old	
Marte-Bautista	El Misinformed	
Sonia Fuentes Resto	The Kelly Street I Knew	
Toby Z Liederman	Bill's in Calvary	
Shavonne Bell	Wake me Up at 6:30	
Olga Kitt	Joe and Jose	
B. Lynn Carter	Snow and Fog	
Barbara Gurkin Fasciani	School Days	
Lydia Clark	Irene Gertrude Felix, 1921	
Jose Cenac	Trayectoria Academica	
Jhon Sanchez	El Casi-casi esta vez en mayo	

== Bronx Memoir Project Volume 2 ==
After great success in using memoir allowing readers experience the Bronx through the eyes of the people who call it home instead of the media depiction a second volume was created. The memoir was published in the Fall of 2017 and has returning voices but feature a lot of new writers who seek to showcase the Bronx as their home, instead of the media depiction of: The Bronx is Burning.
