= The Air Mail =

1925 film by Irvin Willat

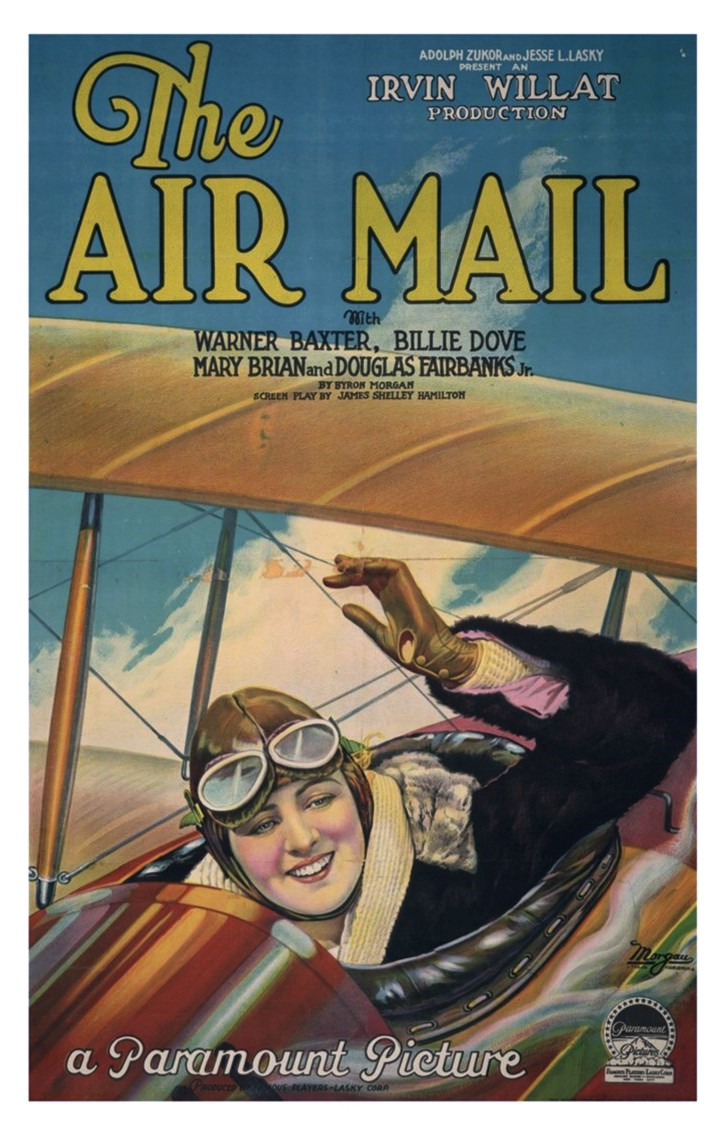
- Film poster
- Directed by: Irvin Willat
- Written by: James Shelley Hamilton (scenario)
- Story by: Byron Morgan
- Produced by: Adolph Zukor; Jesse Lasky
- Starring: Warner Baxter; Billie Dove; Douglas Fairbanks Jr.
- Cinematography: Alfred Gilks
- Production company: Famous Players–Lasky Corporation
- Distributed by: Paramount Pictures
- Release date: March 16, 1925
- Running time: 80 minutes
- Country: United States
- Language: Silent (English intertitles)

The Air Mail is a 1925 American silent drama film directed by Irvin Willat and starring Warner Baxter, Billie Dove, and Douglas Fairbanks Jr. It was produced by Famous Players–Lasky and distributed through Paramount Pictures. Filmed in Death Valley National Park and the ghost town of Rhyolite, Nevada, it was released in the United States on March 16, 1925.

== Plot ==
Russ Kane gets a job as a pilot in Reno, Nevada, in order to steal cargo. However, after training he becomes dedicated to his work. After making a forced landing, however, at a "Ghost City" in the desert, he falls in love with Alice Rendon and decides to become law-abiding.

When her father needs medicine, he flies to get it, but on the way back is chased by smugglers in other aircraft trafficking narcotics and illegal immigrants across the Mexican border. As a result, "Sandy", Kane's friend, parachutes from Kane's aircraft with the medicine.

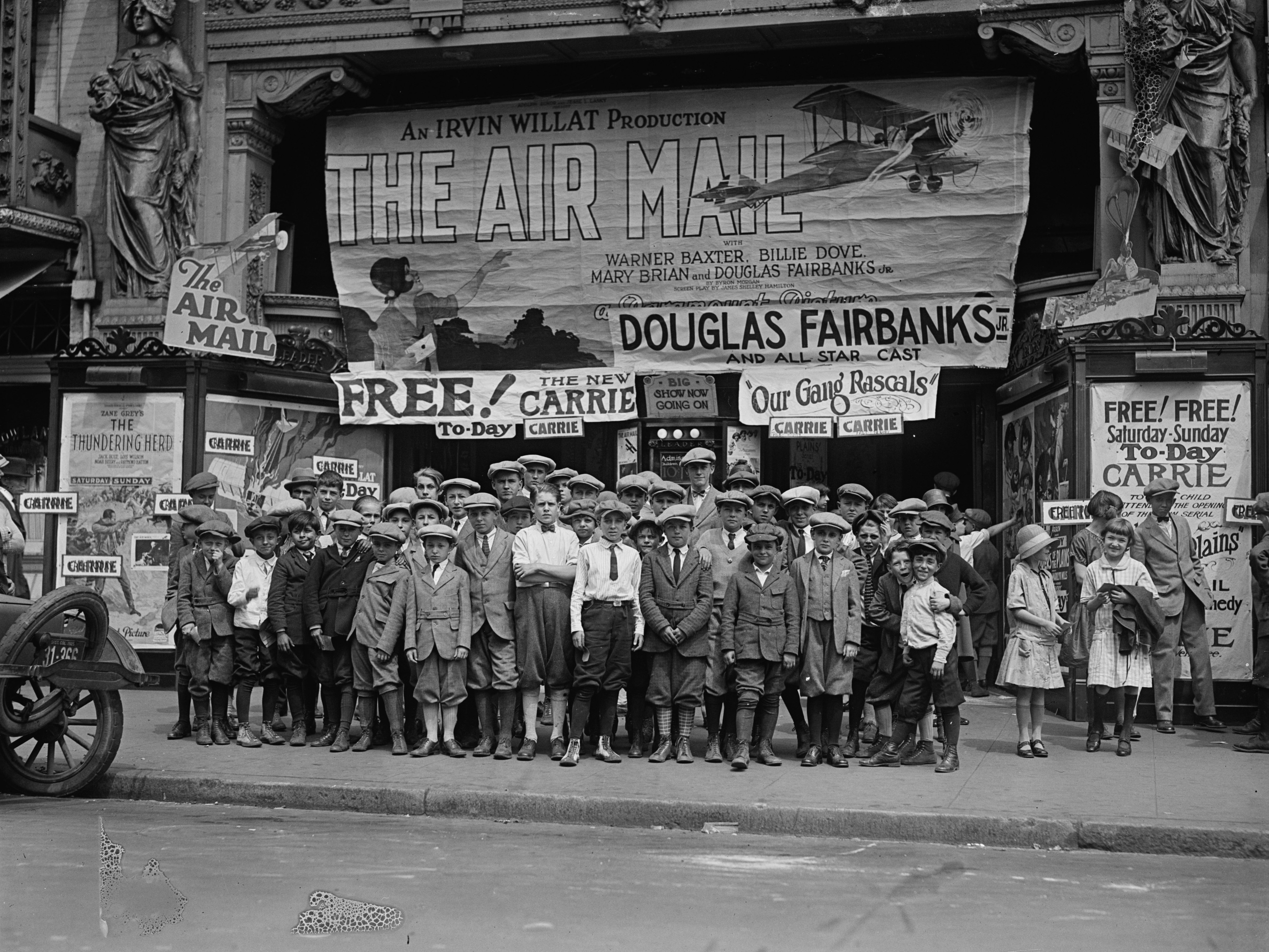
Leader Theater in Washington, DC with The Air Mail ads

Meanwhile, escaped prisoners have invaded Alice's home. All is resolved when a sheriff's posse confronts the invaders and Kane destroys the bandit's aircraft. In the end, Sandy becomes a pilot.

== Cast ==
- Warner Baxter as Russ Kane
- Billie Dove as Alice Rendon
- Mary Brian as Minnie Wade
- Douglas Fairbanks Jr. as "Sandy"
- George Irving as Peter Rendon
- Richard Tucker as Jim Cronin
- Guy Oliver as Bill Wade
- Lee Shumway as "Scotty"
- Jack Byron as Rene Lenoir
- John Webb Dillon as Donald McKee
- Lloyd Whitlock as Speck

== Production ==
Writer Byron Morgan, himself a pilot, strived for authenticity in the story of The Air Mail. To find out what air mail pilots were encountering, Morgan flew on an air mail flight from Reno, Nevada, to San Francisco. The hazards that were found along the route including flying over the Rocky Mountains and inclement weather.

To make The Air Mail, the, Famous Players–Lasky company traveled by train to Beatty, Nevada, about 4 miles (6 km) east of Rhyolite, where it set up temporary headquarters on January 10, 1925. Aircraft used in the film such as the DH .4 and Catron & Fisk arrived from Reno via Tonopah. Stunt pilot Frank Tomlck was hired to do the actual flying in the film, eschewing the use of sound stages or studio effects.

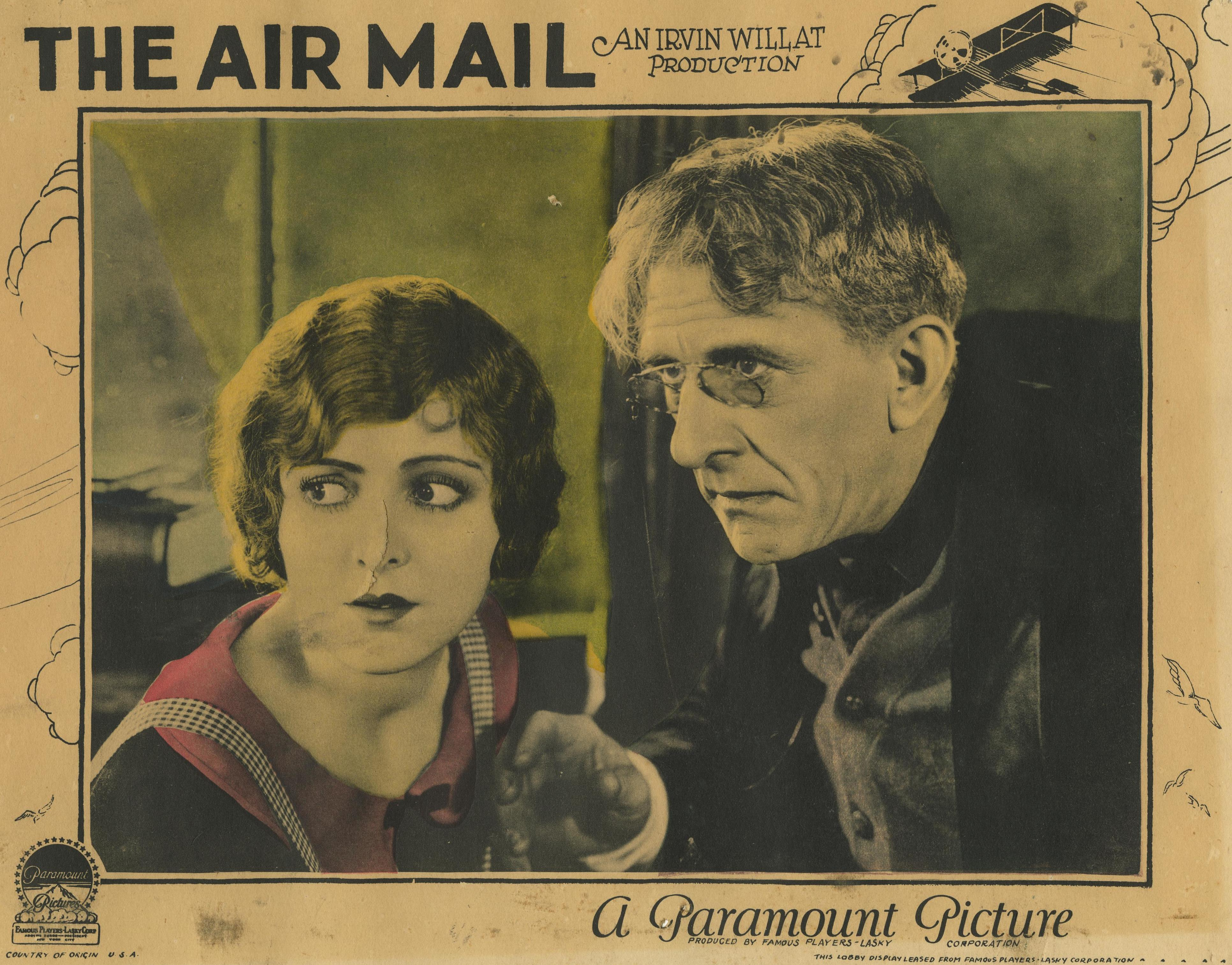
The Air Mail lobby card

The filming was completed by the end of January. During the filming, Famous Players–Lasky restored the Bottle House, one of the deteriorating buildings in the ghost town.

== Reception ==
Critics deprecated The Air Mail as an "... up-to-date western adventure", virtually ignoring its aviation theme. At the same time, other features based on flying air mail, Trapped in the Sky (1922) and The Fast Mail (1922) were characterized as basically inferior to the Paramount production.

Reviewer Mordaunt Hall, writing for The New York Times in 1925, said that although Dove and Baxter in The Air Mail, "... deliver creditable performances", the story is "... only mildly interesting and often quite tedious". While he thought the scenes of aircraft taking off from the ground were "quite inspiring", he found the stock villains, Deadwood Dick adventures, and romantic conversations between a man at 4,000 feet (1,200 m) in the air and a woman on the ground to be improbable. "This picture ...", he concluded, "... is interesting because of the modern touch to an ordinary Western story, but the idea deserves to be more thoughtful and sincere."

Only one-half (four of eight reels) of a single print of The Air Mail exists today, stored at the Library of Congress in Washington, D.C.
