= Albert Szukalski =

Artist (1945–2000)

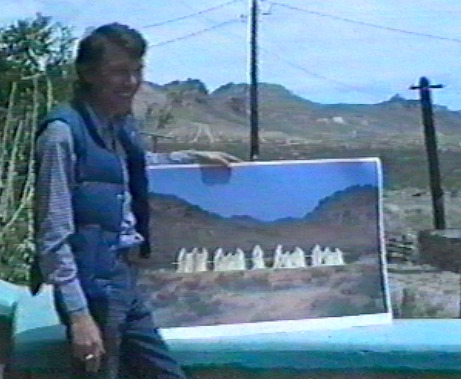
Albert Szukalski, 1988 in Rhyolite, Nevada, with a photo of his sculpture "The Last Supper“

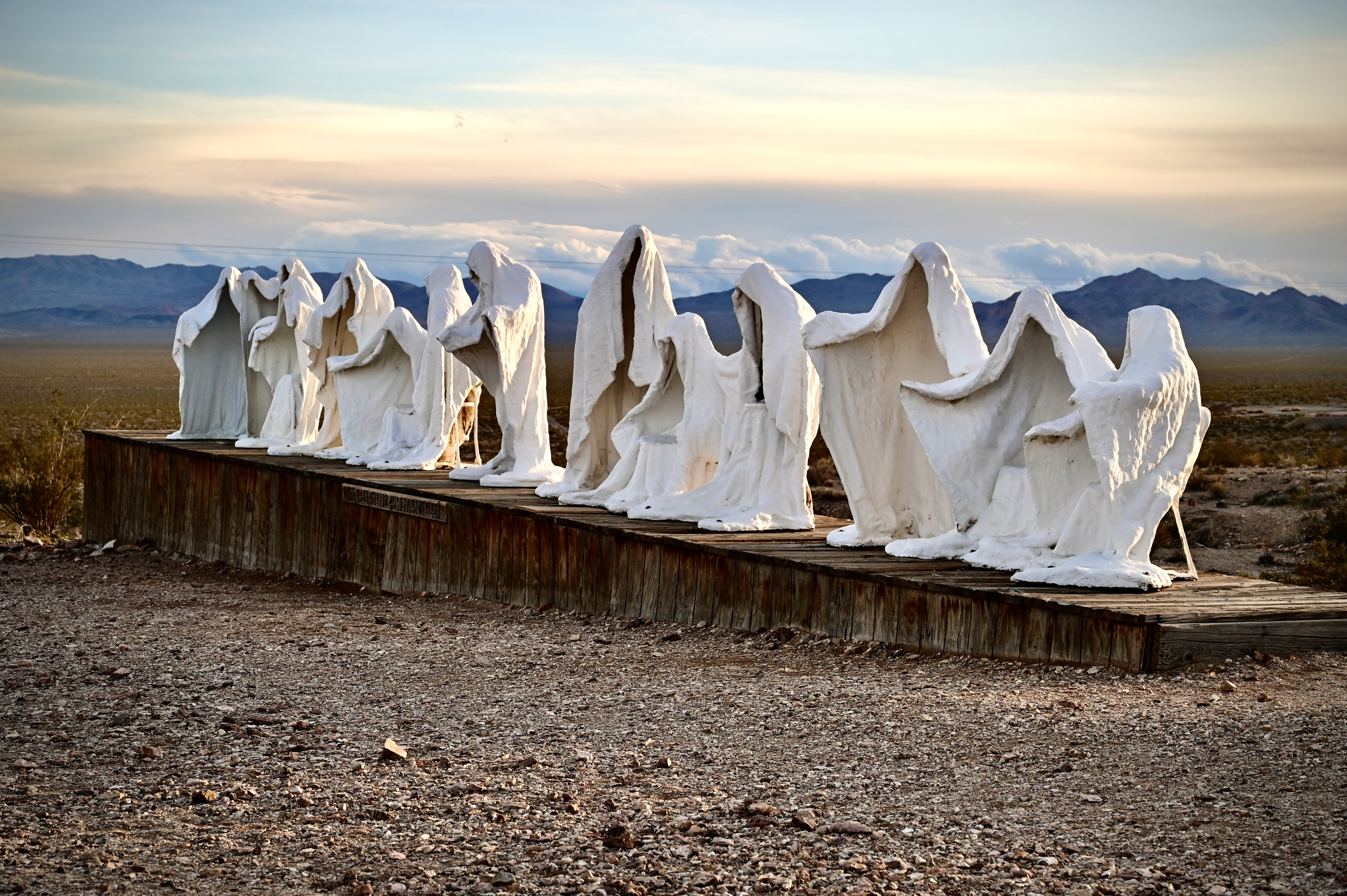
Albert Szukalski's "The Last Supper"

Albert Szukalski (4 April 1945, in Furth im Wald – 25 January 2000, in Antwerp) was a Polish-Belgian visual artist who worked with the use of mixed media and sculpture.

== Career ==
Szukalski was best known as the sculptor of works that the artist termed "ghosts". Szukalski traveled to the Nevada desert in 1984 to create "The Last Supper" sculpture, considered to be the centerpiece of the Goldwell Open Air Museum near Rhyolite, Nevada.

12259 Szukalski (1989 SZ1) is a main-belt asteroid discovered on 26 September 1989 by Eric Walter Elst at the European Southern Observatory. The object was named in honor of Albert Szukalski.
