= Bronx Council on the Arts =

Art based culture agency

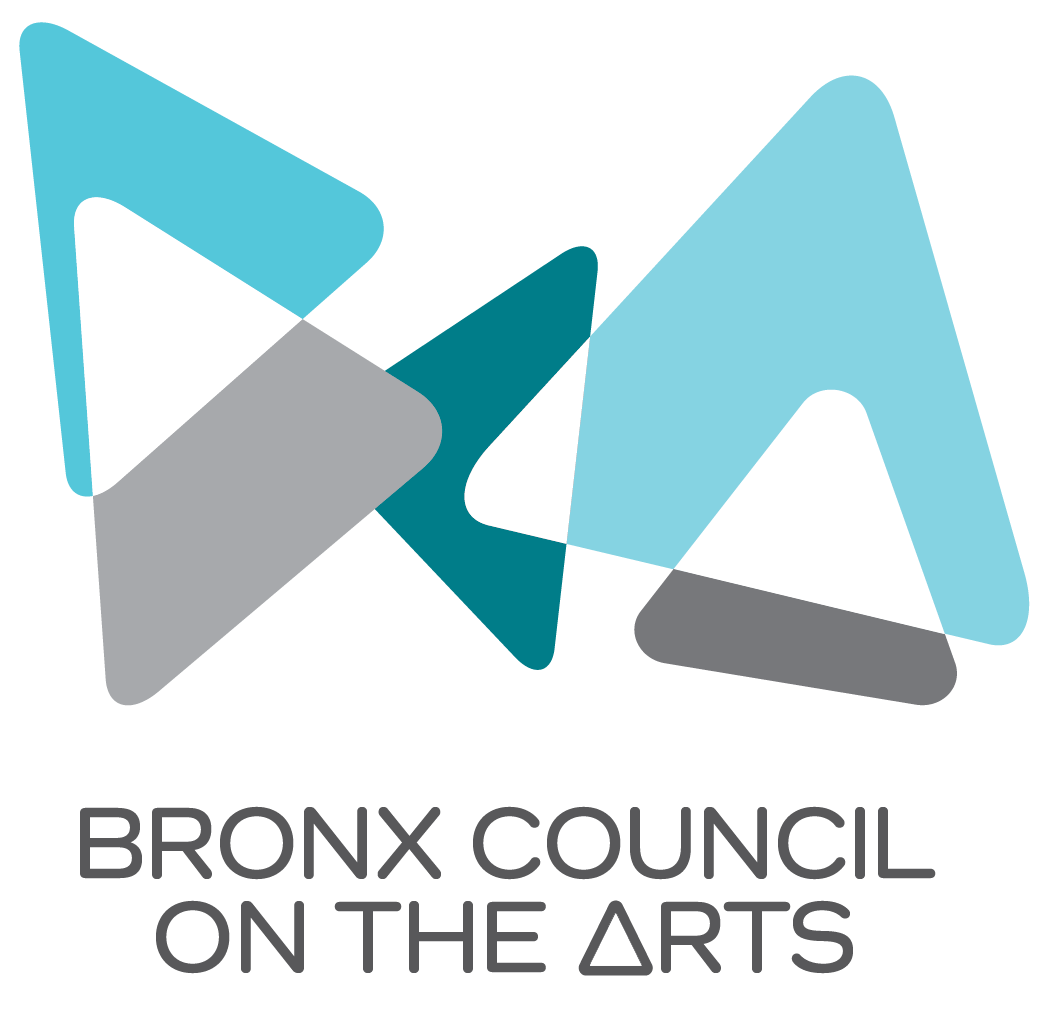
- Abbreviation: BCA
- Predecessor: Bronx Committee on the Arts
- Established: 1962; 64 years ago
- Type: Non-profit
- Legal status: 501(c)(3)
- Headquarters: Westchester Square, Bronx, New York
- Region served: The Bronx
- Services: arts and cultural services
- Chairperson: Charles Rice-Gonzalez
- Treasurer: Sheila McDaniel
- Secretary: Shereen Margolis
- Executive Director: Viviana Bianchi
- Budget: 1.6 Million
- Staff: 10 (2014)
- Website: www.bronxarts.org

The Bronx Council on the Arts (established 1962), is an art based culture agency that has grown to become the official cultural agency of the Bronx, New York City. It provides a “lifeline” to more than 4,800 artists and over 250 arts and community-based organizations.

== History ==
The Bronx Council on the Arts was founded in the early 1960s when community leaders: Jerry Klot, Reverend William Kaladjian and others came together to provide summer arts & culture activities in the Bronx. In 1969 the Bronx Council on the arts merged with the Bronx Committee on the Arts and worked to improve access to the arts around the Bronx by introducing various programs around the Borough including the Bronx regrets program and the opening of the Bronx Museum of the Arts.

As the Bronx Council on the Arts continued to grow they offered their programs at various galleries and venues located throughout the Bronx but lacked a central space. That changed in 2011 when Chase donated the former Washington Mutual Branch located at 2700 East Tremont Avenue to be used as their headquarters. Due to lack of funds, the group was unable to develop and utilize the space. In 2015 with support from Councilman James Vacca and Borough President Ruben Diaz Jr and other donors, they were able to obtain the funds needed to renovate the building and utilize it as their central office and moved in during 2019.

== Programs ==
The Bronx Council on the Arts runs several programs including:

- Bronx Recognizes Its Own Award (BRIO), established 1989 to support Bronx based artists and performers. The number of recipients and amount each grantee received has varied over the years and recipients are expected to do community service for a local arts organization as part of the award.
- Bronx Writers Center - creative writing and professional development workshops. The Bronx Memoir Project is one of its projects.
- Longwood Art Gallery - hosted by Hostos Center for the Arts & Culture in the Hostos Community College campus.
- The Bronx Cultural Trolley Arts and Culture Tour.

== APPLAUSE Awards ==
In 2011 the Bronx Council on the Arts created the APPLAUSE award to recognize artists and leaders from the Bronx. The first recipients included Eva Bornstein, executive director of Lehman Center for the Performing Arts; Madaha Kinsey-Lamb, founder and executive director of Mind-Builders Creative Arts Center; Holly Block, executive director of the Bronx Museum of the Arts; Gail Nathan, executive director of the Bronx River Art Center; and Rosalba Rolón, artistic director of Pregones Theater.

== Bronx Writers Center ==
In 1996, the Bronx Council on the Arts created the Bronx Writers Center as a means of fostering community and empowering writers. The program has grown into a yearly series of workshops located at various cultural venues across the Bronx and functions as not just a place for emerging writers to cultivate their skill but a place for writers to find creative mentors, network and work on professional development. Through collaboration with PEN American Center and the Bronx Museum of the Arts participants have the opportunity to participate in PEN World Voices literary festival. In 2013, Charlie Vazquez led a weekly writing workshop at the Bronx Writing Center.
