= Lisa Funderburke Hoffman =

American arts administrator

- Born: Lisa Funderburke; 1970 (age 55–56); Long Island, New York
- Occupation: Art Administrator

Lisa Funderburke Hoffman (b. Long Island, NY in 1970) is an American arts administrator and non-profit Director known for advocating for a bridge between art and science and supporting community engagement in the arts.

== Education ==
In 1994 Hoffman received her Masters of Science from Howard University in Washington, DC where she studied biology. In 1998 she was a National Science Foundation Fellow.

== Career ==
Hoffman was Associate Director of the McColl Center for Art + Innovation, a contemporary art center in Charlotte, NC. While working for the McColl Center, Hoffman pioneered models of artist-led community engagement for Charlotte. Prior to working in the arts at McColl she was Director of the Charlotte Nature Museum and worked at the National Museum of Natural History. She compared scientists to artists because of their ability to look for the unexpected. Hoffman advocated for Environmental Art and Public Art as a catalyst to integrate established communities with new members. She was Curator of Art + Ecology for the Brightwalk project, a sustainable neighborhood development in Charlotte, NC.

In the Summer of 2015 Lisa Hoffman was appointed by President Barack Obama as a member of the National Museum and Library Services Board. In the Summer of 2016 she was appointed the Director of Artist Communities Alliance (formerly known as the Alliance of Artists Communities), an international network of artist residency programs. In early January 2026, Funderburke resigned from the Artist Communities Alliance; on January 29, 2026, the Newark Museum of Art announced Funderburke as its next director and chief executive.
