= Alliance of Artists Communities =

Artists' non-profit organization

Coordinates: 41.8239664°N 71.4108131°W

Artist Communities Alliance
- Location: P.O.Box 23212 Providence, Rhode Island, U.S.
- Website: artistcommunities.org

Artist Communities Alliance (ACA), formerly known as Alliance of Artists Communities, is an international non-profit arts organization. Founded in 1991 following a pilot program and recommendation through the MacArthur Foundation, the organization is focused on advocacy, promotion, and cultivation of residencies for artists and artist communities. The organization created the first national directory of artist communities in 1995 and today maintains a directory of over 300 international artist residency organizations. In addition to the residency directory, Artist Communities Alliance provides networking, year-round virtual programing and resources for artist residency programs, as well as grantmaking and consortia programs.

Members of ACA include the MacDowell Colony in Peterborough, New Hampshire, Sculpture Space in Utica, New York, the Archie Bray Foundation for the Ceramic Arts in Helena, Montana, Banff Centre for Arts and Creativity in Banff, Alberta, and Bemis Center for Contemporary Arts in Omaha, Nebraska.

The organization moved from being headquartered in Providence, Rhode Island, which was the product of a 2002 invitation by then Rhode Island School of Design president Roger Mandle, to being fully remote after the onset of the COVID-19 pandemic. The Alliance was led by Lisa Funderburke Hoffman as the President + CEO from 2016 to January 2026; the ACA maintains a small staff across the United States.
