= Charlie Vázquez =

American musician

- Born: Carlos Luis Vázquez; May 14, 1971 (age 55); New York City, U.S.
- Occupations: Artist; writer; musician; publisher
- Writing career
- Notable works: Buzz and Israel
- Website: www.firekingpress.com

Carlos Luis "Charlie" Vázquez (born May 14, 1971) is a self-identified queer American artist, writer, and musician of Cuban and Puerto Rican descent and a New York Foundation For The Arts and NEA Fellow for poetry. He is also the editor of Fireking Press, where he has published a novel and a book of short stories. He serves as the deputy director of the Bronx Council on the Arts, and runs the group's writing center. His fiction, erotica and essays have appeared in a number of anthologies, magazines, and websites. He lives in Brooklyn, New York, with his partner, poet John Williams.

== Early years and education ==
Carlos Luis Vázquez was born at Fordham Hospital in The Bronx, New York, on May 14, 1971, to a Cuban-Puerto Rican mother and Puerto Rican father. He is oldest of five children. His earliest years were spent in the disinvested East Tremont neighborhood of the Bronx, where his parents befriended several members of the Reapers, a notorious South Bronx street gang. His family then moved north, to the Fordham neighborhood, where he became fascinated by a small white cottage in a nearby park that was poet Edgar Allan Poe’s final home. Before divorcing in 1981, his parents moved the family east, to Allerton Avenue and White Plains Road, where Vázquez attended the Richard Rodgers School, PS 96, Whalen Junior High School and Christopher Columbus High School, where he served as a lead trumpet player in orchestras and jazz bands. Vázquez recalls, “I grew up with a range of influences, some very dark. But music and books were always a way to open up my eyes to a different world, something to escape to,” who, as a young child “became attached to playing the trumpet and reading through scores of second-hand books”.

== Career ==
Vázquez's first novel, Buzz and Israel (Fireking Press, 2004), details the complicated relationship between Israel, a closeted Puerto Rican actor, and Buzz, a junkie and jewelry store thief. Inspired by the writings of Jean Genet and William S. Burroughs, the novel follows the passionate and dysfunctional relationship from Portland, Oregon, where they meet, to New York City, where the story ends, by way of Seattle, San Francisco, Los Angeles, the Mojave Desert and Phoenix, Arizona. The "intoxicated work of transient fiction" was inspired by his youthful years on the West Coast, where he used illicit drugs, experimented with his sexuality, recorded experimental music and traveled throughout the Western United States and Vancouver, British Columbia. He had left New York City for Portland, Oregon in 1988. He joined a band and studied music production believing music "was the voice he had long been searching" but learned the "written word held a magnetic attraction".

Buzz and Israel explores the twilight worlds of transsexual shamans, heroin addicts, Santería priestesses and queer criminals. Its third-person voice examines the unique experiences of a New York Latino (Israel) immersed in a mostly white American subculture. In a panel on Latino contemporary literature at Fordham University, Vázquez stated, "I'm Latino. I'm gay. I am both of those things and to recognize that is a celebration of my sexuality and my roots."

Buzz and Israel was followed by Business as Unusual (2007, Fireking Press) is a fiction collection composed of two novellas and three short stories that were written in Southern California, Baja California, Oregon, and New York City. This collection of fiction explores themes of transsexuality, fortune-telling, reincarnation, mesmerism and fetishism, as told through the first-person narratives of strange and revealing narrators.

His second novel, Contraband (2010, Rebel Satori Press) superimposes a 1959 Cuban Revolution-styled technological overhaul of government onto the United States of the near future, where intellectuals, queers and artists are sought and executed by a faceless dictatorship.

Vázquez is one of thirty bloggers who support Latino Rebels website which launched May 5 (Cinco de Mayo) in 2011, and features on social media. Their primary objective is to "kill stereotypes with humor, insight, [and] compassion" while empowering the Latino community.

The 2013 book Hustler Rave XXX: Poetry of the Eternal Survivor, is a collection of poems about gay male prostitution written by Vázquez and David Caleb-Acevedo.

In 2013 he co-founded the start-up Editorial Trance (ET) with Marlena Fitzpatrick, and serves as Chief Creative Officer. The e-book publisher covers works "...that are culturally and historically relevant to the Latino community, which has been largely ignored by the major [publishers]", according to Vázquez. ET's launch title was Demystifying a Diva: The truth behind the myth of La Lupe, about La Lupe, the "Queen of Latin Soul".

Vázquez's fiction, erotica and essays have been published in a number of anthologies, including Best Gay Love Stories: New York City (2006), Best Gay Erotica 2008, and Queer and Catholic (2008). His short stories, articles and interviews have also appeared in print and online publications such as Advocate.com, NYpress.com, Tanglefoot, Dreck Magazine, BigFib.com, and Mensbook Journal. He is also a former contributor to the Village Voice blog Naked City.

Vázquez hosts a monthly reading series called PANIC! at Nowhere in the East Village, Manhattan, where he first witnessed punk rock, Gothic rock and queer culture in the 1980s. The series features both published and unpublished queer, female and transsexual writers of erotica, horror and unusual fiction and poetry. Vázquez cites Edgar Allan Poe, James Baldwin, Serge Gainsbourg, Siouxsie and the Banshees, Celia Cruz, Arsenio Rodríguez, Celina y Reutilio, Diamanda Galás and Joy Division as cultural influences.

Starting in 2016, novelist Álvaro Enrigue, and writers Vázquez and Lisa Ko founded and led PEN America's DREAMing Out Loud workshops. The free workshops for undocumented immigrant students for all of City University of New York since 2016, giving the students a framework to "develop original writings and empowers them to use their voices to help change the misinformation on immigrants". The workshops have led to public readings and an anthology, DREAMing Out Loud: Voices of Undocumented Students.

In June 2017, Vasquez was among the ten New York City essayists—including Mira Jacob, Tracy O’Neill and Anelise Chen—in Electric Lit’s Bodega Project, who wrote "personal portraits of their local bodegas".

== See also ==
- List of Cuban American writers
- LGBT literature
- List of gay, lesbian or bisexual people
- List of LGBT writers
- List of Puerto Rican writers
- Puerto Rican literature
