= Rhyolite, Nevada =

Rhyolite
- Ghost town
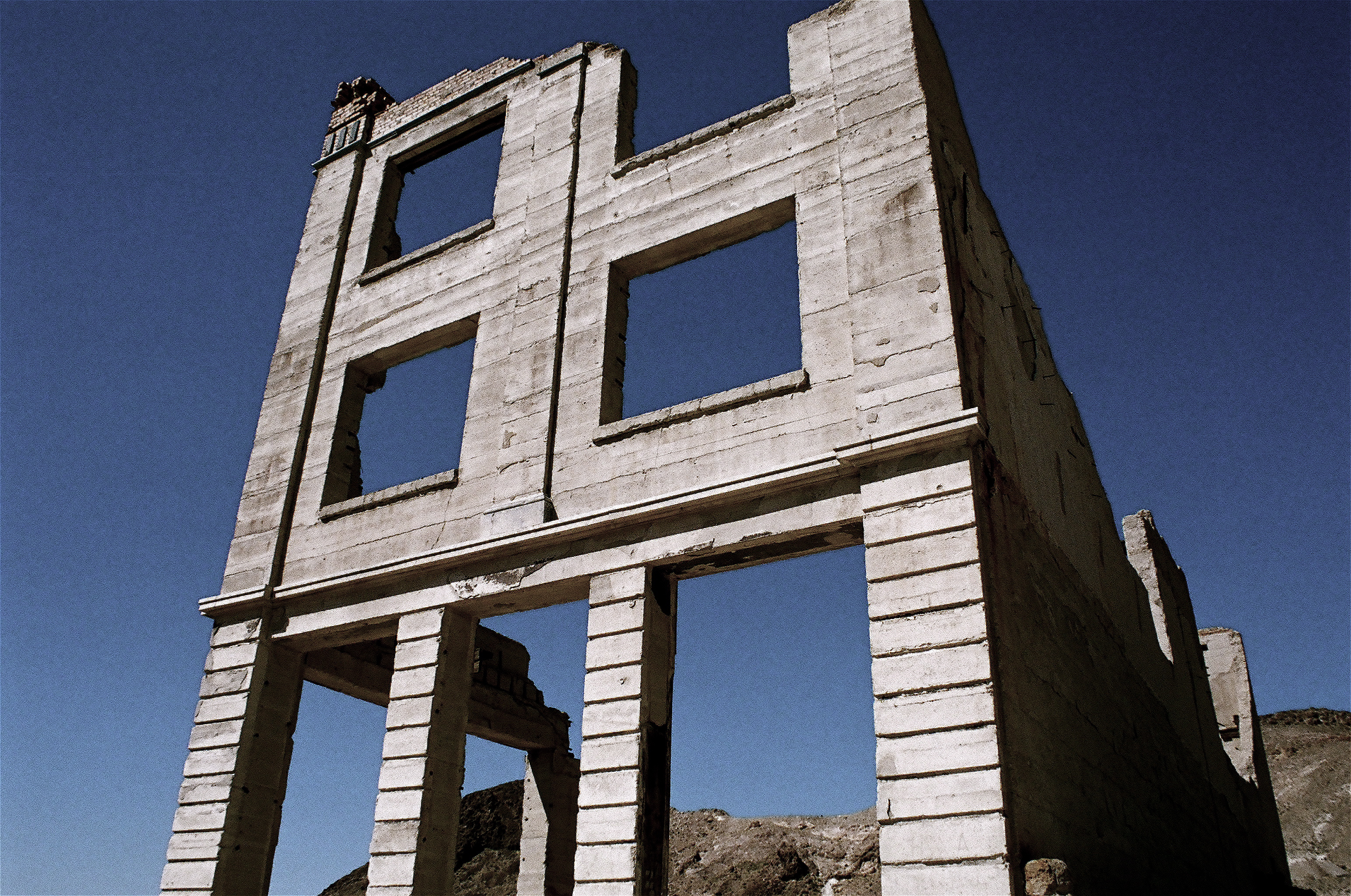
- Ruins of the Cook Bank building in Rhyolite, Nevada
- Etymology: rhyolite, a type of volcanic rock
- Location within the state of Nevada Location within the United States
- Coordinates: 36°54′14″N 116°49′45″W
- Country: United States
- State: Nevada
- County: Nye
- Established: 1905; 121 years ago
- Elevation: 3,819 ft (1,164 m)

Population (1907–08)
  - Total: ~ 3,500 to 5,000
- Time zone: UTC-8 (Pacific (PST))
  - Summer (DST): UTC-7 (PDT)

Rhyolite is a ghost town in Nye County, Nevada, United States. It is in the Bullfrog Hills, about 120 miles (190 km) northwest of Las Vegas, near the eastern boundary of Death Valley National Park.

The town began in early 1905 as one of several mining camps that sprang up after a prospecting discovery in the surrounding hills. During an ensuing gold rush, thousands of gold-seekers, developers, miners and service providers flocked to the Bullfrog Mining District. Many settled in Rhyolite, which lay in a sheltered desert basin near the region's biggest producer, the Montgomery-Shoshone Mine.

Industrialist Charles M. Schwab bought the Montgomery-Shoshone Mine in 1906 and invested heavily in infrastructure, including piped water, electric lines and railroad transportation, that served the town as well as the mine. By 1907, Rhyolite had electric lights, water mains, telephones, newspapers, a hospital, a school, an opera house, and a stock exchange. Published estimates of the town's peak population vary widely, but scholarly sources generally place it in a range between 3,500 and 5,000 in 1907–08.

Rhyolite declined almost as rapidly as it rose. After the richest ore was exhausted, production fell. The 1906 San Francisco earthquake and the financial panic of 1907 made it more difficult to raise development capital. In 1908, investors in the Montgomery-Shoshone Mine, concerned that it was overvalued, ordered an independent study. When the study's findings proved unfavorable, the company's stock value crashed, further restricting funding. By the end of 1910, the mine was operating at a loss, and it closed in 1911. By this time, many out-of-work miners had moved elsewhere, and Rhyolite's population dropped well below 1,000. By 1920, it was close to zero.

After 1920, Rhyolite and its ruins became a tourist attraction and a setting for motion pictures. Most of its buildings crumbled, were salvaged for building materials, or were moved to nearby Beatty or other towns, although the railway depot and a house made chiefly of empty bottles were repaired and preserved. From 1988 to 1998, three companies operated a profitable open-pit mine at the base of Ladd Mountain, about 1 mile (1.6 km) south of Rhyolite. The Goldwell Open Air Museum lies on private property just south of the ghost town, which is on property overseen by the Bureau of Land Management.

== Names ==
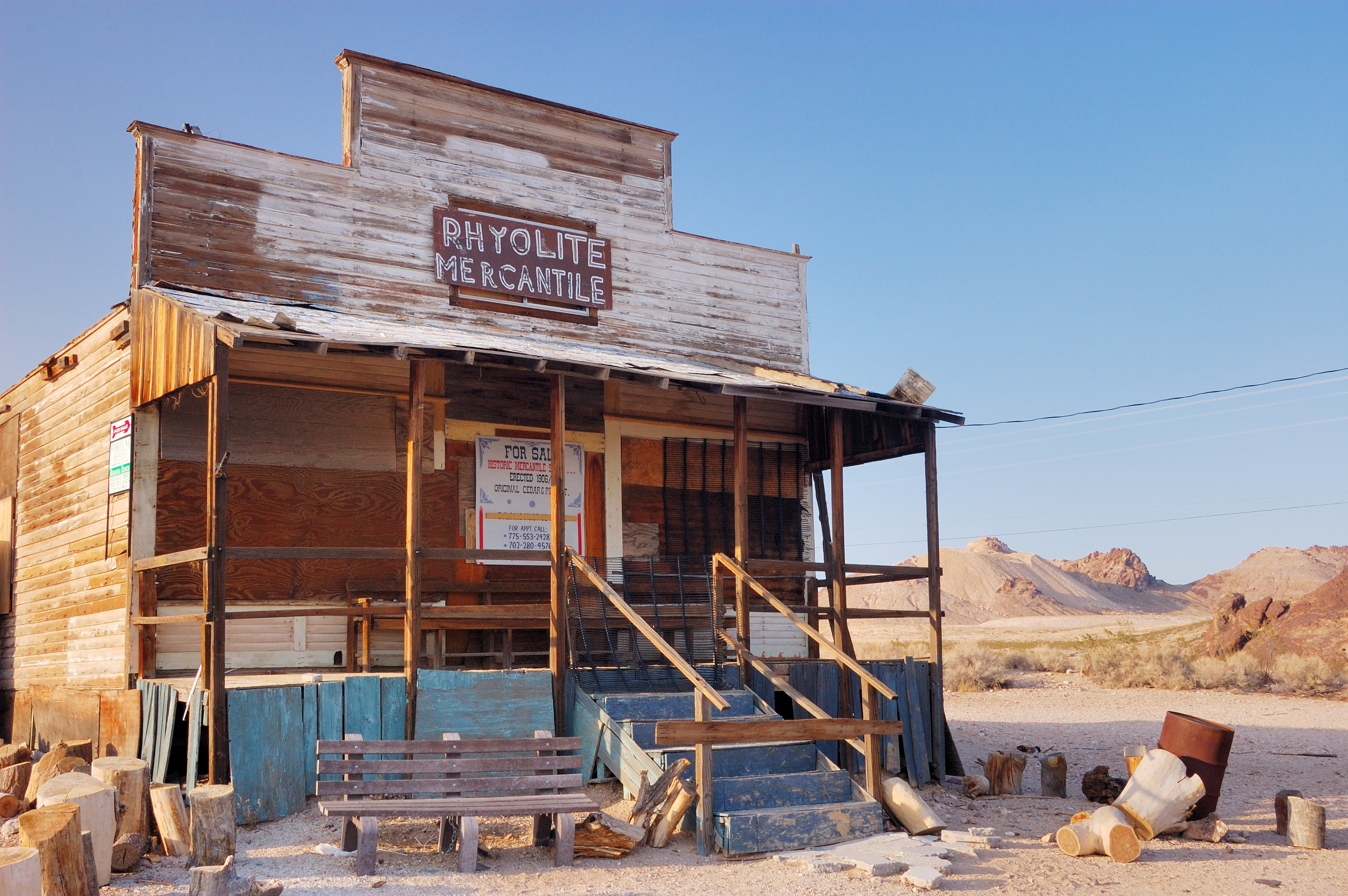
Rhyolite Mercantile, a general store built in 1906 that burned to the ground in September 2014 after being hit by lightning (image taken circa 2007).

The town is named for rhyolite, an igneous rock composed of light-colored silicates, usually buff to pink and occasionally light gray. It belongs to the same rock class, felsic, as granite but is much less common. The Amargosa River, which flows through nearby Beatty, gets its name from the Spanish word for "bitter", amargo. In its course, the river takes up large amounts of salts, which give it a bitter taste.

"Bullfrog" was the name Frank "Shorty" Harris and Ernest "Ed" Cross, the prospectors who started the Bullfrog gold rush, gave to their mine. As quoted by Robert D. McCracken in A History of Beatty, Nevada, Harris said during a 1930 interview for Westways magazine, "The rock was green, almost like turquoise, spotted with big chunks of yellow metal, and looked a lot like the back of a frog." The Bullfrog Mining District, the Bullfrog Hills, the town of Bullfrog, and other geographical entities in the region took their name from the Bullfrog Mine.

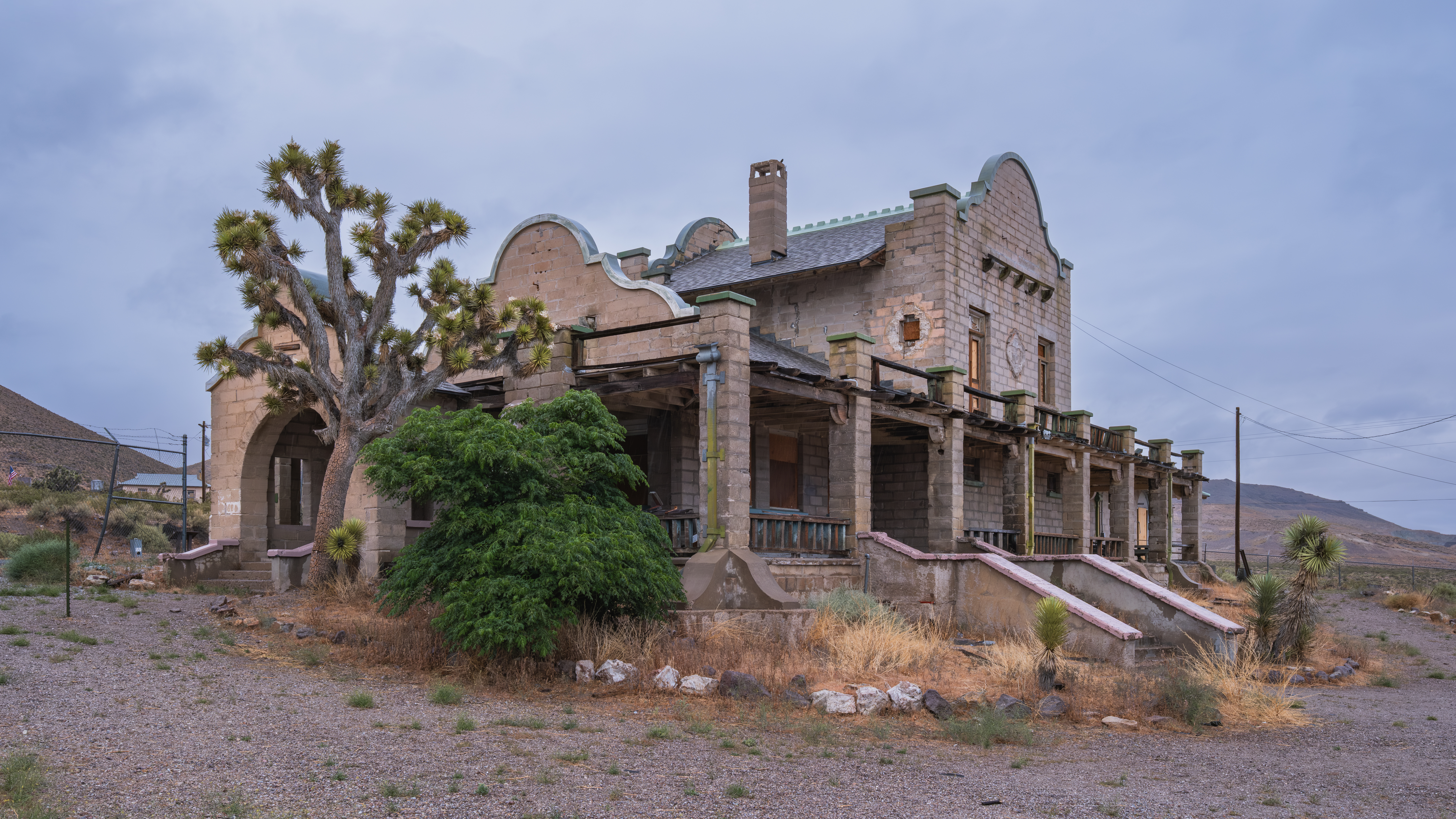
The town's former railway station (Las Vegas and Tonopah Railroad) in April 2026

"Bullfrog" became so popular that Giant Bullfrog, Bullfrog Merger, Bullfrog Apex, Bullfrog Annex, Bullfrog Gold Dollar, Bullfrog Mogul, and most of the district's other 200 or so mining companies included "Bullfrog" in their names. The name persisted and, decades later, was given to the short-lived Bullfrog County.

Beatty is named after "Old Man" Montillus (Montillion) Murray Beatty, a Civil War veteran and miner who bought a ranch along the Amargosa River just north of what became the town of Beatty. In 1906, he sold the ranch to the Bullfrog Water, Power, and Light Company. "Shoshone" in "Montgomery-Shoshone Mine" refers to the Western Shoshone people indigenous to the region. In about 1875, the Shoshone had six camps along the Amargosa River near Beatty. The total population of these camps was 29, and because game was scarce, they subsisted largely on seeds, bulbs and plants gathered throughout the region, including the Bullfrog Hills.

== Geology ==
The Bullfrog Hills are at the western edge of the southwestern Nevada volcanic field. Extensionally faulted volcanic rocks, ranging in age from about 13.3 million years to about 7.6 million years, overlie the region's Paleozoic sedimentary rocks. The prevailing rocks, which contain the ore deposits, are a series of rhyolitic lava flows that built to a combined thickness of about 8,000 feet (2,400 m) above the more ancient rock.

After the flows ceased, tectonic stresses fractured the area into many separate fault blocks. Most of these blocks tilt to the east, and the horizontal banding of individual flows shows clearly on their western scarps. Within the blocks, the ore deposits tend to occur in nearly vertical mineralized faults or fault zones in the rhyolite. Most of the lodes in the Bullfrog Hills are not simple veins but rather fissure zones with many stringers of vein material.

== Geography and climate ==
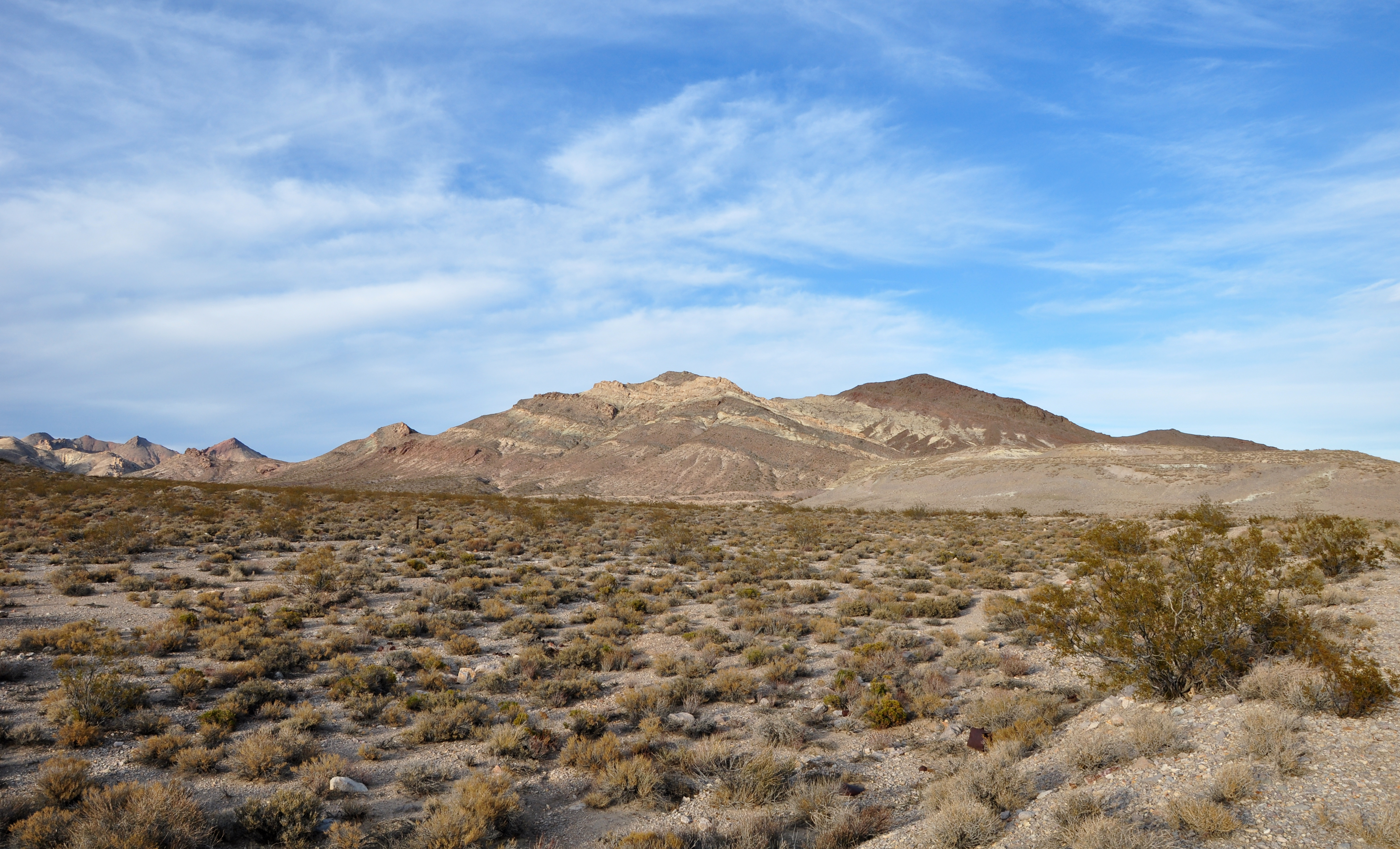
Amargosa Desert and Bullfrog Hills near Rhyolite

Rhyolite is at the northern end of the Amargosa Desert in Nye County in the U.S. state of Nevada. Nestled in the Bullfrog Hills, about 120 miles (190 km) northwest of Las Vegas, it is about 60 miles (97 km) south of Goldfield, and 90 miles (140 km) south of Tonopah. Roughly 4 miles (6.4 km) to the east lie Beatty and the Amargosa River. To the west, roughly 5 miles (8.0 km) from Rhyolite, the Funeral and Grapevine Mountains of the Amargosa Range rise between the Amargosa Desert in Nevada and Death Valley in California. State Route 374, passing about 0.75 miles (1.21 km) south of Rhyolite, links Beatty to Death Valley via Daylight Pass. Rhyolite is about 25 miles (40 km) west of Yucca Mountain and the proposed Yucca Mountain nuclear waste repository, which is adjacent to the Nevada Test Site.

Bordered on three sides by ridges but open to the south, the ghost town is at 3,800 feet (1,200 m) above sea level. The high points of the ridges are Ladd Mountain to the east, Sutherland Mountain to the west, and Busch Peak to the north. Sawtooth Mountain, the highest point in the Bullfrog Hills, rises to 6,002 feet (1,829 m) above sea level about 3 miles (4.8 km) northwest of Rhyolite. The hills form a barrier between the Amargosa Desert and Sarcobatus Flat to the north. Most of the primary mining communities in the Beatty–Rhyolite area during the gold-rush boom of 1904–08 were either in or on the edge of the Bullfrog Hills. Of these and many smaller towns and camps in the Bullfrog district, only Beatty survived as a populated place. Prior to its demise, the rival town of Bullfrog lay about 0.75 miles (1.21 km) southwest of Rhyolite, and the Montgomery-Shoshone Mine was on the north side of Montgomery Mountain, about 1.5 miles (2.4 km) northeast of Rhyolite.

Nevada's main climatic features are bright sunshine, low annual precipitation, heavy snowfall in the higher mountains, clean, dry air, and large daily temperature ranges. Strong surface heating occurs by day and rapid cooling by night, and usually even the hottest days have cool nights. The average percentage of possible sunshine in southern Nevada is more than 80 percent. Sunshine and low humidity in this region account for an average evaporation, as measured in evaporation pans, of more than 100 inches (2,500 mm) of water a year.

Beatty, about 500 feet (150 m) lower in elevation than Rhyolite, receives only about 6 inches (152 mm) of precipitation a year. July is the hottest month in Beatty, when the average high temperature is 97 °F (36 °C) and the average low is 61 °F (16 °C). December and January are the coolest months with an average high of 54 °F (12 °C) and an average low of 27 °F (−3 °C) in December and 28 °F (−2 °C) in January. Rhyolite is high enough in the hills to have relatively cool summers, and it has relatively mild winters. However, it is far from sources of water.

== History ==
=== Boom ===
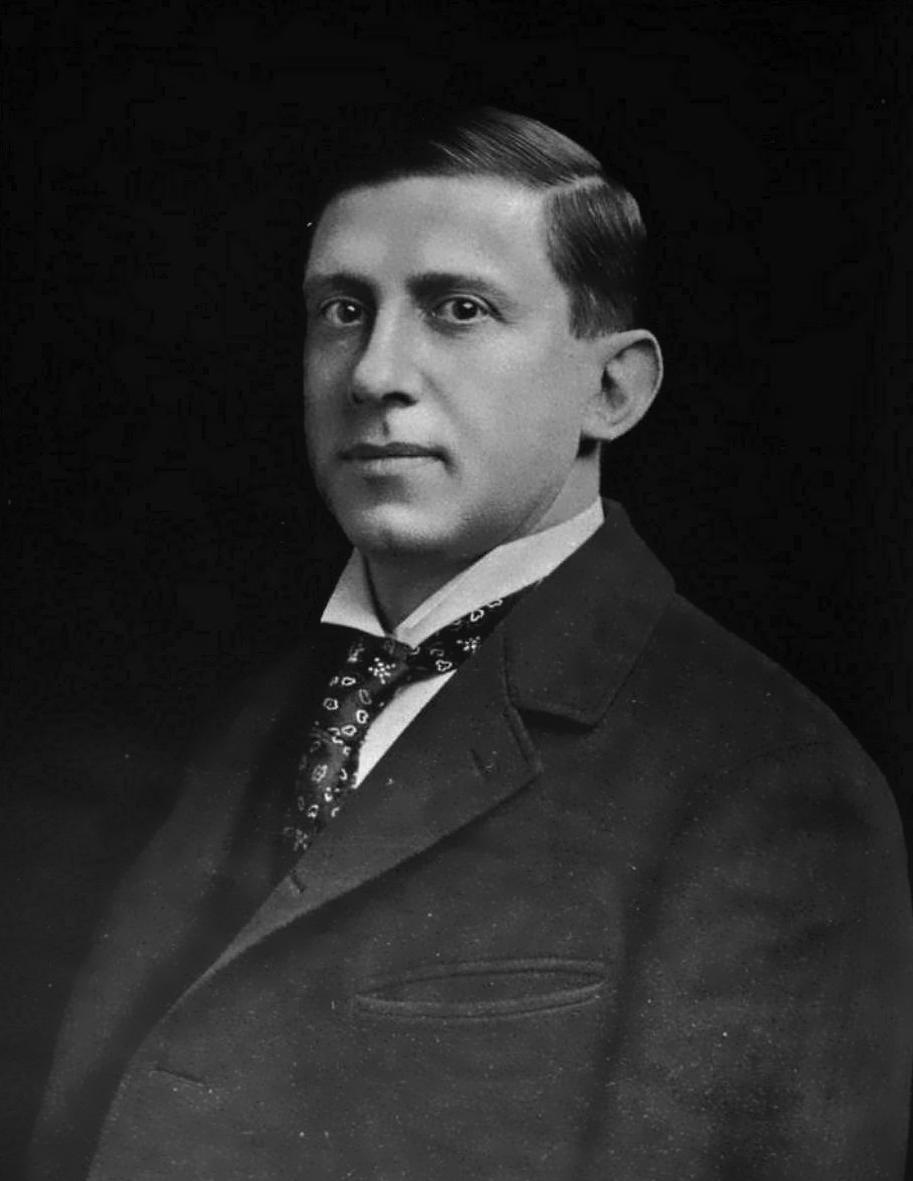
Charles M. Schwab (portrait, 1901) invested heavily in the Montgomery-Shoshone Mine.

On August 9, 1904, Cross and Harris found gold on the south side of a southwestern Nevada hill later called Bullfrog Mountain. Assays of ore samples from the site suggested values up to $3,000 a ton, or about $107,000 a ton in 2025 dollars when adjusted for inflation. Word of the discovery spread to Tonopah and beyond, and soon thousands of hopeful prospectors and speculators rushed to what became known as the Bullfrog Mining District.

Within the district, gold rush settlements quickly arose near the mines, and Rhyolite became the largest. It sprang up near the most promising discovery, the Montgomery-Shoshone Mine, which in February 1905 produced ores assayed as high as $16,000 a ton, equivalent to $573,000 a ton in 2025. Starting as a two-man camp in January 1905, Rhyolite became a town of 1,200 people in two weeks and reached a population of 2,500 by June 1905. By then it had 50 saloons, 35 gambling tables, cribs for prostitution, 19 lodging houses, 16 restaurants, half a dozen barbers, a public bath house, and a weekly newspaper, the Rhyolite Herald. Four daily stage coaches connected Goldfield, 60 miles (97 km) to the north, and Rhyolite. Rival auto lines ferried people between Rhyolite and Goldfield and the rail station in Las Vegas in Pope-Toledos, White Steamers, and other touring cars.

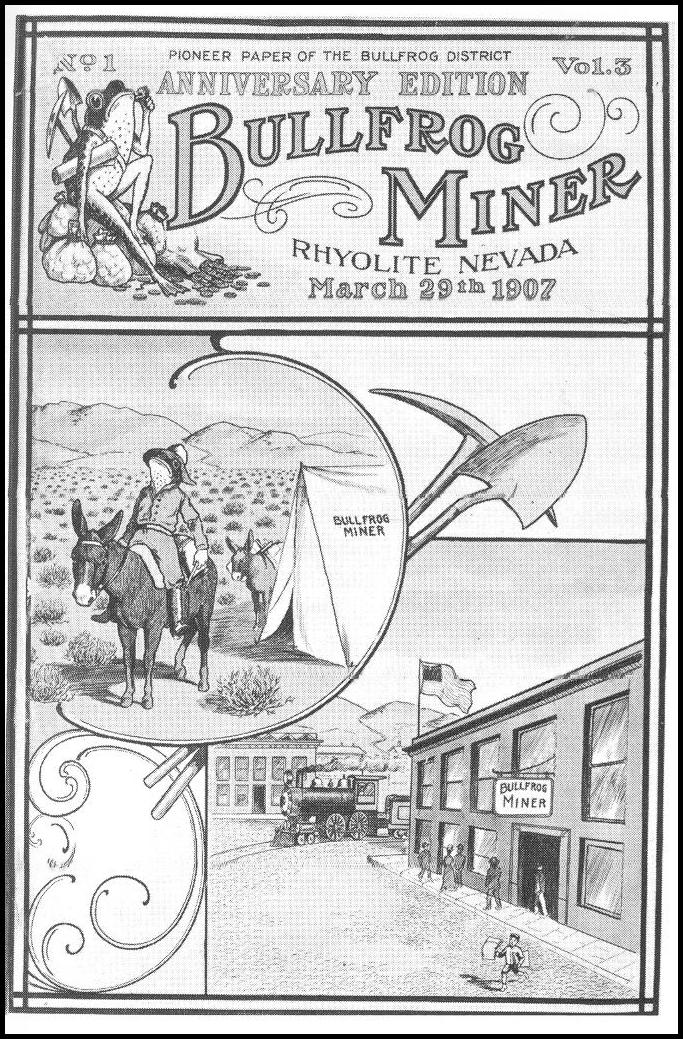
Bullfrog Miner, 1907

Ernest Alexander "Bob" Montgomery, the original owner, and his partners sold the mine to industrialist Charles M. Schwab in February 1906. Schwab expanded the operation on a grand scale, hiring workers, opening new tunnels and drifts, and building a huge mill to process the ore. He had water piped in, paid to have an electric line run 100 miles (160 km) from a hydroelectric plant at the foot of the Sierra Nevada mountain range to Rhyolite, and contracted with the Las Vegas and Tonopah Railroad to run a spur line to the mine. Three railroads eventually served Rhyolite. The first was the Las Vegas and Tonopah Railroad (LVTR), which began running regular trains to the city on December 14, 1906. Its depot, built in California-mission style, cost about $130,000, equivalent to about $4,660,000 in 2025. About a half-year later, the Bullfrog Goldfield Railroad (BGR) began regular service from the north. By December 1907, the Tonopah and Tidewater Railroad (TTR) began service to Rhyolite on tracks leased from the BGR. The TTR was built to reach the borax-bearing colemanite beds in Death Valley as well as the gold fields.

By 1907, about 4,000 people lived in Rhyolite, according to Richard E. Lingenfelter in Death Valley & the Amargosa: A Land of Illusion. Russell R. Elliott cites an estimated population of 5,000 in 1907–08 in Nevada's Twentieth-Century Mining Boom, noting that "accurate population figures during the boom are impossible to obtain". Alan H. Patera in Rhyolite: The Boom Years states published estimates of the peak population have been "as high as 6,000 or 8,000, but the town itself never claimed more than 3,500 through its newspapers". The newspapers estimated that 6,000 people lived in the Bullfrog mining district, which included the towns of Rhyolite, Bullfrog, Gold Center, and Beatty as well as camps at the major mines.

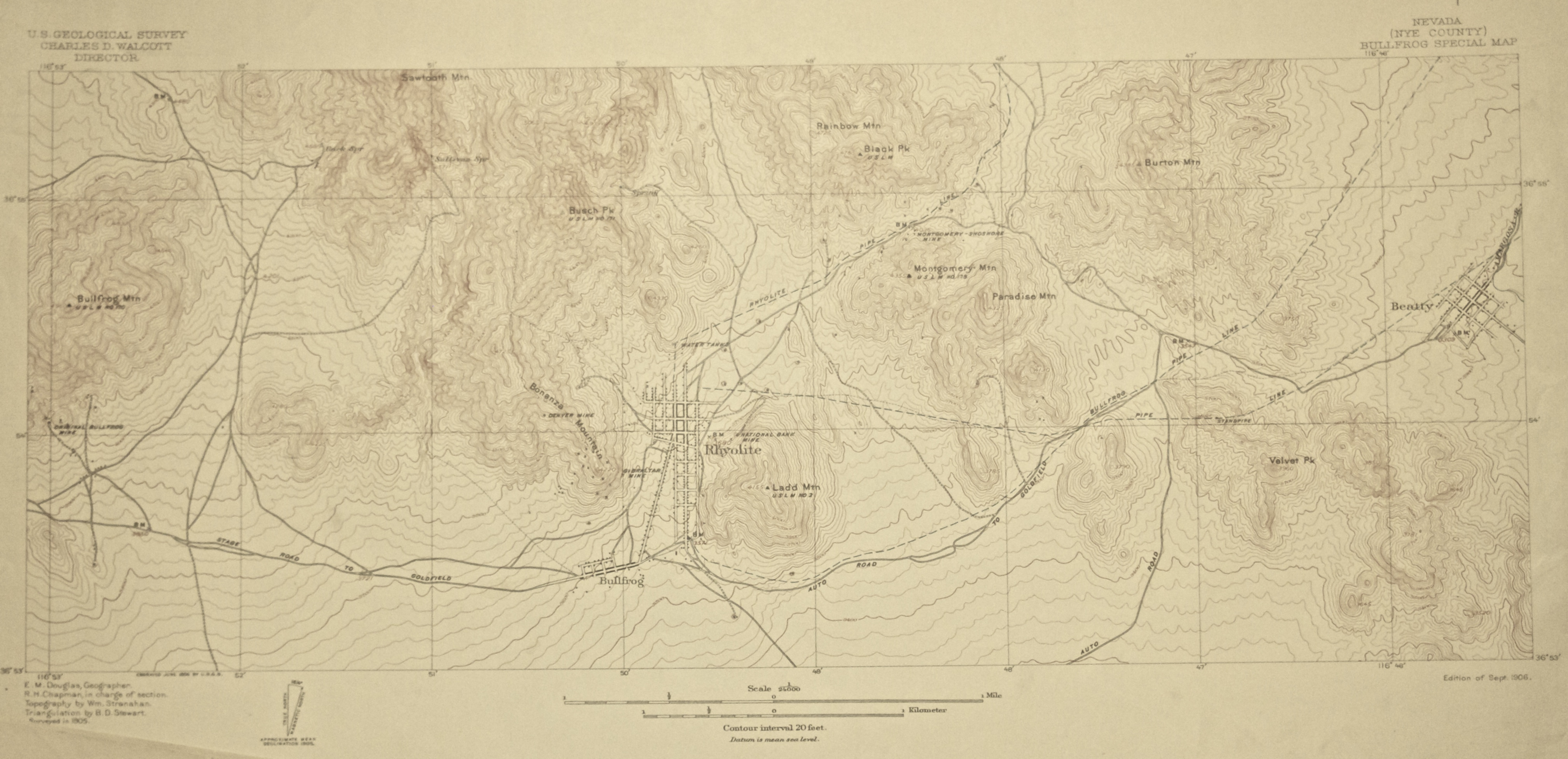
1:24,000 scale map of Rhyolite surveyed in 1905

Rhyolite in 1907 had concrete sidewalks, electric lights, water mains, telephone and telegraph lines, daily and weekly newspapers, a monthly magazine, police and fire departments, a hospital, school, train station and railway depot, at least three banks, a stock exchange, an opera house, a public swimming pool and two formal church buildings. Most prominent was the three-story John S. Cook and Co. Bank on Golden Street. Finished in 1908, it cost more than $90,000, equivalent to $3,220,000 in 2025. Much of the cost went for Italian marble stairs, imported stained-glass windows, and other luxuries. The building housed brokerage offices, and a post office, as well as the bank. Other large buildings included the train depot, the three-story Overbury Bank building, and the two-story eight-room school. A miner named Tom T. Kelly built the Bottle House in February 1906 from 50,000 discarded beer and liquor bottles. Another building housed the Rhyolite Mining Stock Exchange, which opened on March 25, 1907, with 125 members, including brokers from New York, Philadelphia, Los Angeles, and other large cities. The small, modestly equipped storefront listed shares of 74 Bullfrog companies and a similar number of companies in nearby mining districts. Sixty thousand shares changed hands on the first day, and by the end of the second week the number had topped 750,000.

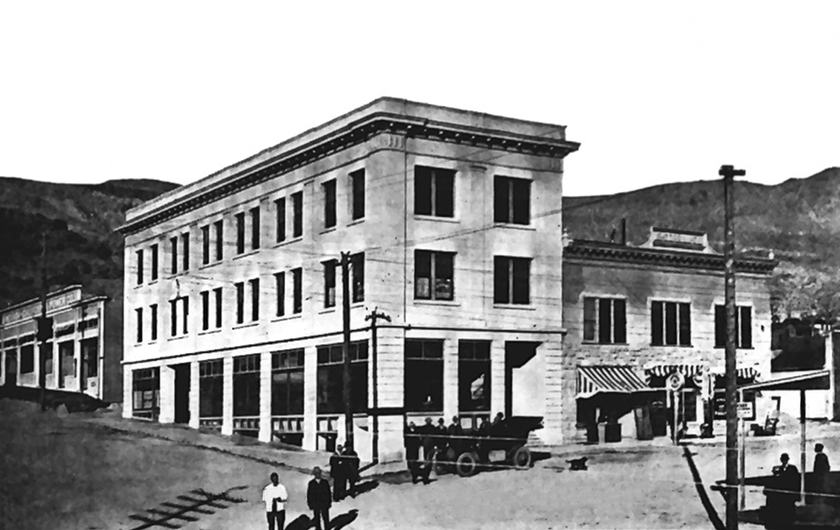
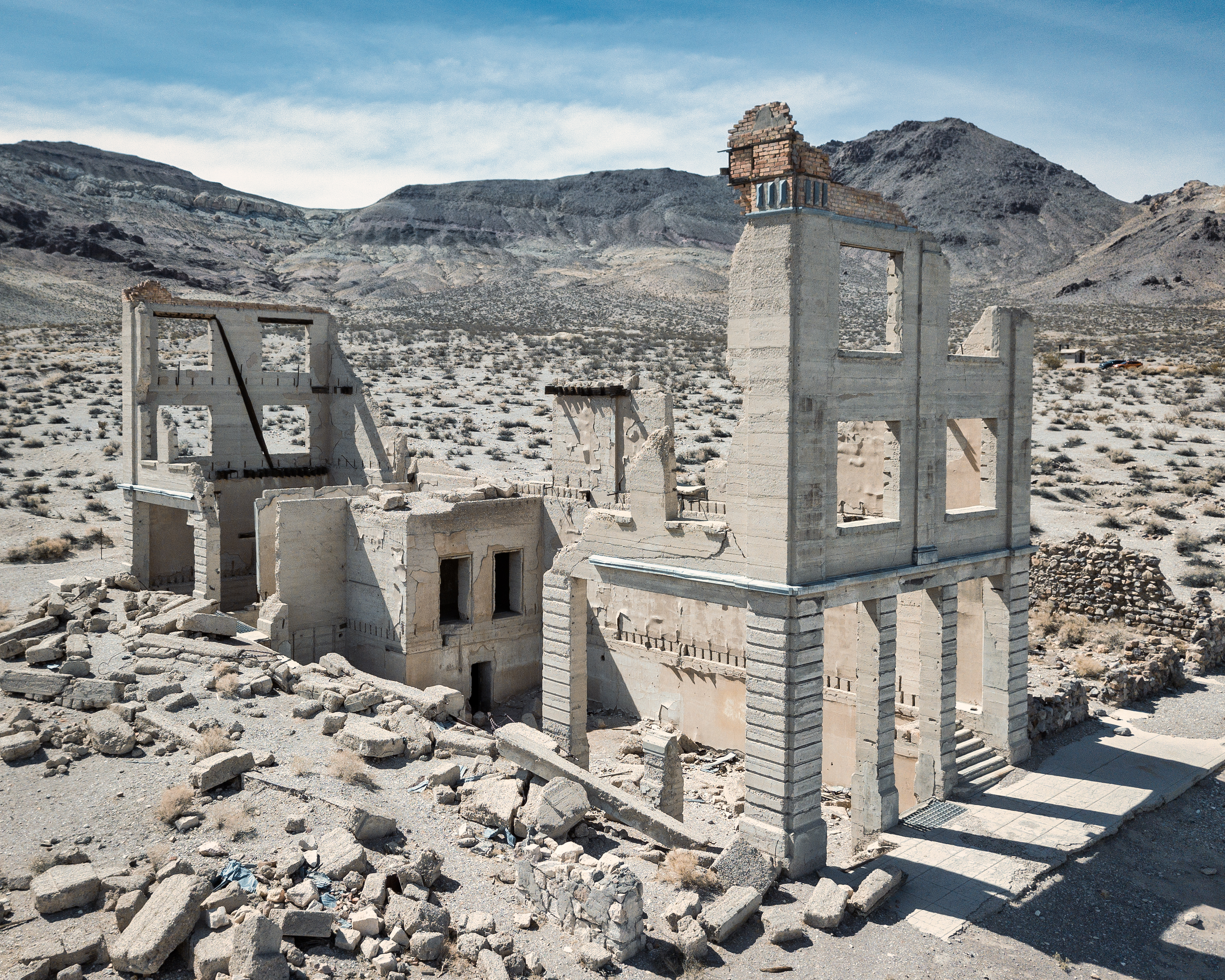
The Cook Bank building in 1908 and 2022

=== Bust ===
Although the mine produced more than $1 million (equivalent to about $24 million in 2009) in bullion in its first three years, its shares declined from $23 a share (in historical dollars) to less than $3. In February 1908, a committee of minority stockholders, suspecting that the mine was overvalued, hired a British mining engineer to conduct an inspection. The engineer's report was unfavorable, and news of this caused a sudden further decline in share value from $3 to 75 cents. Schwab expressed disappointment when he learned that "the wonderful high-grade [ore] that had brought [the mine] fame was confined to only a few stringers and that what he had actually bought was a large low-grade mine."

Although the mine was still profitable, by 1909 no new ore was being discovered, and the value of the remaining ore steadily decreased. In 1910, the mine operated at a loss for most of the year, and on March 14, 1911, it was closed. By then, the stock, which had fallen to 10 cents a share, slid to 4 cents and was dropped from the exchanges.

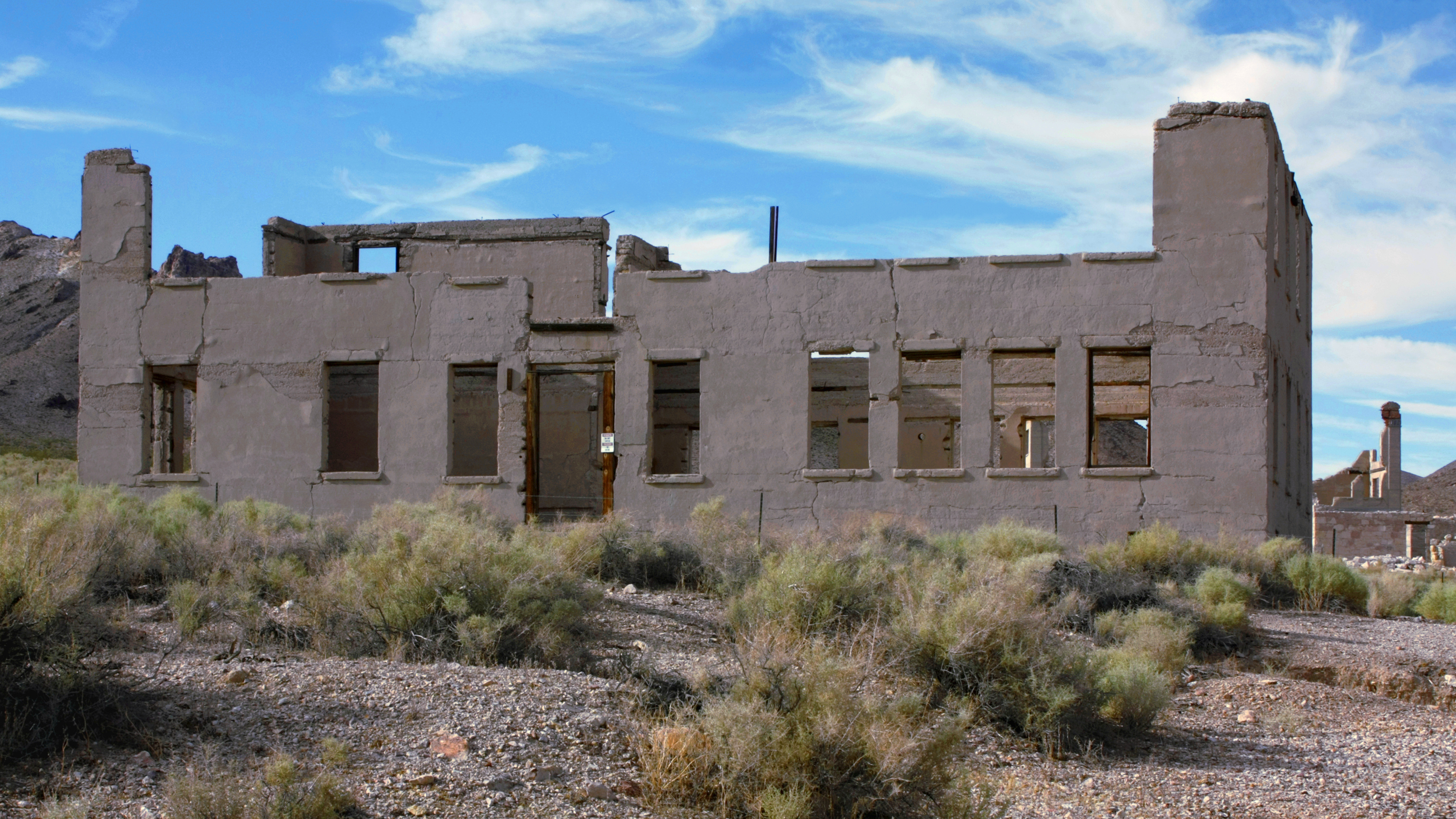
Rhyolite's two-story, eight-room school building in 2011

Rhyolite began to decline before the final closing of the mine. At roughly the same time that the Bullfrog mines were running out of high-grade ore, the 1906 San Francisco earthquake diverted capital to California while interrupting rail service, and the financial panic of 1907 restricted funding for mine development. As mines in the district reduced production or closed, unemployed miners left Rhyolite to seek work elsewhere, businesses failed, and by 1910, the census reported only 675 residents.

All three banks in the town closed by March 1910. The newspapers, including the Rhyolite Herald, the last to go, all shut down by June 1912. The post office closed in November 1913; the last train left Rhyolite Station in July 1914, and the Nevada-California Power Company turned off the electricity and removed its lines in 1916. Within a year the town was "all but abandoned", and the 1920 census reported a population of only 14. A 1922 motor tour by the Los Angeles Times found only one remaining resident, a 92-year-old man who died in 1924.

Much of Rhyolite's remaining infrastructure became a source of building materials for other towns and mining camps. Whole buildings were moved to Beatty. The Miners' Union Hall in Rhyolite became the Old Town Hall in Beatty, and two-room cabins were moved and reassembled as multi-room homes. Parts of many buildings were used to build a Beatty school.

=== Ghost town ===
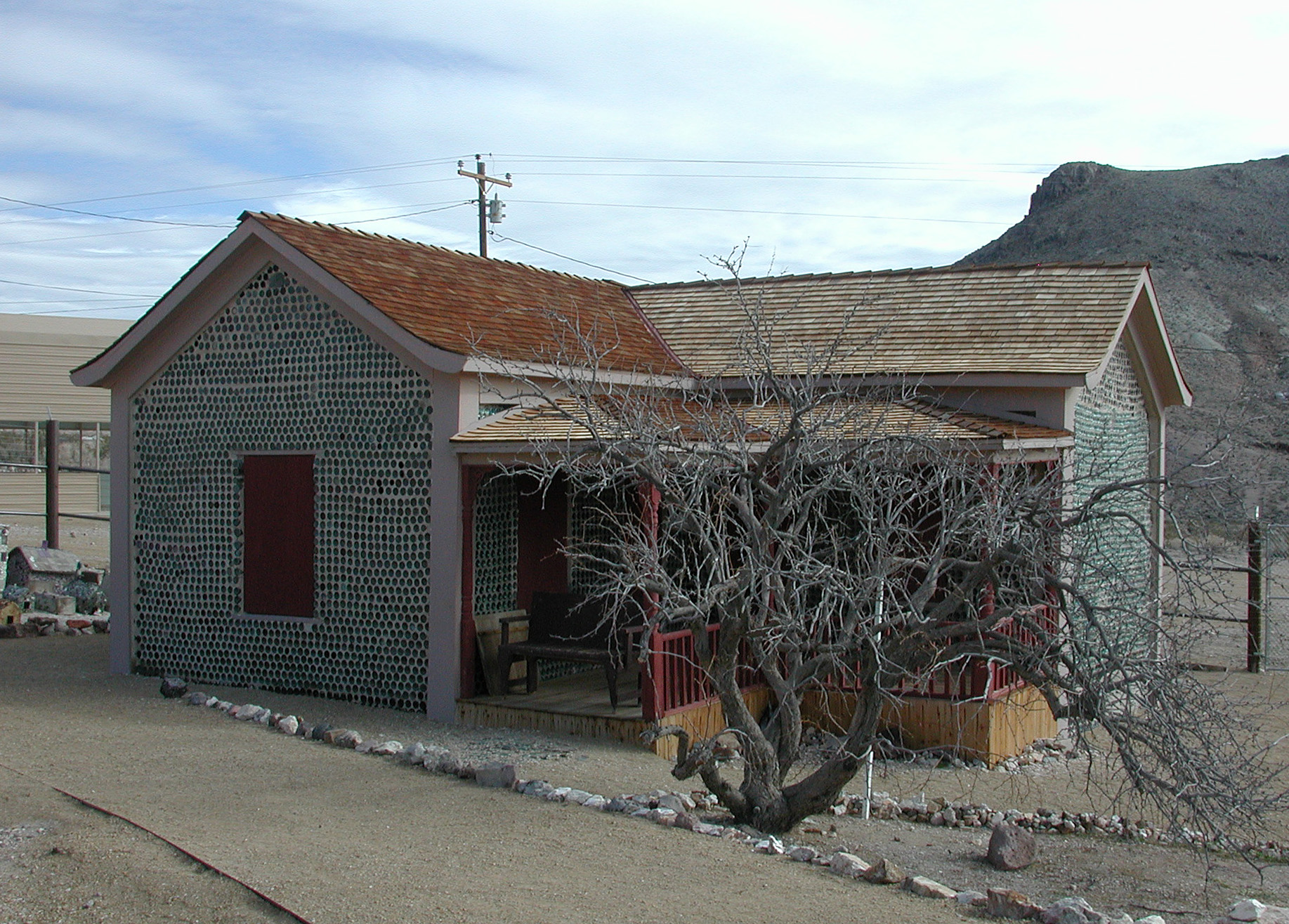
Most of Rhyolite lies in ruins, but the Bottle House is an exception.

The Rhyolite historic townsite, maintained by the Bureau of Land Management, is "one of the most photographed ghost towns in the West". Ruins include the railroad depot and other buildings, and the Bottle House, which the Famous Players Lasky Corporation, the parent of Paramount Pictures, restored in 1925 for the filming of a silent movie, The Air Mail. The ruins of the Cook Bank building were used in the 1964 film The Reward and again in 2004 for the filming of The Island. Orion Pictures used Rhyolite for its 1988 science-fiction movie Cherry 2000 depicting the collapse of American society. Six-String Samurai (1998) was another movie using Rhyolite as a setting. The Rhyolite-Bullfrog cemetery, with many wooden headboards, is slightly south of Rhyolite.

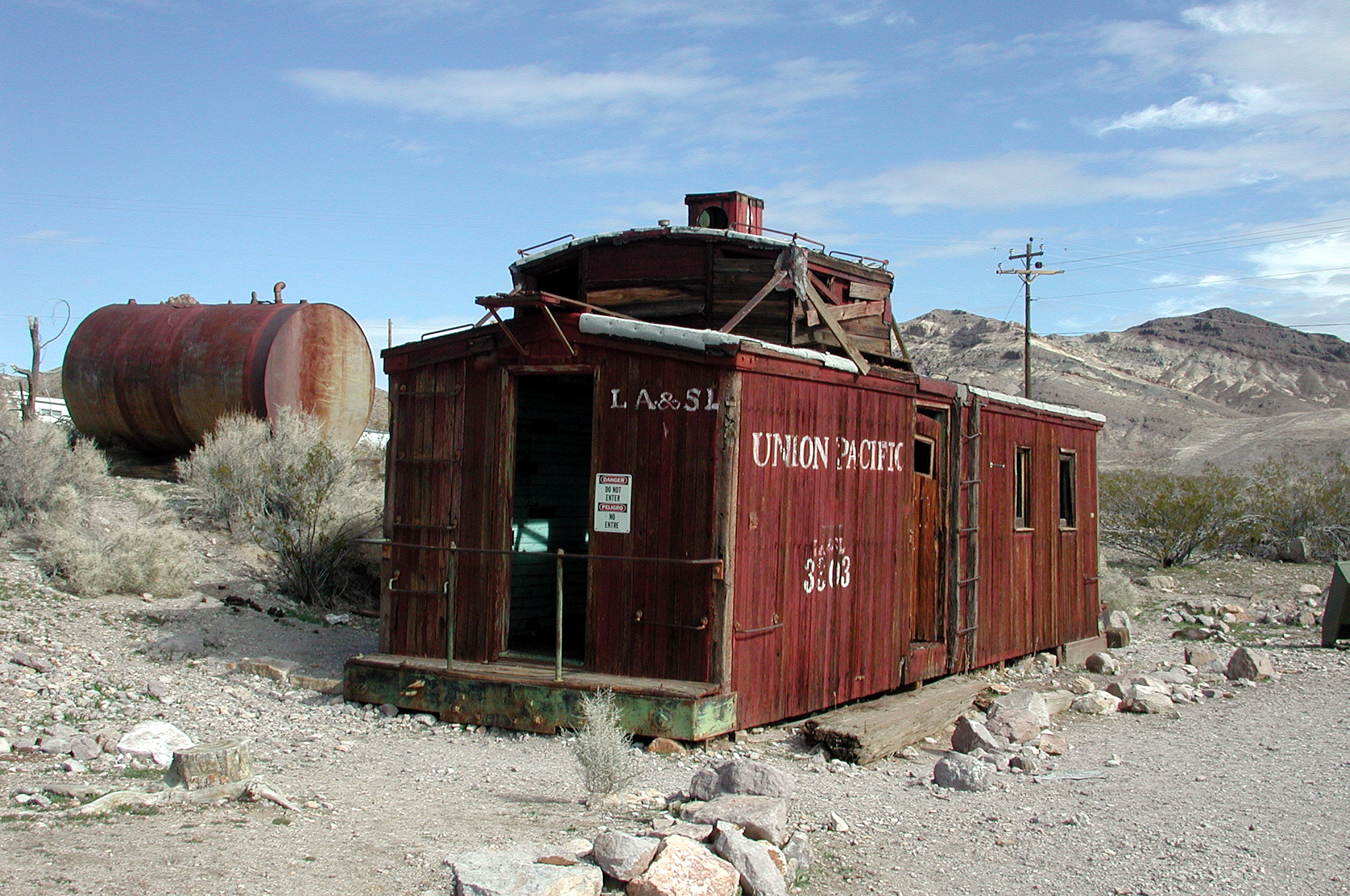
A caboose formerly used as a gas station

Tourism flourished in and near Death Valley in the 1920s, and souvenir sellers set up tables in Rhyolite to sell rocks and bottles on weekends. In the 1930s, Revert Mercantile of Beatty acquired a Union Oil distributorship, built a gas station in Beatty, and supplied pumps in other locations, including Rhyolite. The Rhyolite service station consisted of an old caboose, a storage tank, and a pump, managed by a local owner. In 1937, the train depot became a casino and bar called the Rhyolite Ghost Casino, which was later turned into a small museum and curio shop that remained open into the 1970s. In 1984, Belgian artist Albert Szukalski created his sculpture The Last Supper on Golden Street near the Rhyolite railway depot. The art became part of the Goldwell Open Air Museum, an outdoor sculpture park near the southern entrance to the ghost town.

=== Barrick Bullfrog Mine ===
Mining in and around Rhyolite after 1920 consisted mainly of working old tailings until a new mine opened in 1988 on the south side of Ladd Mountain. A company known as Bond Gold built an open-pit mine and mill at the site, about 1 mile (1.6 km) south of Rhyolite along State Route 374. LAC Minerals acquired the mine from Bond in 1989 and established an underground mine there in 1991 after a new body of ore called the North Extension was discovered. Barrick Gold acquired LAC Minerals in 1994 and continued to extract and process ore at what became known as the Barrick Bullfrog Mine until the end of 1998. The mine used a chemical extraction process known as vat leaching involving the use of a weak cyanide solution. The process, like heap leaching, makes it possible to process ore profitably that otherwise would not qualify as mill-grade. Over its entire life, the mine processed about 2,800,000 short tons (2,500,000 t) of ore and produced about 690,000 ounces (20,000 kg) of gold.

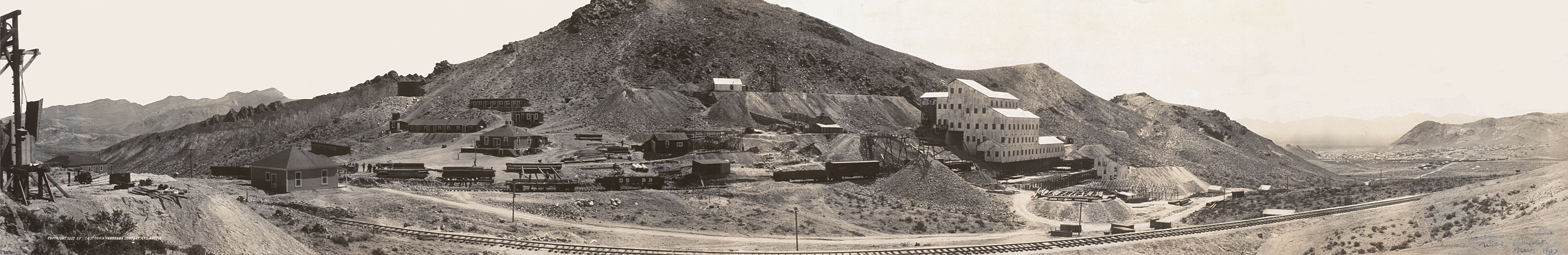
Panorama of the Montgomery-Shoshone Mine and its mill as they appeared in early 1907. Rhyolite is in the background to the far right.

== See also ==
- List of ghost towns in Nevada
