= Centaury =

Centaury is a common name for several plants and may refer to:

- Centaurea, a genus in the Asteraceae containing species sometimes called centaury
- Centaurium, a genus in the Gentianaceae containing species commonly called centaury
  - Gyrandra, a genus formerly included in Centaurium, with species commonly called centaury
  - Schenkia, a genus formerly included in Centaurium, with species commonly called centaury
  - Zeltnera, a New World genus formerly included in Centaurium, with species commonly called centaury
- Cheirolophus crassifolius, a species in the Asteraceae commonly known as Maltese centaury
- Sabatia, a New World genus in the Gentianaceae containing species sometimes called centaury
