= Hylaeus paumako =

- Hylaeus paumako foraging on kolomana

Scientific classification
- Kingdom: Animalia
- Phylum: Arthropoda
- Clade: Pancrustacea
- Class: Insecta
- Order: Hymenoptera
- Family: Colletidae
- Genus: Hylaeus
- Species: H. paumako

Binomial name
- Hylaeus paumako Magnacca, 2025

Species of bee

Hylaeus paumako is a species of bee endemic to the Hawaiian island of Molokaʻi. It was discovered in a designated conservation and wilderness area in the ahupuaʻa of Mākolelau in 2024 and later described in 2025. The bee is notable as the only known bee species on the island where the males are completely black (Hylaeus are generally yellow-faced). H. paumako is the first new species of bee found on the island of Molokaʻi in over a century.

== Description ==
Hylaeus paumako is small, entirely black and unmarked, and with wings somewhat smoky. Unlike other Hylaeus species on Molokaʻi, the males have no yellow markings. Male and female have the same black coloration unlike other Hylaeus species in Hawaii. The bee was first discovered in early 2024 and described in 2025 by entomologist Karl Magnacca. It is named for the Hawaiian word paumākō, meaning "mourning" or "grief", in reference to the all-black color of the male specimens. Magnacca chose the name to evoke the traditional nomenclature where species that are black are named from the Latin funebris, (of or belonging to a funeral), as an allusion to their color.

== Distribution and habitat ==
There are 64 species of Hylaeus known in the Hawaiian Islands, all of which are thought to descend from a single ancestor that travelled to Hawaii approximately 1 to 1.5 million years ago. Although not easy, this kind of dispersal or colonization is generally considered feasible for several reasons: an inseminated female can store sperm for her entire life; they can travel or be carried to distant locations by wind, or their nest could be carried to the islands upon floating debris. It is believed that as part of the larger, prehistoric island and biogeographic region of Maui Nui (Maui, Molokaʻi, Lānaʻi, and Kahoʻolawe), species of Hylaeus were able to more easily travel between these inner islands due to their proximity, unlike the more isolated islands of Kauaʻi and Hawaiʻi, which have a majority of endemic species of Hylaeus.

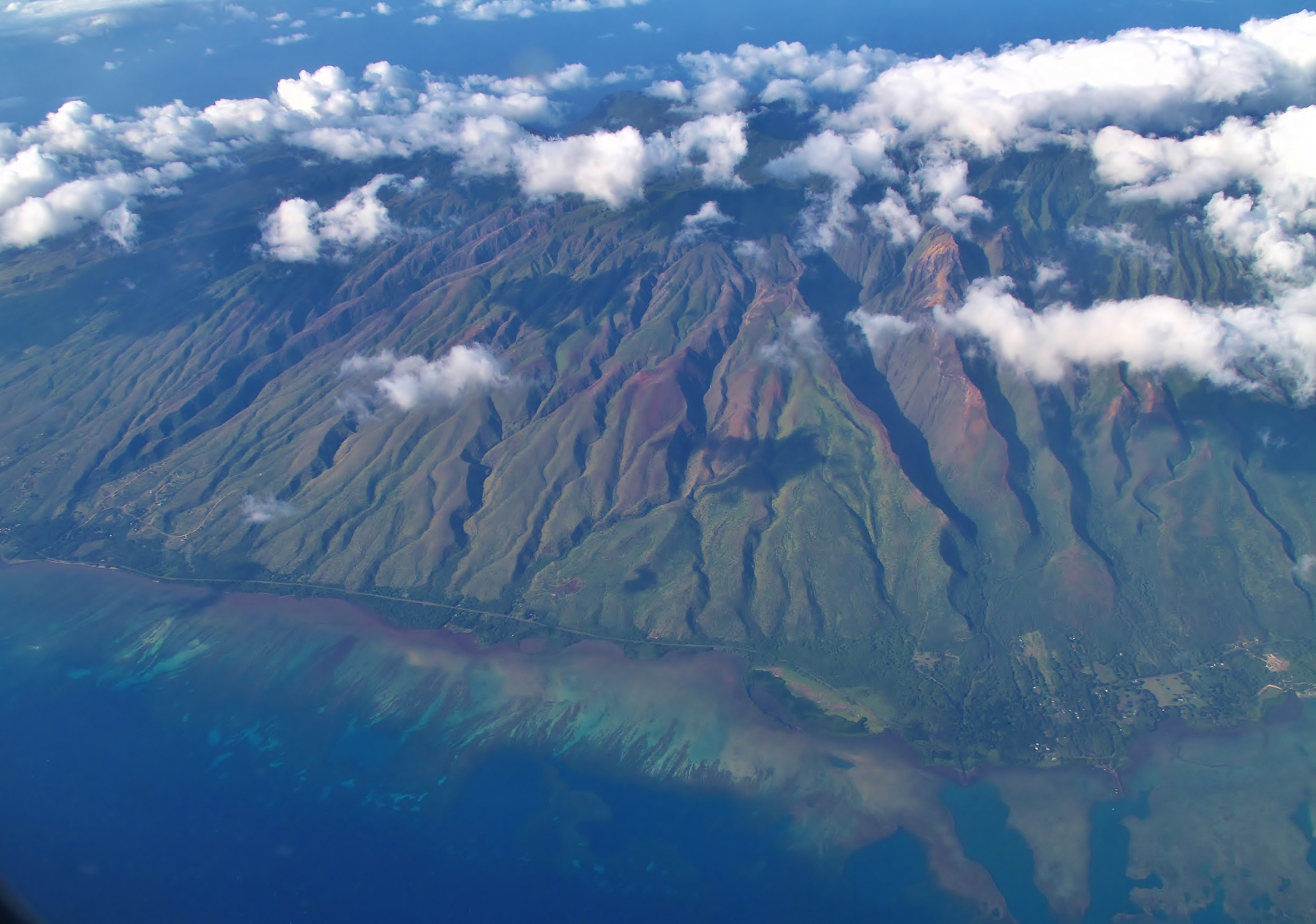
Aerial view of the southern slope of east Moloka‘i while flying over the Pailolo Channel. The bee habitat is located in the ahupuaʻa of Mākolelau at 850 meters (2,790 ft) (center).

Of the 15 species of Hylaeus on the island of Molokaʻi, Hylaeus paumako is thought to be the sole endemic of its kind found so far. It is only found on the southern slopes of the eastern part of the island in the ahupuaʻa of Mākolelau at elevations of around 850 meters (2,790 ft). Mākolelau, located between the ahupuaʻa of Kawela and Kapuaoko‘olau, is a wilderness area in an endangered, priority 1 watershed. It is classified as a high-elevation, dry shrubland and mesic forest habitat. The ahupuaʻa of Mākolelau plays an important role on the island, helping to create freshwater and control erosion while protecting coral reefs below. Mākolelau also serves as a wildlife corridor for endangered birds, bats, and native plants. In 2022, the Division of Forestry and Wildlife (DOFAW), one of ten divisions of the Hawaii Department of Land and Natural Resources (DLNR), acquired 1,045-acres within Mākolelau for the purpose of conservation and restoration. The restoration program preserved the original ecosystem by managing invasive species such as ungulates and non-native plants, and developing firebreaks to prevent wildfires. To help meet these goals, fencing was installed to protect the native plants in the Mākolelau Gulch.

Several years after the restoration, Magnacca, who is also employed by the DNLR's Division of Forestry and Wildlife, participated in a 2024 survey of the Mākolelau conservation area in partnership with the Plant Extinction Prevention Program (PEPP), completing one of the first major insect surveys in the area in the last century. During the survey, he discovered H. paumako foraging on flowers of kolomana (Senna gaudichaudii); the bee is considered a pollinator of that species. The habitat area is located in a gulch with large rocks, medium sized talus boulders, that broke off and accumulated at the bottom. It is believed these rocks might serve as a nesting area for the bee. Females of the species may construct nests in rock crevices or beneath the boulders similar to those of H. rugulosus, who make nests in volcanic rock on the island of Hawaii.

== Hylaeus on Molokaʻi ==
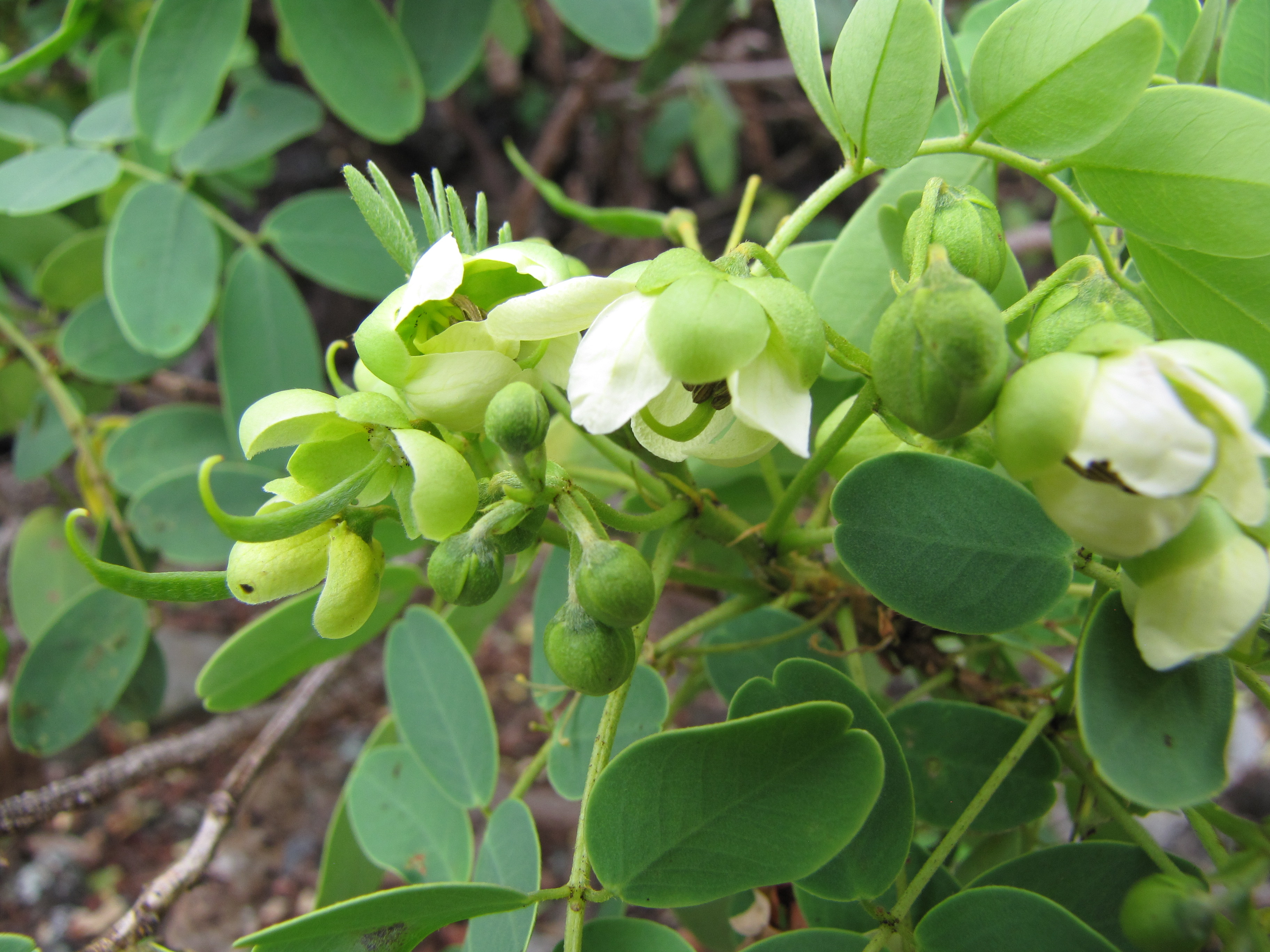
Leaves and flowers of kolomana (Senna gaudichaudii)

The discovery of Hylaeus paumako in 2024 was the first new species of bee found on the island of Molokaʻi in more than a century. During the same survey, H. connectens and H. laetus were also observed for the first time on the island in more than 125 years. The following species of Hylaeus were previously catalogued as extant on Molokaʻi in 2003:

- Hylaeus albonitens (Cockerell, 1905)^{i c g}
- Hylaeus anthracinus (Smith, 1853)^{i c g}
- Hylaeus connectens (Perkins, 1899)^{i c g}
- Hylaeus difficilis (Perkins, 1899)^{i c g}
- Hylaeus facilis (Smith, 1879)^{i c g}
- Hylaeus fuscipennis (Smith, 1879)^{i c g}
- Hylaeus haleakalae (Perkins, 1899)^{i c g}
- Hylaeus hilaris (Smith, 1879)^{i c g}
- Hylaeus laetus (Perkins, 1899)^{i c g}
- Hylaeus longiceps (Perkins, 1899)^{i c g}
- Hylaeus niloticus (Warncke, 1970)^{i c g}
- Hylaeus satelles (Blackburn, 1886)^{i c g}
- Hylaeus unicus (Perkins, 1899)^{i c g}
- Hylaeus volatilis (Smith, 1879)^{i c g}

Data sources: i = ITIS, c = Catalogue of Life, g = GBIF, b = Bugguide.net
