= Beyrich =

Beyrich

== Surname ==
- Notable people with the surname include:
- Franz Beyrich (1887–1961), German politician
- Heinrich Ernst Beyrich (1815–1896), German paleontologist
- Heinrich Karl Beyrich (1796–1834), German botanist

== Places ==
- Barish; old spelling (by Guerin) of this village in Lebanon
