= Reveludden Nature Reserve =

Nature reserve in Stockholm, Sweden

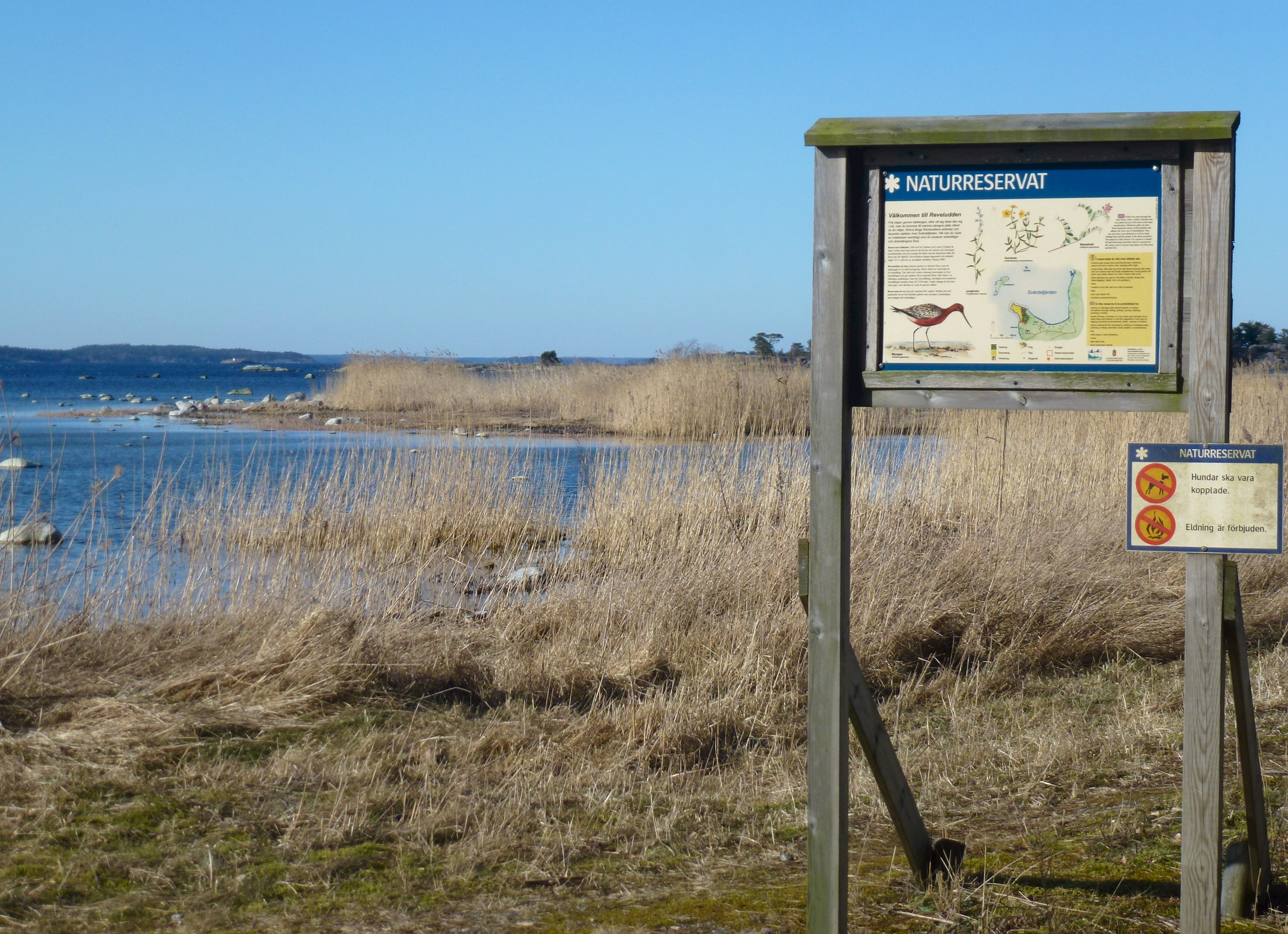

- Location within Stockholm
- Location: Sweden
- Nearest city: Nynäshamn
- Coordinates: 58°48′37″N 17°47′50″E
- Area: 10 ha (25 acres)
- Established: 1966

Reveludden Nature Reserve (Swedish: Reveluddens naturreservat) is a nature reserve in Stockholm County in Sweden.

The nature reserve covers a sandy peninsula in the Baltic Sea with beach meadows and a shallow coastline. It is an important habitat for migratory birds who rest here between July and September. The coastal meadows also provide a habitat for several unusual plants, including Gentianella uliginosa, sea thrift, Centaurium littorale, sea plantain and sea kale among others.
