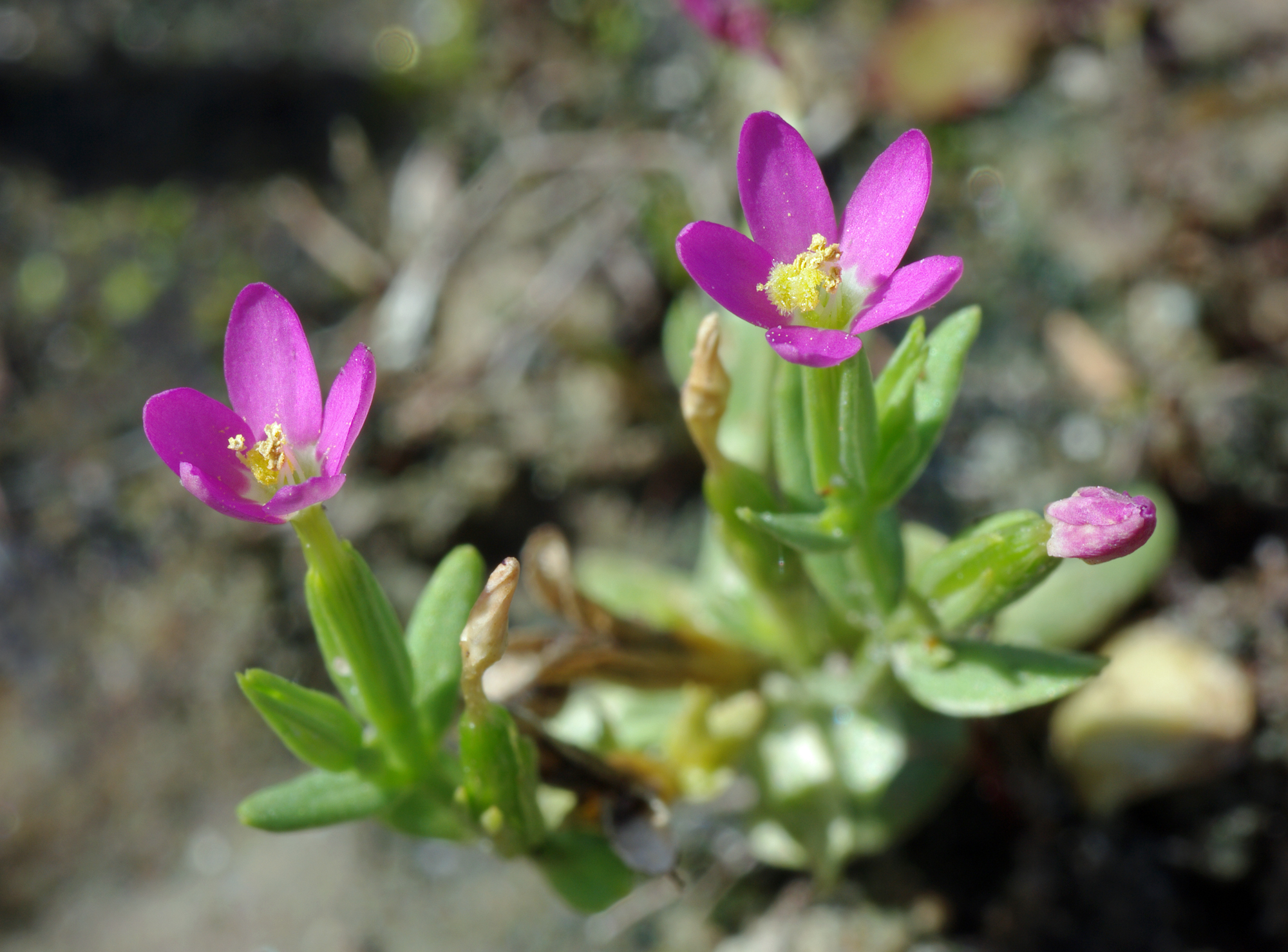

Conservation status
- Least Concern (IUCN 3.1)

Scientific classification
- Kingdom: Plantae
- Clade: Tracheophytes
- Clade: Angiosperms
- Clade: Eudicots
- Clade: Asterids
- Order: Gentianales
- Family: Gentianaceae
- Genus: Centaurium
- Species: C. pulchellum

Binomial name
- Centaurium pulchellum (Sw.) Hayek ex Hand.-Mazz., Stadlm., Janch. & Faltis

Varieties and subspecies
- Centaurium pulchellum var. altaicum (Griseb.) Cufod.; Centaurium pulchellum subsp. grandiflorum (Batt.) Maire; Centaurium pulchellum subsp. pulchellum

= Centaurium pulchellum =

Plant species in the gentian family

Centaurium pulchellum is a species of flowering plant in the gentian family known by the common name lesser centaury, or slender centaury. It differs from Centaurium erythraea by lacking basal rosette of leaves and by having a developed peduncle below the flowers. It is often much smaller, less than ten centimetres. It is native to the southern temperate parts of Europe.

== Description ==
Lesser centaury is an erect annual herb branching from the base, often less than 10 cm (4 in) tall, and much smaller than common centaury (Centaurium erythraea). Sometimes it is reduced to a single stem with one flower. By the time it flowers, from June to September, there is no basal rosette. The leafy stem has opposite pairs of narrow oval leaves. The inflorescence is a group of a few pale pink star-like flowers, each with a short stalk, a tube and five narrow petals, about 1 cm (0.4 in) across, flat-faced with yellow anthers. Like other members of the family, the flowers close in the afternoon. The calyx is about as long as the fruit, which is a cylindrical capsule.

== Distribution and habitat ==
This plant is found in the southerly temperate zones of Europe. It occurs mainly in the southern half of the British Isles, especially near the south coast of England. It grows on a range of soil types, from calcareous to mildly acidic. On the coast it can be found in open sandy and muddy turf, often in saltmarshes, sand dunes and beside estuaries. Inland it inhabits lowland dry, open grasslands, heaths, woodland glades and rides, marl pits and other unshaded, disturbed ground. In Morecambe Bay, it is at the northern end of its range on the saltmarshes, growing with Juncus gerardii, Juncus maritimus, Blysmus rufus and Eleocharis quinqueflora.
