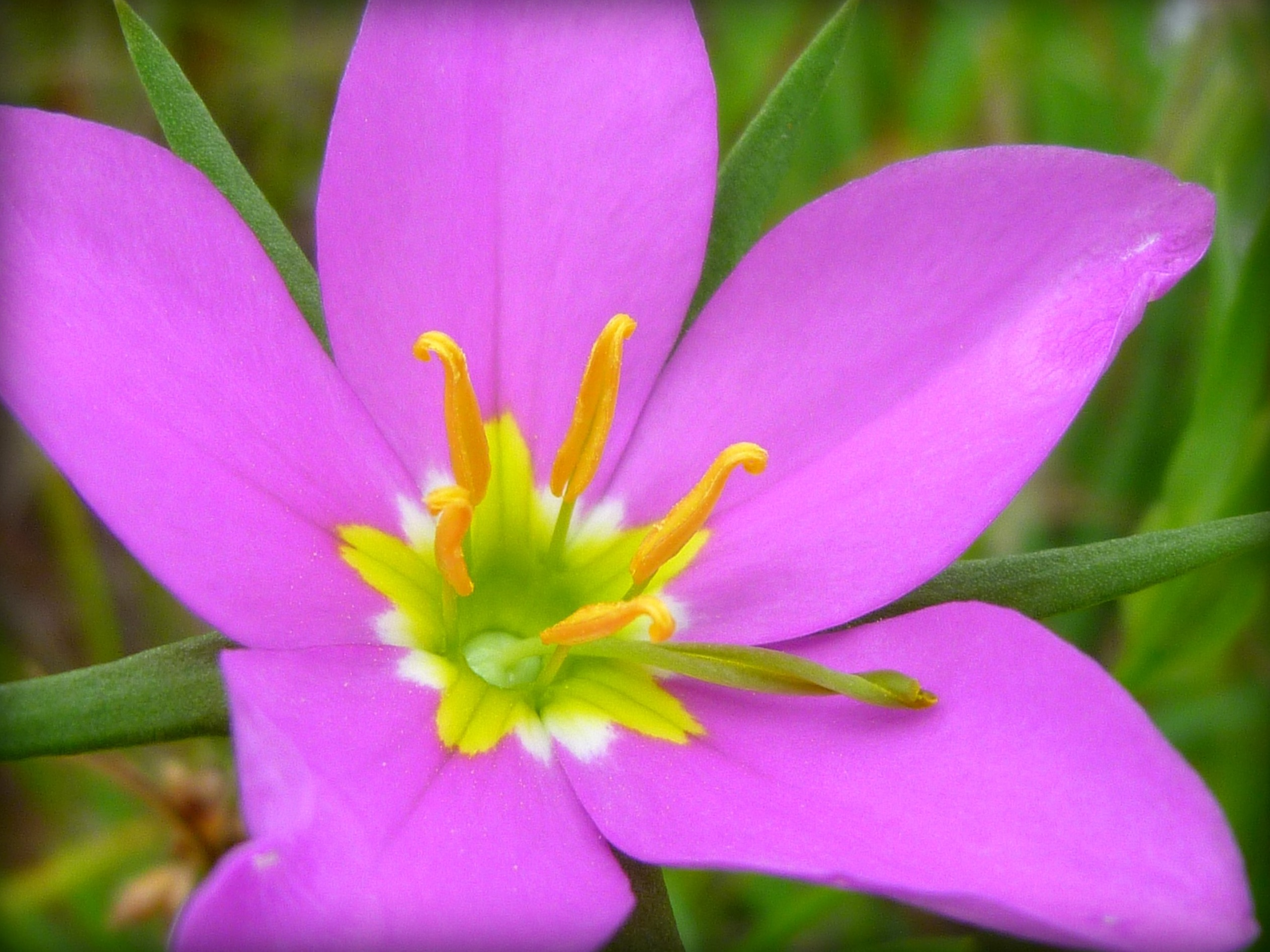
- Canchalagua (Z. venusta)

Scientific classification
- Kingdom: Plantae
- Clade: Embryophytes
- Clade: Tracheophytes
- Clade: Angiosperms
- Clade: Eudicots
- Clade: Asterids
- Order: Gentianales
- Family: Gentianaceae
- Tribe: Chironieae
- Subtribe: Chironiinae
- Genus: Zeltnera; G.Mans

Species
- about 25; see text

= Zeltnera =

Genus of flowering plants

Zeltnera is a genus of flowering plants in the gentian family. It was erected in 2004 when the genus Centaurium (the centauries) was split. Genetic analysis revealed that Centaurium was polyphyletic, made up of plants that could be grouped into four clades. Each became a genus. Centaurium remained, but it is now limited to the Eurasian species. The Mexican species now belong to genus Gyrandra, and the Mediterranean and Australian plants are in genus Schenkia. The new name Zeltnera was given to this genus, which contains most of the North American centauries. There are about 25 species.

Plants of this genus are annual, biennial, or short-lived perennial herbs. They are taprooted or have fibrous root systems. They produce one or more branching stems which are often ridged and sometimes winged. The leaves are gathered around the lower stem or arranged along the length of the stem. They vary in shape, from linear to lance-shaped to oval, and are green or yellowish. The inflorescence is variable in arrangement. The flower has a tubular throat that opens into a flat corolla with four or five lobes. It may be any shade of pink or white, and the throat is usually paler, to white or yellowish, or occasionally patterned with green. The fruit is a small capsule containing up to 700 minute seeds. Zeltnera and Centaurium species differ mostly in the morphology of the style and stigma, as well as the shape of the fruit capsule.

Zeltnera can be subdivided into three groups, a division which is supported by DNA evidence but is most obvious in terms of geography. They are casually named the "Californian group", the "Texan group", and the "Mexican group". The first group is distributed from British Columbia south through the West Coast of the United States and into Baja California. The "Texan" plants occur from Arizona to Oklahoma in the US and throughout northern Mexico. The "Mexican group" occurs in Mexico, Central America, and parts of South America. The range may extend north into Arizona.

Genus Zeltnera was named for the Swiss botanists Louis and Nicole Zeltner, who have researched Centaurium and other gentians.

Species include:

- Zeltnera abramsii
- Zeltnera arizonica – Arizona centaury
- Zeltnera beyrichii – quinineweed
- Zeltnera breviflora
- Zeltnera calycosa – Arizona centaury, shortflower centaury, rosita, Buckley centaury
- Zeltnera davyi – Davy's centaury
- Zeltnera exaltata – desert centaury
- Zeltnera fonsecae
- Zeltnera gentryi
- Zeltnera glandulifera – sticky centaury
- Zeltnera madrensis
- Zeltnera martinii
- Zeltnera maryanniana – gypsum centaury
- Zeltnera muehlenbergii – Monterey centaury
- Zeltnera multicaulis – manystem centaury
- Zeltnera namatophila – springloving centaury
- Zeltnera nesomii
- Zeltnera nevadensis
- Zeltnera nudicaulis – Santa Catalina Mountain centaury
- Zeltnera pusilla
- Zeltnera quitensis – Britton's centaury
- Zeltnera setacea
- Zeltnera stricta
- Zeltnera texensis – Lady Bird's centaury
- Zeltnera trichantha – alkali centaury
- Zeltnera venusta – charming centaury, canchalagua
- Zeltnera wigginsii
