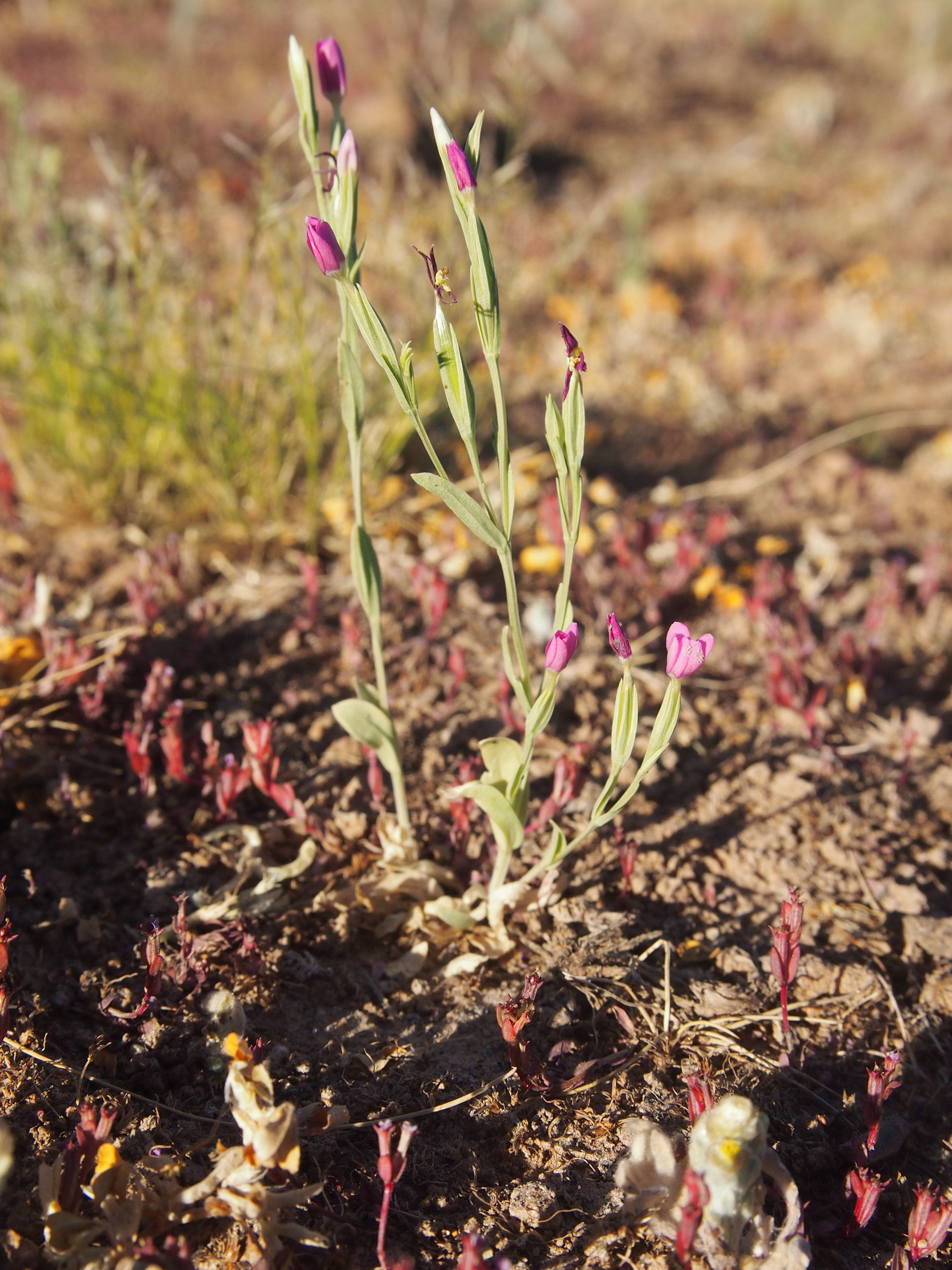

Scientific classification
- Kingdom: Plantae
- Clade: Tracheophytes
- Clade: Angiosperms
- Clade: Eudicots
- Clade: Asterids
- Order: Gentianales
- Family: Gentianaceae
- Genus: Schenkia
- Species: S. australis

Binomial name
- Schenkia australis (R.Br.) G.Mans.

= Schenkia australis =

Species of plant

Schenkia australis is a species of annual herb in the Gentianaceae family. It is endemic to Australia.

== Description ==
Schenkia australis grows as an annual, or rarely biannual, herb, from 2 to 30 centimetres high. Flowers are pink, red or yellow.

== Taxonomy ==
This species was first published by Robert Brown in his 1810 Prodromus florae Novae Hollandiae, under the name Erythraea australis. In 1917 the name it was transferred into Centaurium as C. australe by George Claridge Druce, on the grounds that Erythraea was an illegitimate later synonym of Centaurium. In 1928 Karel Domin resurrected Erythraea, transferring this species back into it, but at the same time demoting it to a variety of Erythraea spicata (now Schenkia spicata). Eventually it was restored to Centaurium for a second time.

In 1996, it was decided that Centaurium australis could not be differentiated from Centaurium spicatum (now Schenkia spicata), and the two were merged under the latter name. This was overturned, however, in 2004, based on strong evidence that Australia specimens of C. spicatum are not the same taxon as European specimens; specifically, all Australian specimens studied were tetraploid, whereas all European specimens studied with diploid. The same study also split Centaurium into four genera, with C. spicatum moving into Schenkia as S. spicata. Thus the Australian specimens were given the name Schenkia australis.

Australian herbaria have been slow to take up these nomenclatural changes. As of 2008, the Western Australian Herbarium still attributes their specimens to Centaurium spicatum, and the National Herbarium of New South Wales uses Schenkia spicata. However the most recent update to the Census of Australian Vascular Plants uses Schenkia australis, as does the Australian Plant Census.

=== Common name ===
Since Australian specimens were previously ascribed to Centaurium spicatum, they were referred to by that species' common name, Spike Centaury. It remains to be seen whether this common name will continue to be applied in Australia now that the Australian specimens have been segregated into their own species.

== Distribution and habitat ==
Endemic to Australia, it is widespread on the mainland, occurring in all mainland states. It prefers damp sandy soils.
