= Moʻomomi =

Nature Conservancy in Molokaʻi, Hawaii, USA

Coordinates: 21.195452°N 157.166344°W

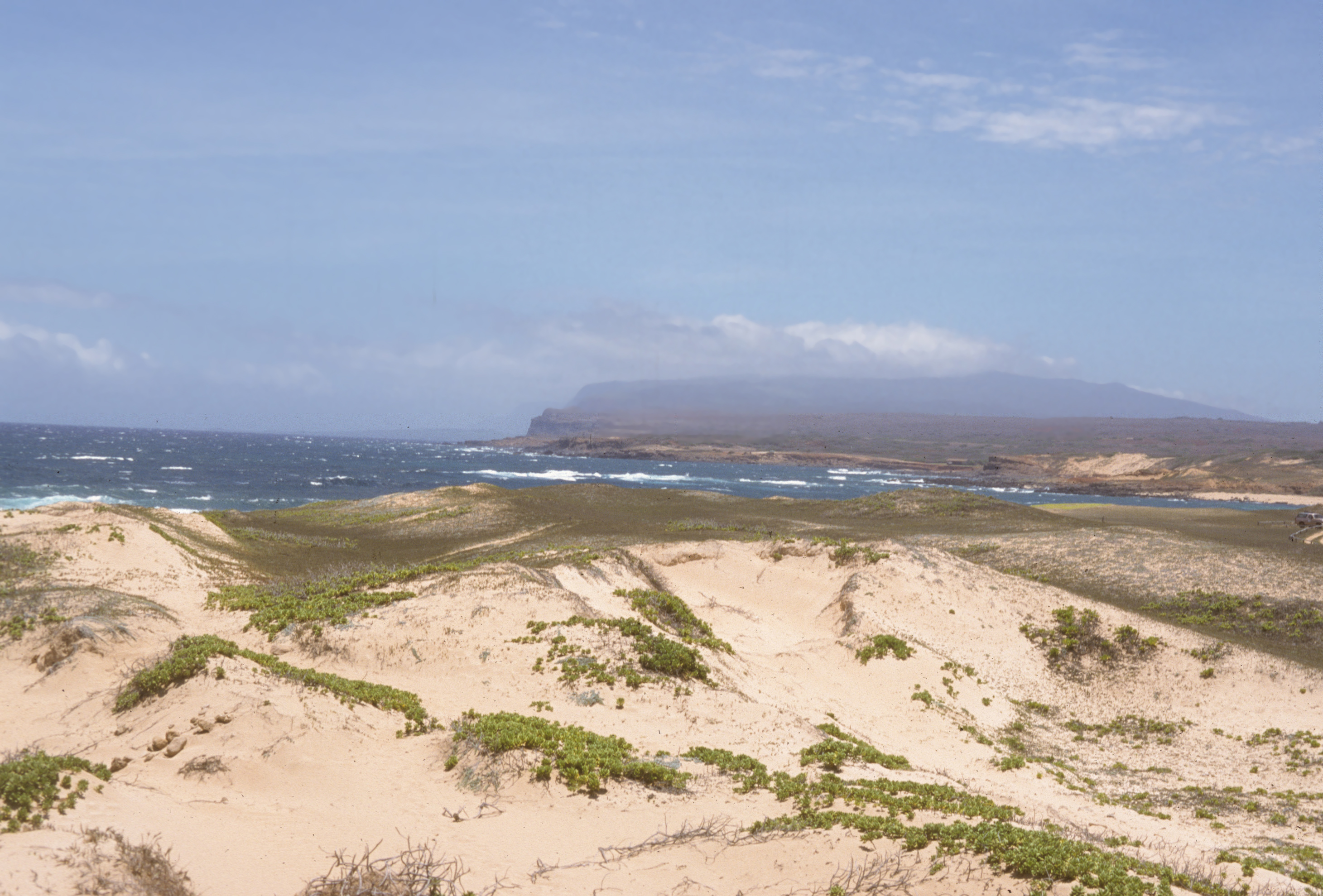
Moʻomomi dunes and view of Kamakou Peak

Moʻomomi is a Nature Conservancy preserve located on the northwestern shore of Molokaʻi in Hawaii. It was established in 1988. This area is dry and hot, primarily denuded of soil due to overgrazing and poor land use practices over the last 150 years.

Moʻomomi preserve protects some of the very last intact coastal shrublands in Hawaii. The Moʻomomi preserve contains sand dunes, lithified sand formations, rare endemic Hawaiian coastal plant species, nesting seabirds and green sea turtles (Chelonia mydas), and the occasional Hawaiian monk seal (Monachus schauinslandi). An endangered bee species, Hylaeus hilaris, is only known from here.

Within the preserve, over 22 native plant species can be found including ʻakoko (Euphorbia skottsbergii), nehe (Lipochaeta integrifolia), Tetramolopium rockii, hinahina kū kahakai (Heliotropium anomalum var. argenteum), kolokolo kahakai (Vitex rotundifolia), pōhuehue (Ipomoea pes-caprae brasiliensis), pāʻūohiʻiaka (Jacquemontia ovalifolia sandwicensis), naupaka (Scaevola spp.), ʻenaʻena (Pseudognaphalium sandwicensium var. molokaiense), and many others. Access to Moʻomoni Preserve is available during Nature Conservancy guided tours.
