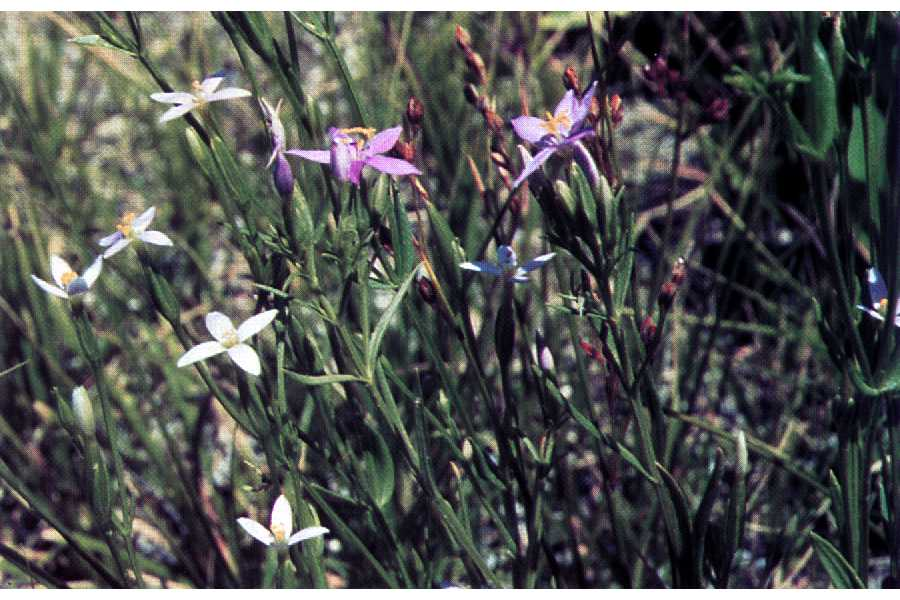

Conservation status
- Secure (NatureServe)

Scientific classification
- Kingdom: Plantae
- Clade: Tracheophytes
- Clade: Angiosperms
- Clade: Eudicots
- Clade: Asterids
- Order: Gentianales
- Family: Gentianaceae
- Genus: Zeltnera
- Species: Z. exaltata

Binomial name
- Zeltnera exaltata (Griseb.) G.Mans., 2004

Synonyms
- Centaurium exaltatum (Griseb.) W.Wight ex Piper (1906); Cicendia exaltata Griseb. (1838); Erythraea exaltata (Griseb.) Coville (1893)

= Zeltnera exaltata =

Plant species in the family

Zeltnera exaltata is a species of flowering plant in the gentian family known by the common names desert centaury and tall centaury. It is native to much of western North America from British Columbia to Arizona to Nebraska, where it grows in moist areas, generally with alkaline soils. This is an annual herb which is variable in appearance, especially in different habitat types. It grows up to about 35 centimeters in height, its slender stem with widely spaced pairs of oppositely arranged, pointed leaves 1 to 3 centimeters long. The inflorescence is an open array of flowers, each on a pedicel which may be several centimeters in length. The flower has generally four or five white or pink lobes, each somewhat rolled to appear narrow in shape.

== Taxonomy ==
Zeltnera exaltata was scientifically described by August Grisebach in 1838 with the name Cicendia exaltata. The botanist Charles Vancouver Piper, working from information provided by William Franklin Wight, published a paper in 1906 moving it to the Centaurium genus, where it was accepted for almost a century. In 2004 Guilhem Mansion published a paper where it was reevaluated and renamed as Zeltnera exaltata.
