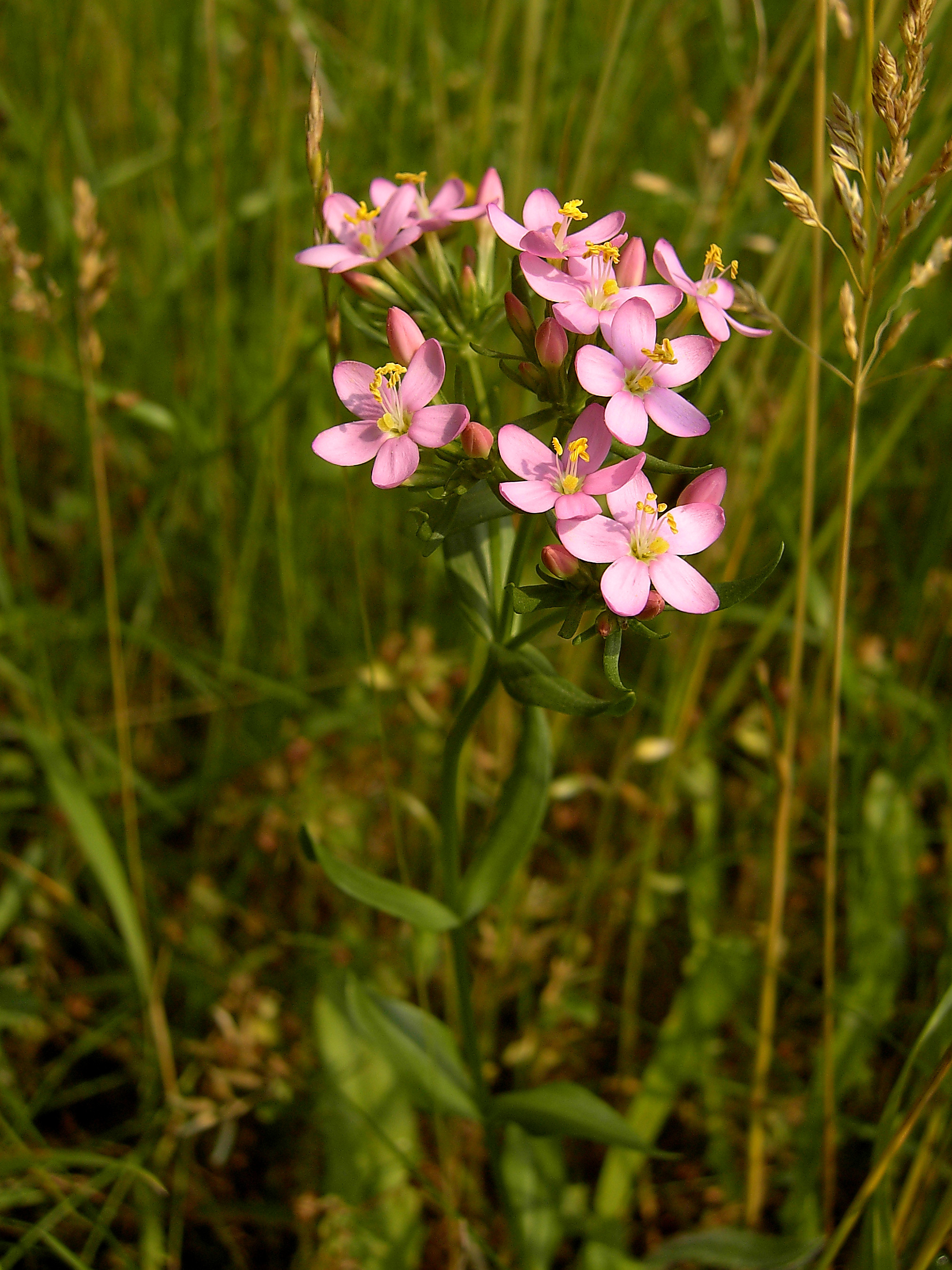
- Centaurium erythraea

Scientific classification
- Kingdom: Plantae
- Clade: Embryophytes
- Clade: Tracheophytes
- Clade: Angiosperms
- Clade: Eudicots
- Clade: Asterids
- Order: Gentianales
- Family: Gentianaceae
- Tribe: Chironieae
- Subtribe: Chironiinae
- Genus: Centaurium; Hill, 1756

Synonyms
- Centaurella Delarbre (1800); Erythraea Reneaulme ex Borkh. (1796); Gonipia Raf. (1837); Hippocentaurea Schult. (1814); Libadion Bubani (1897); Monodiella Maire (1943); Xanthaea Rchb. (1841)

= Centaurium =

Genus of flowering plants in the gentian family

Centaurium (centaury) is a genus of 20 species in the gentian family (Gentianaceae), tribe Chironieae, subtribe Chironiinae. The genus was named after the centaur Chiron, famed in Greek mythology for his skill in medicinal herbs. It is distributed across Europe and Asia.

Until 2004, Centaurium was given a much wider circumscription, comprising about 50 species ranging across Europe, Asia, the Americas, Australasia, and the Pacific. However this circumscription was polyphyletic, so in 2004 the genus was split into four, being Centaurium sensu stricto, Zeltnera, Gyrandra, and Schenkia.

== Species ==
According to Plants of the World Online there are 24 species of Centaurium.

- Centaurium ameghinoi (Speg.) Druce
- Centaurium barrelieroides Pau
- Centaurium bianoris (Sennen) Sennen
- Centaurium cachanlahuen (Molina) B.L.Rob.
- Centaurium capense C.R.Broome
- Centaurium centaurioides (Roxb.) S.R.Rao & Hemadri
- Centaurium chloodes (Brot.) Samp.
- Centaurium cochinchinense (Spreng.) Druce
- Centaurium compar (R.Br.) Druce
- Centaurium erythraea Rafn
- Centaurium favargeri Zeltner
- Centaurium flexuosum (Maire) J.-P.Lebrun & Marais
- Centaurium littorale (Turner) Gilmour
- Centaurium mairei Zeltner
- Centaurium malzacianum Maire
- Centaurium maritimum (L.) Fritsch
- Centaurium minutissimum Maire
- Centaurium portense (Brot.) Butcher
- Centaurium pulchellum (Sw.) Hayek ex Hand.-Mazz., Stadlm., Janch. & Faltis
- Centaurium quadrifolium (L.) G.López & C.E.Jarvis
- Centaurium rigualii Esteve
- Centaurium scilloides (L.f.) Samp.
- Centaurium serpentinicola Carlström
- Centaurium tenuiflorum (Hoffmanns. & Link) Fritsch

== See also ==
- Schenkia spicata – formerly C. spicatum
- Zeltnera calycosa – formerly C. calycosum
- Zeltnera davyi – formerly C. davyi
- Zeltnera exaltata – formerly C. exaltatum
- Zeltnera muehlenbergii – formerly C. muehlenbergii
- Zeltnera namatophila – formerly C. namatophilum
- Zeltnera venusta – formerly C. venustum
