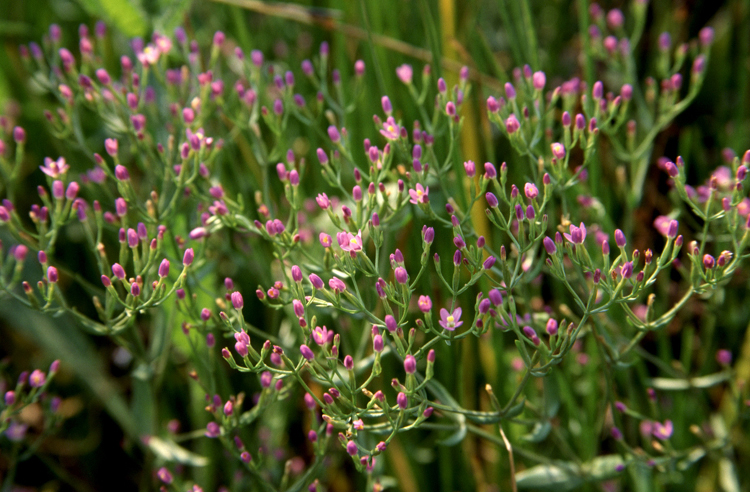

Scientific classification
- Kingdom: Plantae
- Clade: Tracheophytes
- Clade: Angiosperms
- Clade: Eudicots
- Clade: Asterids
- Order: Gentianales
- Family: Gentianaceae
- Genus: Zeltnera
- Species: Z. muehlenbergii

Binomial name
- Zeltnera muehlenbergii (Griseb.) G.Mans.

Synonyms
- Centaurium curvistamineum (Wittr.) Druce; Centaurium floribundum (Benth.) B.L.Rob.; Centaurium minimum (Howell) Piper; Centaurium muehlenbergii (Griseb.) W.Wight ex Piper; Centaurodes floribundum (Benth.) Kuntze; Centaurodes muehlenbergii (Griseb.) Kuntze; Chironia dubia Willd. ex Griseb.; Erythraea curvistamineum Wittr.; Erythraea curvistaninea Wittr.; Erythraea floribunda Benth.; Erythraea minima Howell; Erythraea muehlenbergii Griseb.; Erythraea pulchella A.Gray ex Griseb. [nom. illeg.]

= Zeltnera muehlenbergii =

Species of plant

Zeltnera muehlenbergii is a species of annual herb commonly known as Monterey centaury and Muhlenberg's centaury. It is native to western North America from British Columbia to California and Nevada, where it commonly grows in forests and other moist places. This is an annual herb growing thin, erect, branching stems to heights anywhere between 10 centimeters and one meter. Oval-shaped leaves are arranged oppositely on the stem and are up to 2 or 3 centimeters long. The branching inflorescence bears many flowers, each with small bracts at its base. The flower has five oval-shaped petallike lobes each a few millimeters long.

Until 2004 it was placed in genus Centaurium.
