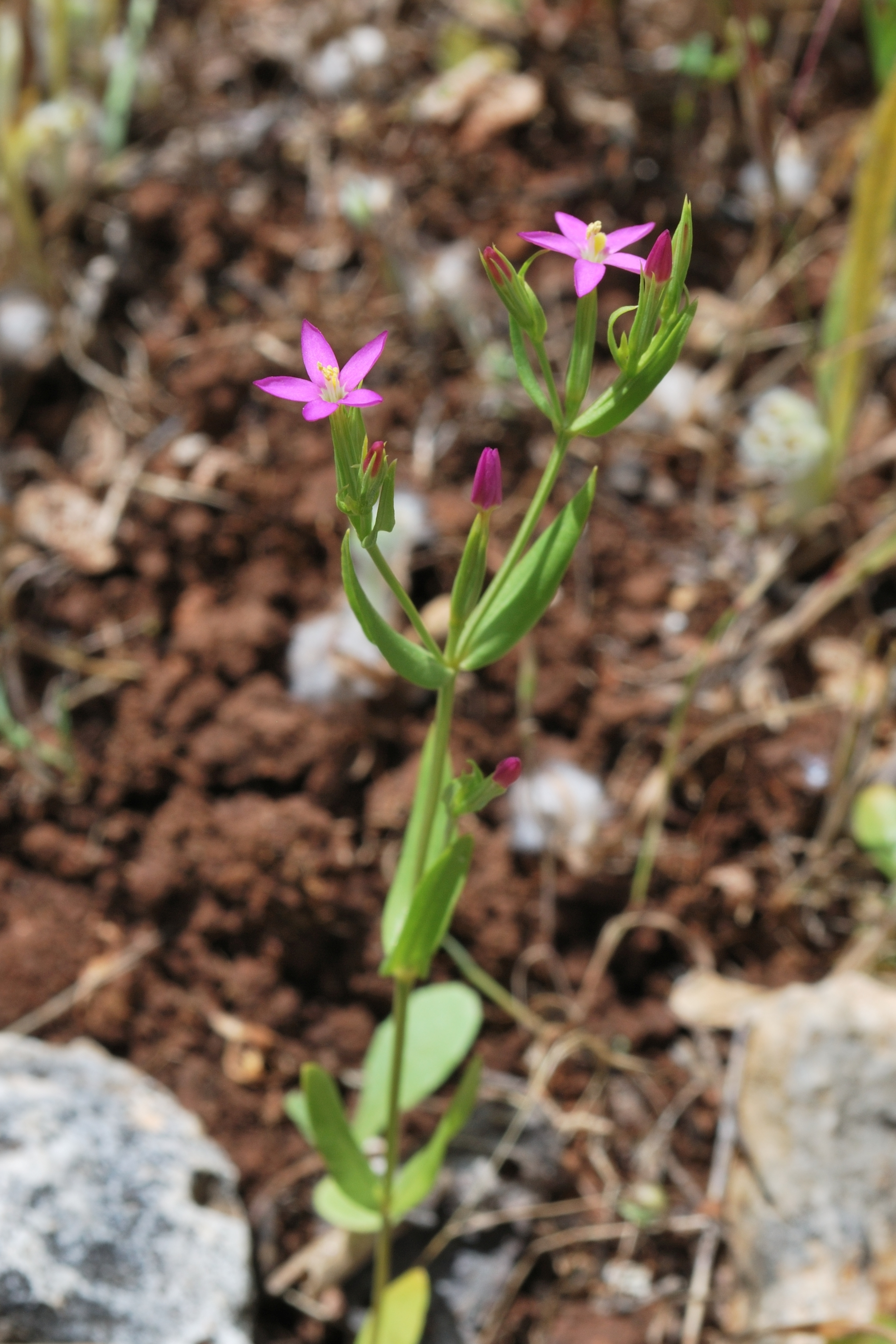

Scientific classification
- Kingdom: Plantae
- Clade: Tracheophytes
- Clade: Angiosperms
- Clade: Eudicots
- Clade: Asterids
- Order: Gentianales
- Family: Gentianaceae
- Genus: Centaurium
- Species: C. tenuiflorum

Binomial name
- Centaurium tenuiflorum (Hoffmanns. & Link) Fritsch

Synonyms
- Centaurium pulchellum subsp. tenuiflorum (Hoffmanns. & Link) Maire; Centaurium pulchellum var. tenuiflorum (Hoffmanns. & Link) Samp.; Erythraea latifolia var. tenuiflora (Hoffmanns. & Link) Willk.; Erythraea pulchella subsp. tenuiflora (Hoffmanns. & Link) Arcang.; Erythraea ramosissima var. tenuiflora (Hoffmanns. & Link) Cout.; Erythraea tenuiflora Hoffmanns. & Link

= Centaurium tenuiflorum =

Species of plant

Centaurium tenuiflorum, the slender centaury, is a species of annual herb in the family Gentianaceae. They have a self-supporting growth form and simple, broad leaves. Individuals can grow to 17 cm tall. It is native to the Mediterranean basin, Western Asia to the Transcaucasus, Iran, and western Himalayas, Macaronesia, Great Britain, the Crimean Peninsula, Chad, and Socotra.

The species was first described as Erythraea tenuiflora by Johann Centurius Hoffmannsegg and Johann Heinrich Friedrich Link in 1813. In 1907 Karl Fritsch reassigned it to genus Centaurium as Centaurium tenuiflorum.

== Subspecies ==
Four subspecies are accepted.

- Centaurium tenuiflorum subsp. acutiflorum (Schott) Zeltner – Mediterranean basin to Crimea, Iran, Transcaucasus, and western Himalayas
- Centaurium tenuiflorum subsp. anglicum T.C.G.Rich & McVeigh – southern Great Britain
- Centaurium tenuiflorum subsp. tenuiflorum – Mediterranean basin, Chad, Azores, Canary Islands, Madeira, and Socotra
- Centaurium tenuiflorum subsp. viridense (Bolle) O.Erikss., A.Hansen & Sunding – Cape Verde Islands

== Sources ==
This article incorporates text from a free content work. Licensed under CC0 (license statement/permission). Text taken from Centaurium tenuiflorum. Encyclopedia of Life.
