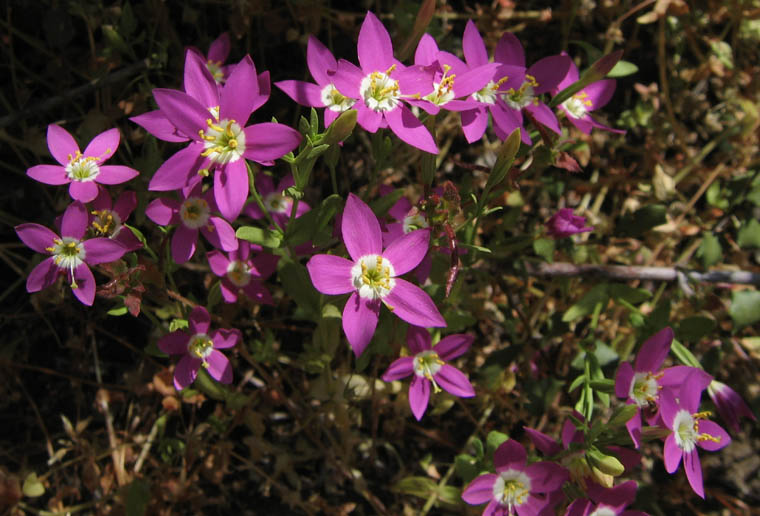

Conservation status
- Vulnerable (NatureServe)

Scientific classification
- Kingdom: Plantae
- Clade: Tracheophytes
- Clade: Angiosperms
- Clade: Eudicots
- Clade: Asterids
- Order: Gentianales
- Family: Gentianaceae
- Genus: Zeltnera
- Species: Z. venusta

Binomial name
- Zeltnera venusta (Gray) G.Mans.

= Zeltnera venusta =

Species of plant

Zeltnera venusta is a species of flowering plant in the gentian family known by the common names California centaury, charming centaury and canchalagua. This centaury is native to much of California, southern Oregon, and northwest Baja California.

It grows in many habitats up to elevations around 1300 meters. It is an annual wildflower rarely reaching half a meter in height. The pointed oval leaves grow opposite on the thin stems. The inflorescence is tipped with one or more showy star-shaped flowers, each with a white-centered magenta corolla about 2 centimeters wide.

Until 2004, it was placed in genus Centaurium as Centaurium venustum.
