= Heinrich Karl Beyrich =

German botanist

Heinrich Karl Beyrich (22 March 1796 – 15 September 1834) was a German botanist born in Wernigerode.

He studied botany at the University of Göttingen, and in 1819 performed botanical excursions throughout northern Italy and the eastern Alps. In 1822–23, he went on an expedition to Brazil on behalf of the Prussian government in order to collect flora for Pfaueninsel and the Neu-Schönberger Botanical Garden. In September 1834, while on an expedition through North America, he became ill and died at Fort Gibson, located in the present-day state of Oklahoma.

He has numerous plant species named after him, including Centaurium beyrichii, also known as the "mountain pink", and Galeandra beyrichii (Beyrich's helmet orchid).
