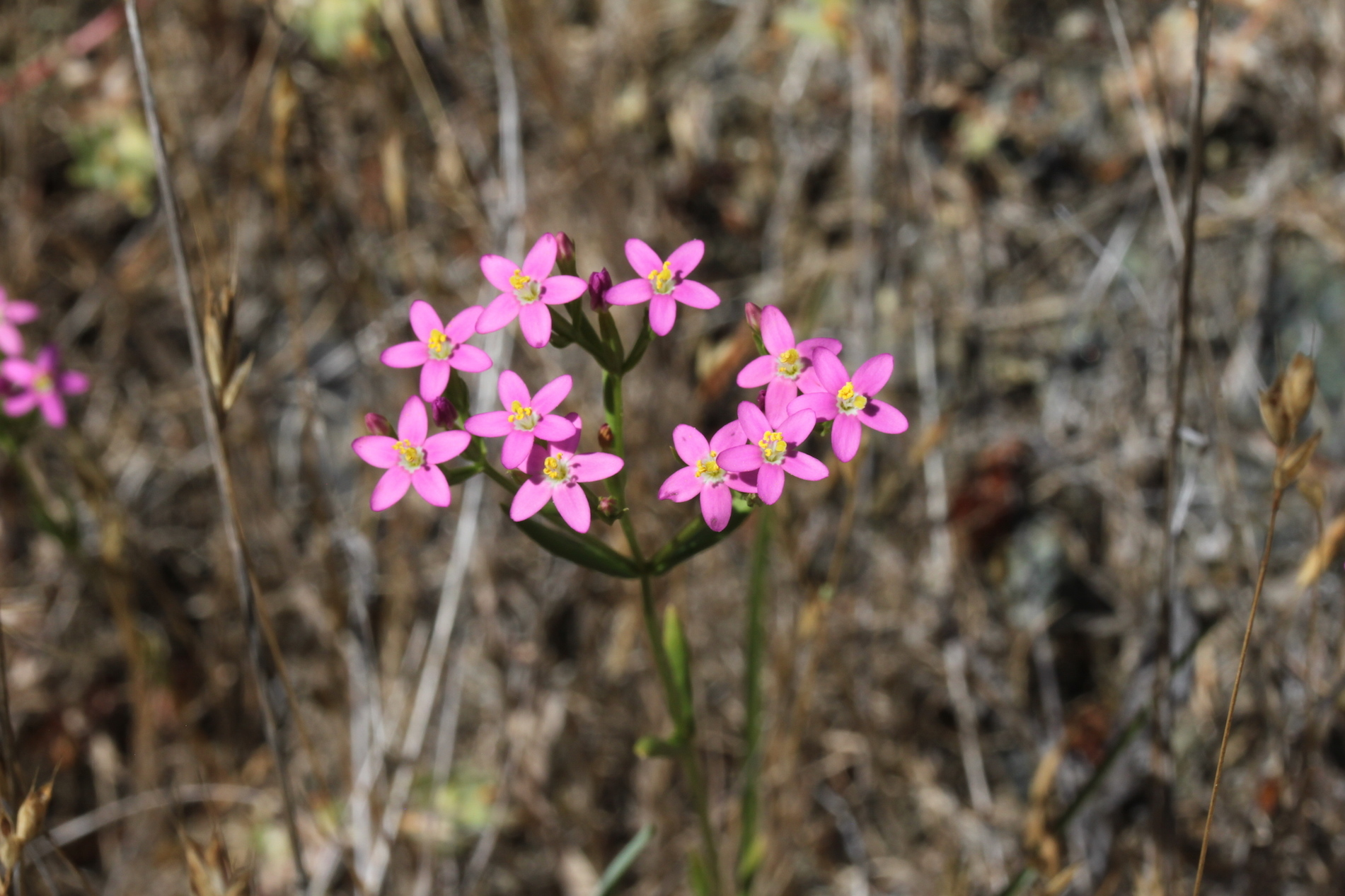

Scientific classification
- Kingdom: Plantae
- Clade: Tracheophytes
- Clade: Angiosperms
- Clade: Eudicots
- Clade: Asterids
- Order: Gentianales
- Family: Gentianaceae
- Genus: Zeltnera
- Species: Z. trichantha

Binomial name
- Zeltnera trichantha (Griseb.) G.Mans.

Synonyms
- Centaurium trichanthum (Griseb.) B.L.Rob.; Erythraea trichantha Griseb.; Erythraea trichantha var. angustifolia Griseb.

= Zeltnera trichantha =

Species of flowering plant

Zeltnera trichantha is a species of flowering plant in the family Gentianaceae. It is referred to by the common name alkali centaury. It is endemic to northern California.

== Description ==
Zeltnera trichantha plants are up to 45 centimetres (18 in) tall with ovate to lanceolate leaves up to 4 centimetres (1.6 in) long. The inflorescence is flat topped and densely packed with small but showy pink flowers with five petals and a yellow to white throat.

== Range and habitat ==
Zeltnera trichantha is native to northern California, mostly in coastal hills and mountains and occasionally in the foothills of the Sierra Nevada. It often grows in alkaline vernal pools and saline flats, sometimes on serpentine soils.
