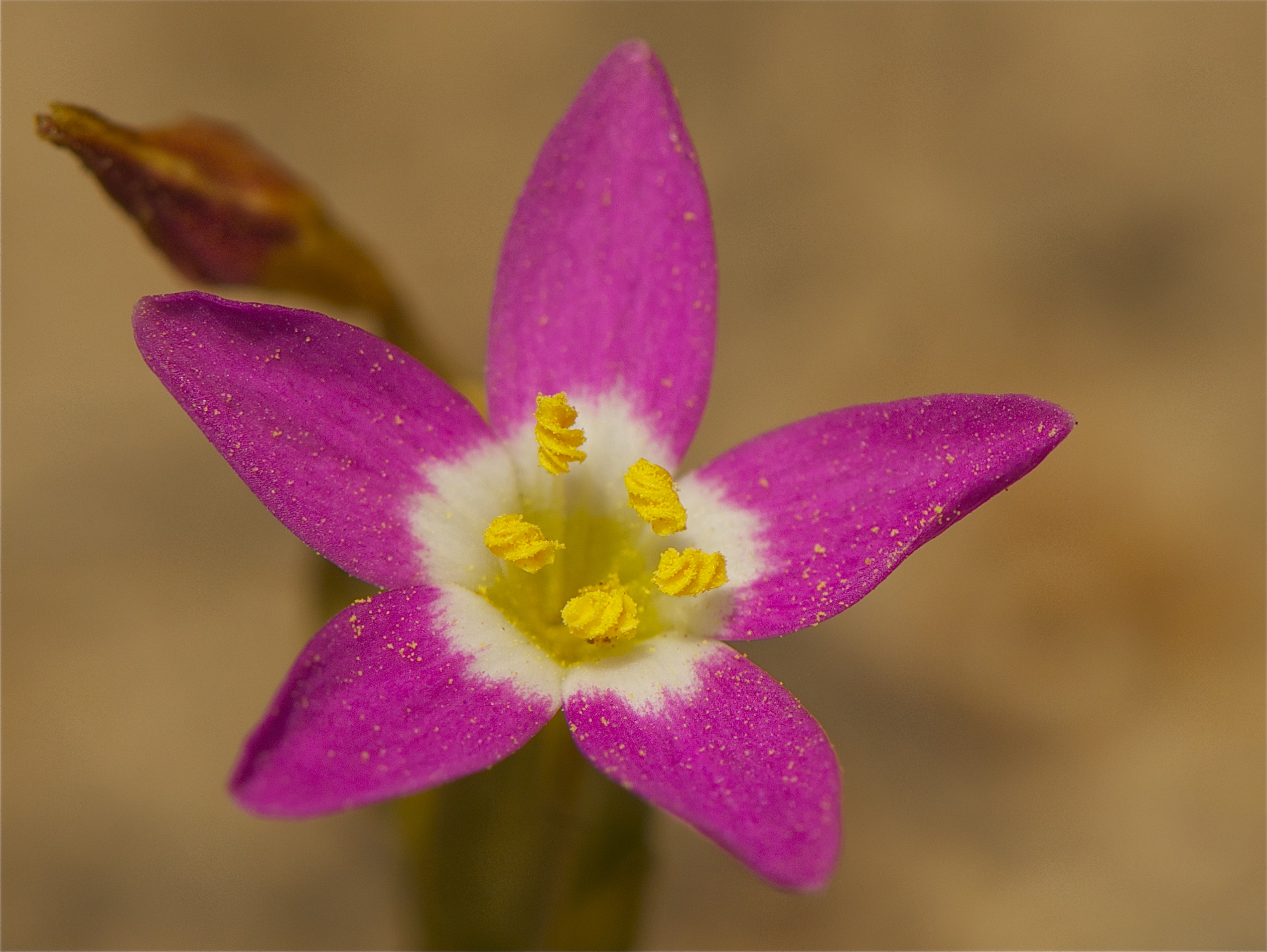

Conservation status
- Vulnerable (NatureServe)

Scientific classification
- Kingdom: Plantae
- Clade: Tracheophytes
- Clade: Angiosperms
- Clade: Eudicots
- Clade: Asterids
- Order: Gentianales
- Family: Gentianaceae
- Genus: Zeltnera
- Species: Z. davyi

Binomial name
- Zeltnera davyi (Jeps.) G.Mans., 2004

Synonyms
- Centaurium davyi (Jeps.) Abrams (1951); Centaurium exaltatum var. davyi Jeps. (1925)

= Zeltnera davyi =

Plant species in the gentian family

Zeltnera davyi is a species of flowering plant in the gentian family known by the common name Davy's centaury.

== Distribution ==
The plant is nearly endemic to California, where it is known from the coastline around the San Francisco Bay Area and areas north, as well as from Santa Cruz Island, one of the Channel Islands. It is also found in the northern Mexican state of Baja California to some extent.

It grows in moist coastal sage scrub habitats on bluffs and dunes, and in coastal woodlands.

== Description ==
Zeltnera davyi is an annual herb not exceeding about 25 centimeters in height, with oval leaves under 2 centimeters long.

The inflorescence is a small, open array of flowers, some on very short pedicels. Each flower has generally five overlapping corolla lobes, each only a few millimeters in length, usually pink or partially pink in color.

== Taxonomy ==
Zeltnera davyi was scientifically described as a subspecies named Centaurium exaltatum var. davyi by Willis Linn Jepson in 1925. It was reevaluated as a species by LeRoy Abrams in 1951 and given its present name by Guilhem Mansion in 2004.
