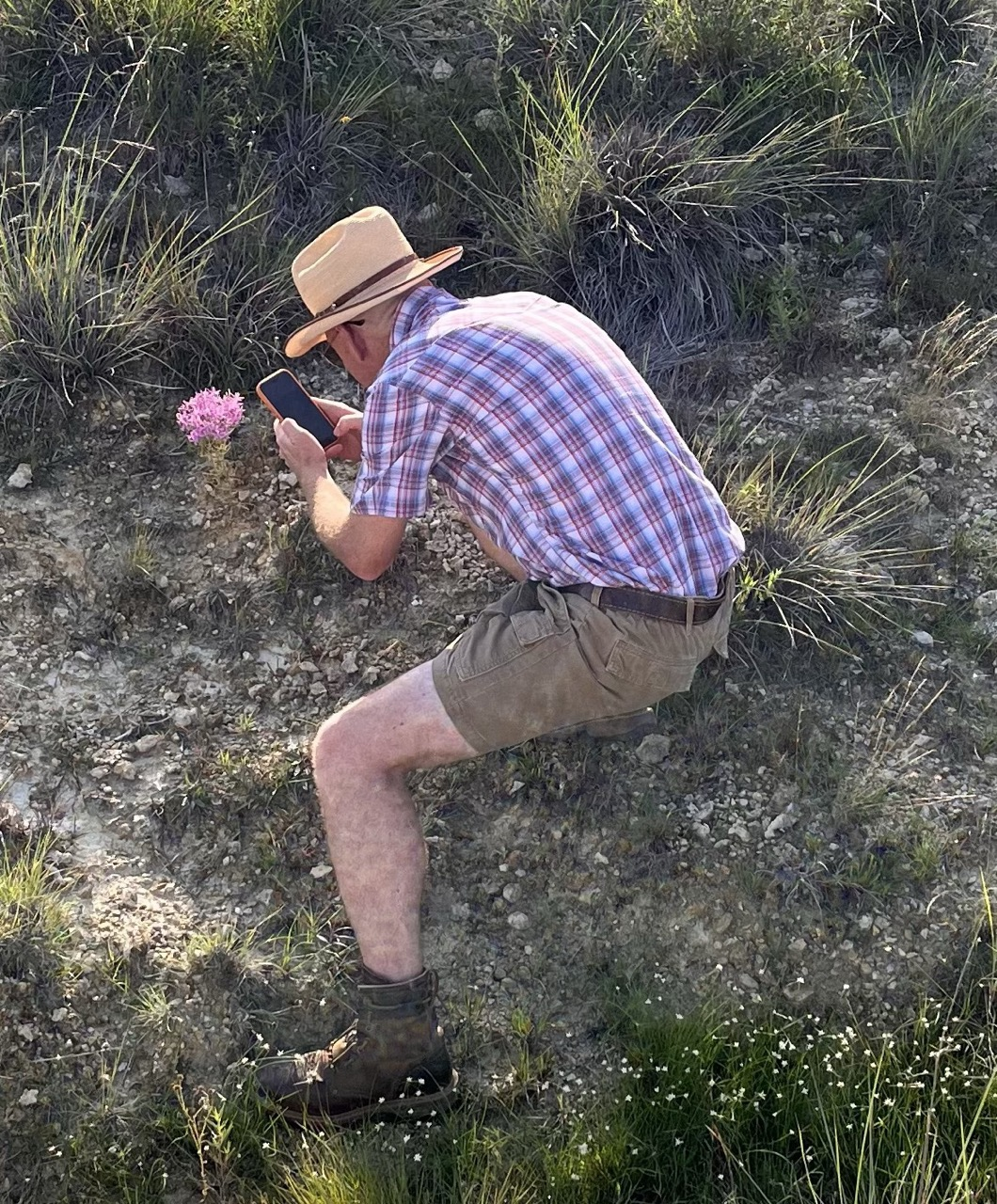

Scientific classification
- Kingdom: Plantae
- Clade: Embryophytes
- Clade: Tracheophytes
- Clade: Spermatophytes
- Clade: Angiosperms
- Clade: Eudicots
- Clade: Asterids
- Order: Gentianales
- Family: Gentianaceae
- Genus: Zeltnera
- Species: Z. beyrichii

Binomial name
- Zeltnera beyrichii (Torr. & A.Gray) G.Mans.

= Zeltnera beyrichii =

Species of plant

Zeltnera beyrichii, commonly known as mountain pink, quinine weed or rock centaury, is an annual plant in the New World that blooms from late spring to early fall. Used as a medicinal plant by pioneers, the flowers were dried and used to reduce fevers.

Until 2004 it was known as Centaurium beyrichii.
