= Hawaiian tropical low shrublands =

Tropical savanna ecoregion of the Hawaiian Islands in the United States

Coordinates: 24°N 165°W

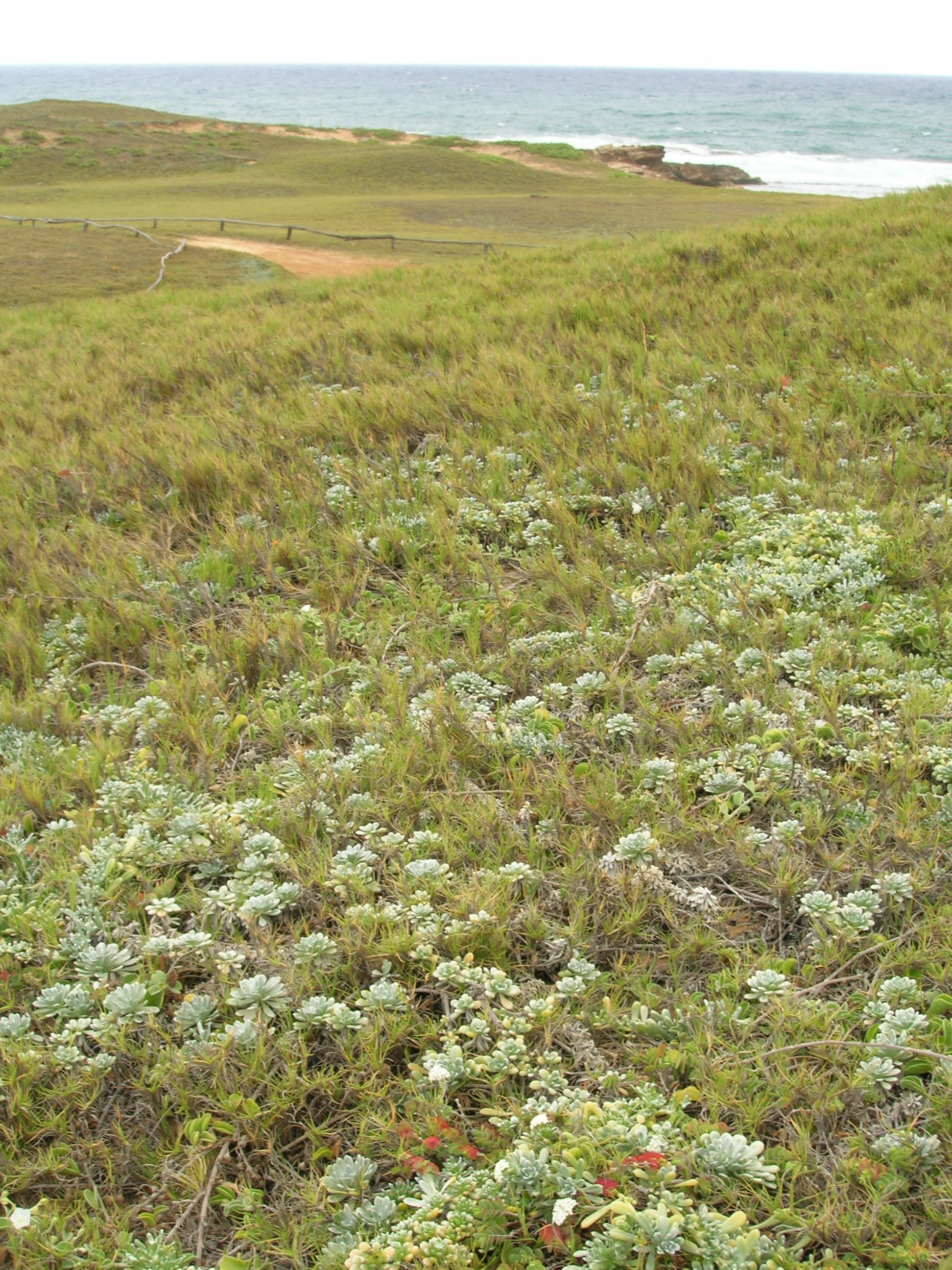
- The Nature Conservancy's Moʻomomi Preserve, Molokaʻi.

Ecology
- Realm: Oceanian
- Biome: Tropical and subtropical grasslands, savannas, and shrublands
- Borders: Hawaiian tropical dry forests

Geography
- Area: 1,500 km^{2} (580 mi^{2})
- Country: United States
- State: Hawaii
- Climate type: Tropical savanna (Aw)

Conservation
- Conservation status: Critical/Endangered
- Global 200: No
- Protected: 0 km² (0%)

The Hawaiian tropical low shrublands are a tropical savanna ecoregion in the Hawaiian Islands.

== Geography ==
These shrublands cover an area of 1,500 km^{2} (580 sq mi) in the leeward lowlands of the main islands and most of the smaller islands, not including the Northwestern Hawaiian Islands which form an ecoregion of their own.

== Flora ==
The ecoregion includes both grasslands and mixed shrublands. Kāwelu (Eragrostis variabilis), mauʻu ʻakiʻaki (Fimbristylis cymosa), ʻakiʻaki (Sporobolus virginicus), and Lepturus repens are common grassland plants. Shrublands are dominated by ʻilima (Sida fallax), ʻaʻaliʻi (Dodonaea viscosa), naupaka (Scaevola spp.), hinahina kū kahakai (Heliotropium anomalum var. argenteum), kīpūkai (Heliotropium curassavicum), maʻo (Gossypium tomentosum), ʻakoko (Euphorbia spp.), ʻāheahea (Chenopodium oahuense), naio (Myoporum sandwicense), kolokolo kahakai (Vitex rotundifolia), and pūkiawe (Styphelia tameiameiae). More than 90% of the plant species found in this ecoregion are endemic, including ʻōhai (Sesbania tomentosa), ʻāwiwi (Schenkia sebaeoides), and wahine noho kula (Isodendrion pyrifolium).

== Protected areas ==
Protected areas that cover part of the ecoregion include Koko Head District Park, Diamond Head, Mākua Kea'au Forest Reserve, Ka'ena Point State Park, and Kuaokala Forest Reserve on Oahu.

== See also ==
- Flora of Hawaii
- Hawaiian tropical high shrublands
- List of ecoregions in the United States (WWF)
- Oceanian realm
- Tropical and subtropical grasslands, savannas, and shrublands ecoregions
