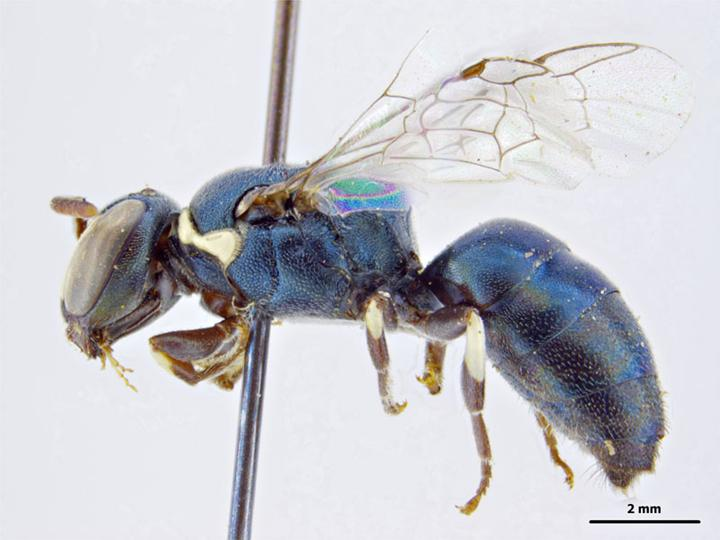
- Female

Scientific classification
- Kingdom: Animalia
- Phylum: Arthropoda
- Clade: Pancrustacea
- Class: Insecta
- Order: Hymenoptera
- Family: Colletidae
- Genus: Hylaeus
- Species: H. albonitens

Binomial name
- Hylaeus albonitens (Cockerell, 1905)

Synonyms
- Prosopis albonitens Cockerell, 1905; Prosopis albipes Friese, 1924

= Hylaeus albonitens =

Species of bee

Hylaeus albonitens, or Hylaeus (Gnathoprosopis) albonitens, is a species of bee in the family Colletidae and subfamily Hylaeinae. It is endemic to Australia. It was described by British-American entomologist Theodore Dru Alison Cockerell in 1905.

== Distribution and habitat ==
The species occurs across northern Australia. The type locality is Mackay, Queensland.

== Behaviour ==
The adults are flying mellivores. Flowering plants visited by the bees include Callistemon, Dendrobium, Eucalyptus, Eugenia, Leptospermum, Melaleuca, Owenia, Tristaniopsis and Xanthorrhoea species.

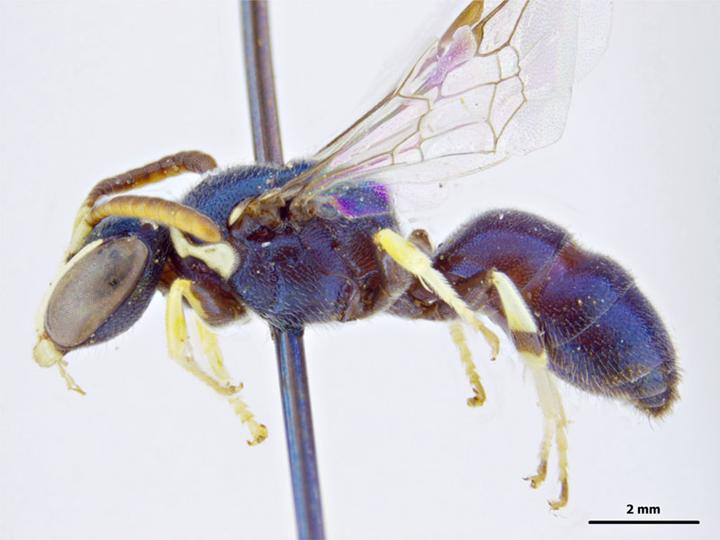
Male
