= Hylaeus hilaris =

Conservation status
- Endangered (ESA)

Scientific classification
- Kingdom: Animalia
- Phylum: Arthropoda
- Clade: Pancrustacea
- Class: Insecta
- Order: Hymenoptera
- Family: Colletidae
- Genus: Hylaeus
- Species: H. hilaris

Binomial name
- Hylaeus hilaris (Smith, 1879)

Synonyms
- Prosopis hilaris Smith, 1879; Nesoprosopis hilaris

Species of bee

Hylaeus hilaris is a species of bee, also known by the common name hilaris yellow-faced bee. It is endemic to Hawaii and known only from a single population. In September 2016, along with six other Hawaiian Hylaeus species, H. hilaris was listed for protection under the United States Endangered Species Act. This marked a first listing for any bee species in the US.

== Description ==
Hylaeus hilaris is large relative to other coastal Hawaiian Hylaeus species. Males have an almost completely yellow face with other yellow markings on the body and wings of smoky coloring. Their metasoma is red. Females have some brown markings.

== Distribution and habitat ==
Hylaeus hilaris is now known only from a single population (of unknown size) in the coastal shrublands of the Moʻomomi Preserve on Molokai. Threats to the species include habitat degradation by nonnative animals and plants, predation by nonnative insects, fires and climate change.
