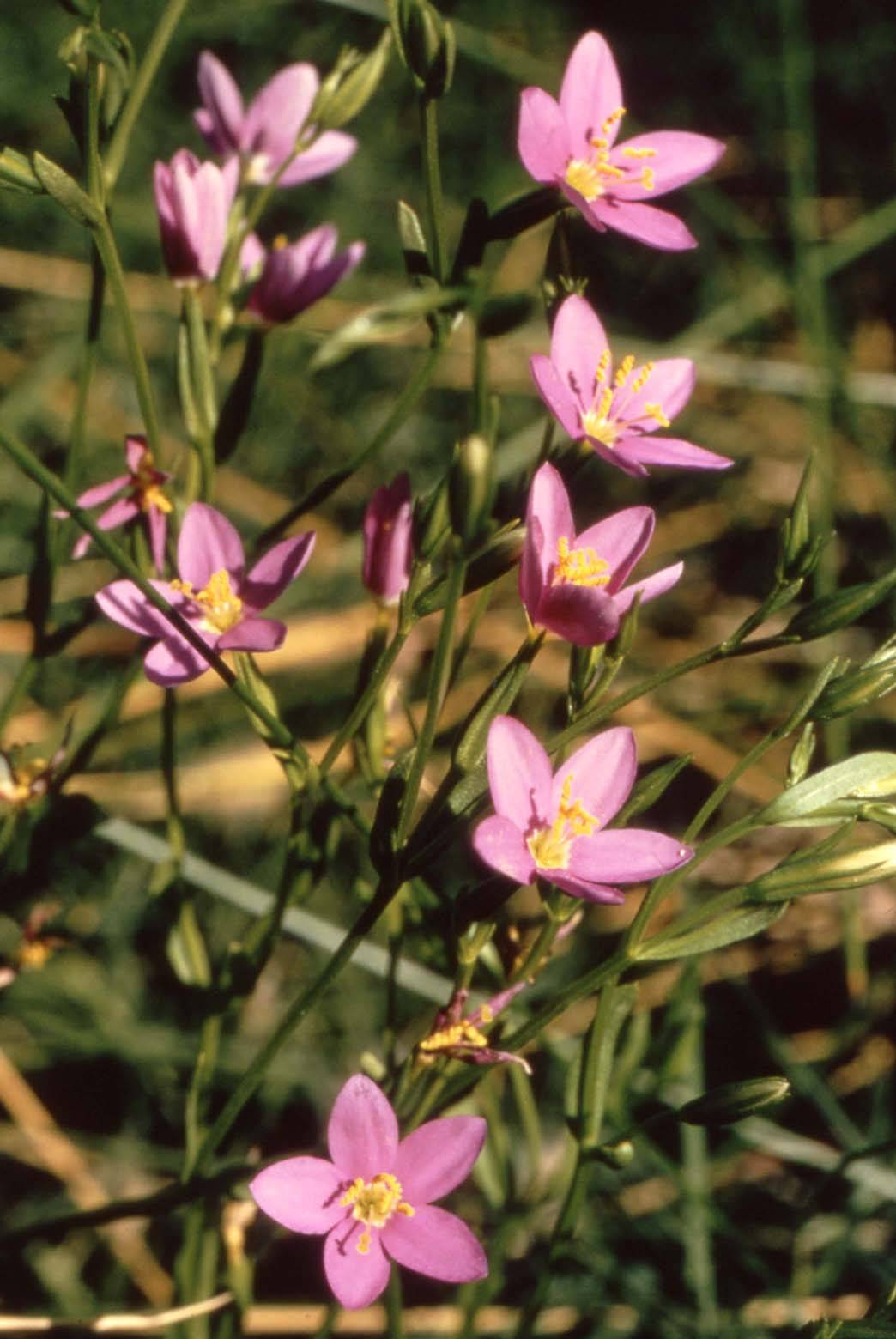

Scientific classification
- Kingdom: Plantae
- Clade: Tracheophytes
- Clade: Angiosperms
- Clade: Eudicots
- Clade: Asterids
- Order: Gentianales
- Family: Gentianaceae
- Genus: Zeltnera
- Species: Z. calycosa

Binomial name
- Zeltnera calycosa (Buckley) G.Mans.

Synonyms
- Centaurium calycosum (Buckley) Fernald (1908); Erythraea calycosa Buckley (1862)

= Zeltnera calycosa =

Plant species in the gentian family

Zeltnera calycosa is a species of flowering plant in the gentian family known by the common name Arizona centaury. It is native to northern Mexico and the southwestern United States, where it grows in moist places in otherwise dry habitat, such as riverbanks. This is an erect biennial herb growing up to half a meter tall. The widely lance-shaped leaves appear in a basal rosette and along the slender stem, each up to 7 centimeters long. The inflorescence is an open array of flowers on short pedicels. Each flower opens into five pointed lobes, each about a centimeter long and dark rose pink in color.
