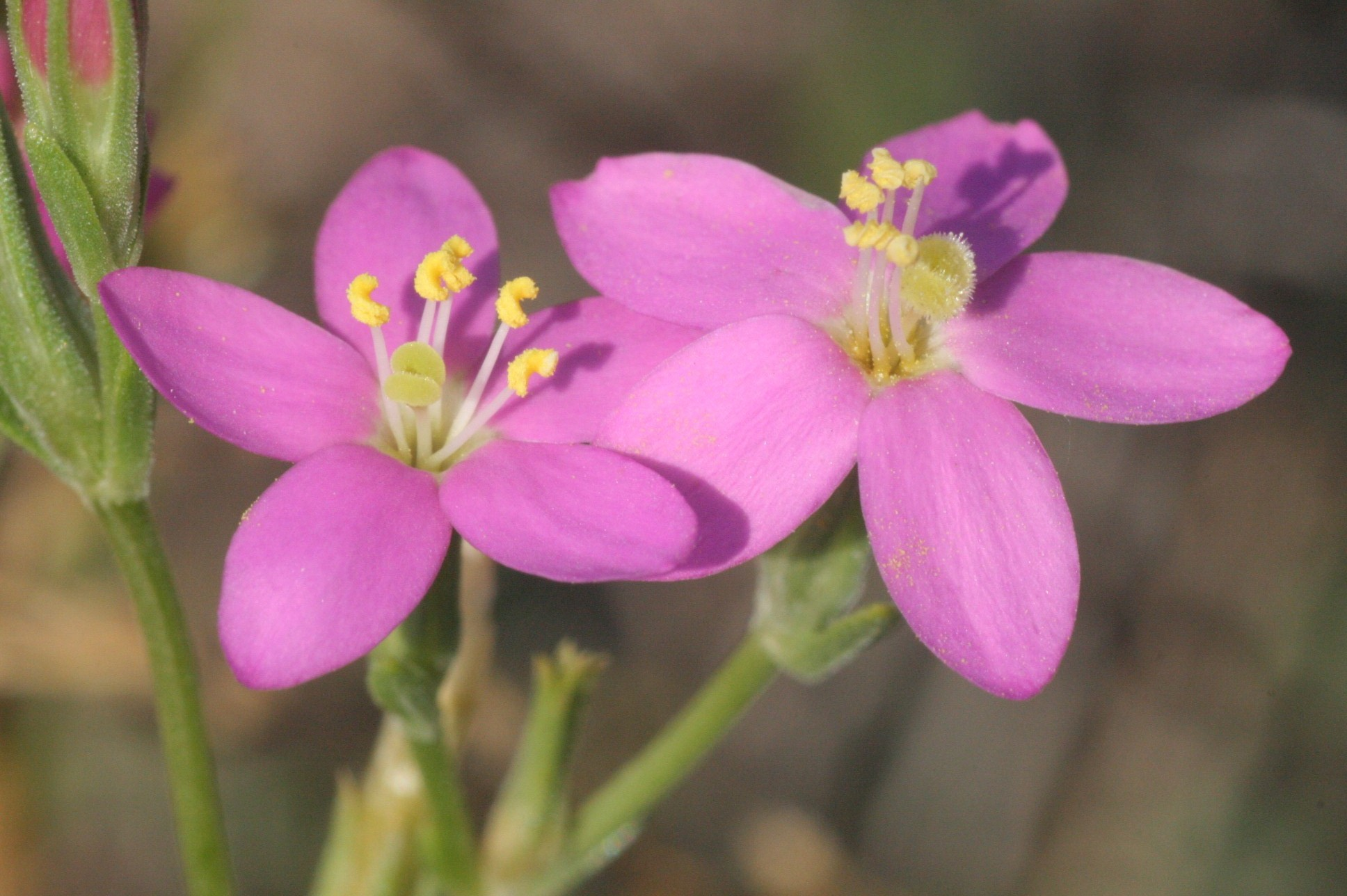

Scientific classification
- Kingdom: Plantae
- Clade: Tracheophytes
- Clade: Angiosperms
- Clade: Eudicots
- Clade: Asterids
- Order: Gentianales
- Family: Gentianaceae
- Genus: Centaurium
- Species: C. littorale

Binomial name
- Centaurium littorale (Turner) Gilmour

= Centaurium littorale =

Species of flowering plant

Centaurium littorale, the seaside centaury, is a species of flowering plant belonging to the family Gentianaceae.

Its native range is Western and Northern Europe to Northern Russia.
