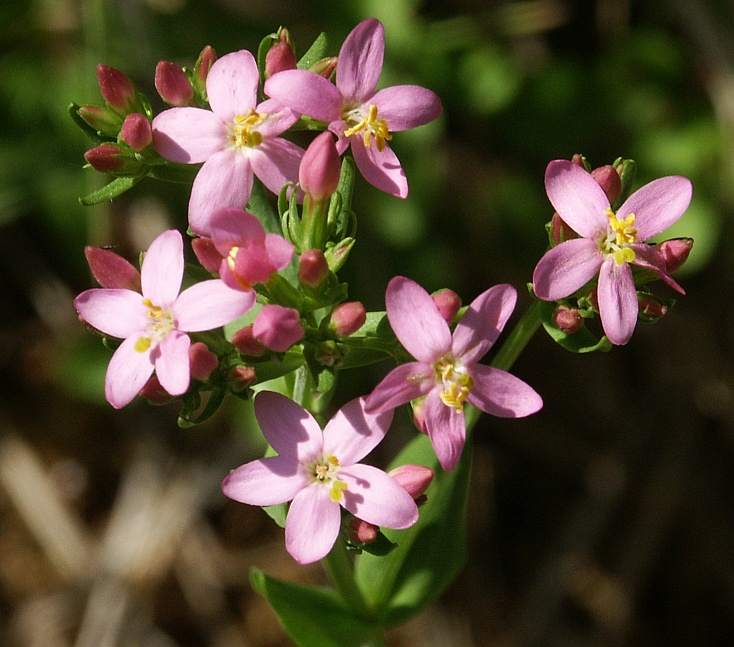

Scientific classification
- Kingdom: Plantae
- Clade: Tracheophytes
- Clade: Angiosperms
- Clade: Eudicots
- Clade: Asterids
- Order: Gentianales
- Family: Gentianaceae
- Genus: Centaurium
- Species: C. erythraea

Binomial name
- Centaurium erythraea Rafn

Subspecies
- 12; see text

Synonyms
- List: Centaurella dichotoma Delarbre; Centaurium capitatum (Willd. ex Roem. & Schult.) Borbás; Centaurium corymbosum (Dulac) Druce; Centaurium erythraea var. capitatum (Willd. ex Roem. & Schult.) Melderis; Centaurium erythraea var. fasciculare (Duby) Ubsdell; Centaurium erythraea var. latifolium (Sm.) T.C.G.Rich; Centaurium erythraea var. laxum (Boiss.) Mouterde ex Charpin & Greuter; Centaurium erythraea var. masclansii O.Bolòs & Vigo; Centaurium erythraea var. subcapitatum (Corb.) Ubsdell; Centaurium erythraea var. sublitorale (Wheldon & Salmon) Ubsdell; Centaurium latifolium (Sm.) Druce; Centaurium lomae (Gilg) Druce; Centaurium minus Moench; Centaurium minus var. austriacum (Ronniger ex Fritsch) Soó; Centaurium minus var. transiens (Wittr.) Soó; Centaurium umbellatum f. album Sigunov; Centaurium umbellatum var. fasciculare (Duby) Gilmour; Centaurium vulgare Rafn; Chironia centaurium (L.) F.W.Schmidt; Chironia centaurium var. fascicularis Duby; Chironia erythraea Schousb.; Erythraea capitata Willd. ex Roem. & Schult.; Erythraea centaurium (L.) Pers.; Erythraea centaurium f. itatiaiaensis Dusén; Erythraea corymbosa Dulac; Erythraea germanica Hoffmanns. & Link; Erythraea latifolia Sm.; Erythraea lomae Gilg; Erythraea vulgaris Gray; Gentiana centaurium L.; Gentiana gerardii F.W.Schmidt; Gentiana palustris Lam.; Gonipia linearis Raf.; Hippocentaurea centaurium Schult.; Libadion variabile Bubani; Xolemia palustris (DC.) Raf.

= Centaurium erythraea =

Species of flowering plant

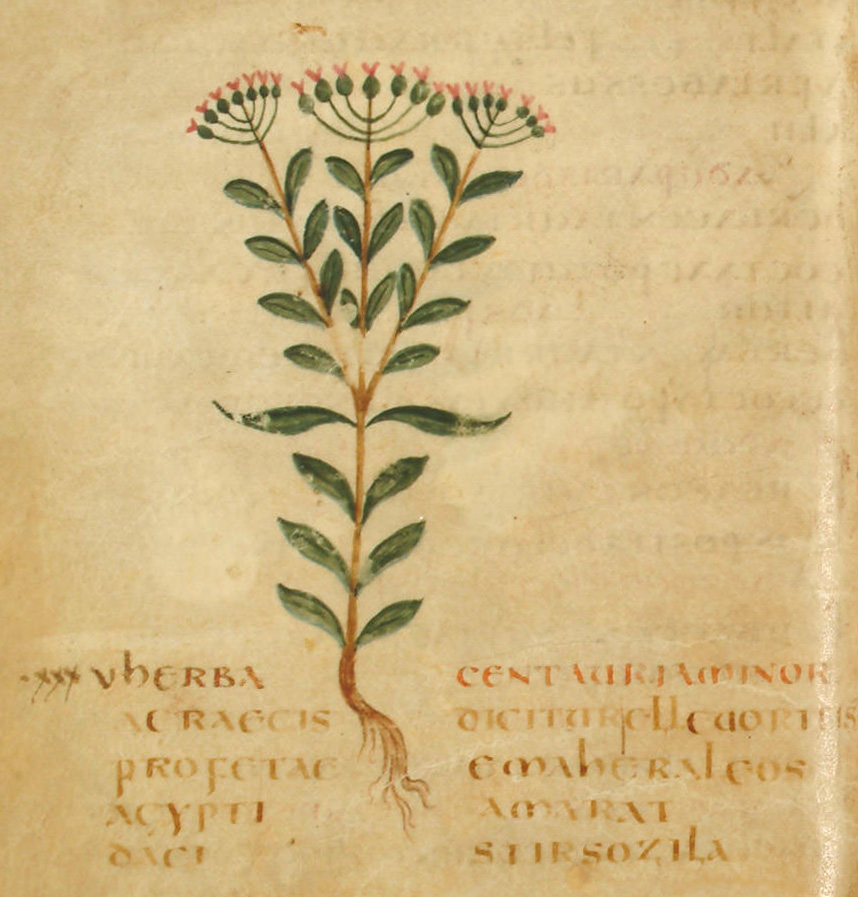
Centaurium erythraea, as depicted in 6th-century Leiden manuscript of Pseudo-Apuleius' Herbarius

Centaurium erythraea is a species of flowering plant in the gentian family known by the names common centaury and European centaury. It is also commonly known as feverfoullie, gentian or centaury.

== Description ==
This is an upright biennial herb which reaches half a meter in height. It grows from a small basal rosette and bolts a leafy, upright stem which may branch. The triangular leaves are arranged oppositely on the stem and the upright inflorescences emerge from the stem and grow parallel to it, sometimes tangling with the foliage. Each inflorescence may contain many flowers. The petite flower is pinkish-lavender and about a centimeter across, flat-faced with yellow anthers. The fruit is a cylindrical capsule.

It flowers from June until September.

== Distribution and habitat ==
This centaury is a widespread plant of Europe (including Scotland, Sweden and Mediterranean countries) and parts of western Asia and northern Africa. It has also naturalised in parts of North America, New Zealand, and eastern Australia, where it is an introduced species. It grows in fields and roadsides.

== Subspecies ==
12 subspecies are accepted.

- Centaurium erythraea subsp. apertum (H.Lindb.) Greuter – Morocco and Algeria
- Centaurium erythraea subsp. bernardii (Maire & Sauvage) Greuter – Morocco
- Centaurium erythraea subsp. boissieri (Willk.) Z.Díaz – south-central and southern Spain
- Centaurium erythraea subsp. enclusense (O.Bolòs, Molin. & P.Monts.) O.Bolòs & Vigo – Balearic Islands (Menorca)
- Centaurium erythraea subsp. erythraea – Azores, Morocco, and Europe to the Caucasus, Turkey, Syria, and Iran, and Yemen
- Centaurium erythraea subsp. grandiflorum (Biv.) Melderis – Iberian Peninsula, Corsica, Sicily, and Greece (Ionian Islands)
- Centaurium erythraea subsp. limoniiforme (Greuter) Greuter – Greece
- Centaurium erythraea subsp. majus (Hoffmanns. & Link) M.Laínz – France, Spain, Portugal, Sardinia, Sicily, Morocco, Algeria, and Tunisia
- Centaurium erythraea subsp. rhodense (Boiss. & Reut.) Melderis – Morocco and Tunisia, Corsica and Sardinia to the eastern Mediterranean
- Centaurium erythraea subsp. rumelicum (Velen.) Melderis – France, Corsica, Sardinia, Italy, Albania, Greece, Crete, and Bulgaria
- Centaurium erythraea subsp. suffruticosum (Griseb.) Greuter – France, Spain, Morocco, Algeria, and Tunisia
- Centaurium erythraea subsp. turcicum (Velen.) Melderis – Portugal and Morocco; Eastern Mediterranean to Ukraine, Central Asia, and Pakistan

== Uses ==
The European centaury is mainly prepared as a tisane for use in traditional medicine.

== Chemical constituents ==
C. erythraea contains phenolic acids, including ferulic and sinapic acids, as well as sterols (as brassicasterol and stigmasterol), secoiridoid and the glycosides, swertiamarin, and sweroside.

== Gallery ==
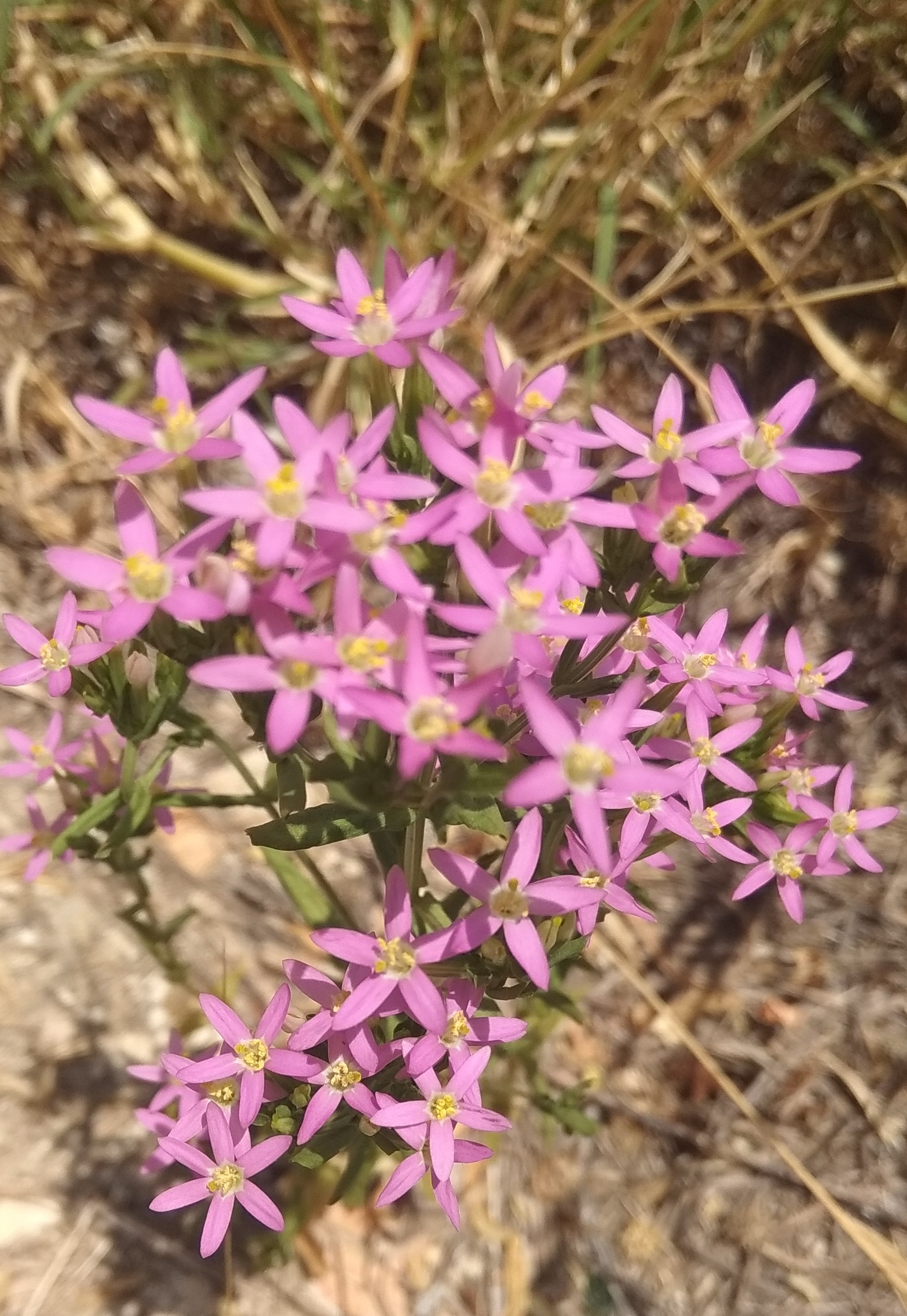
Centaurium erythraea

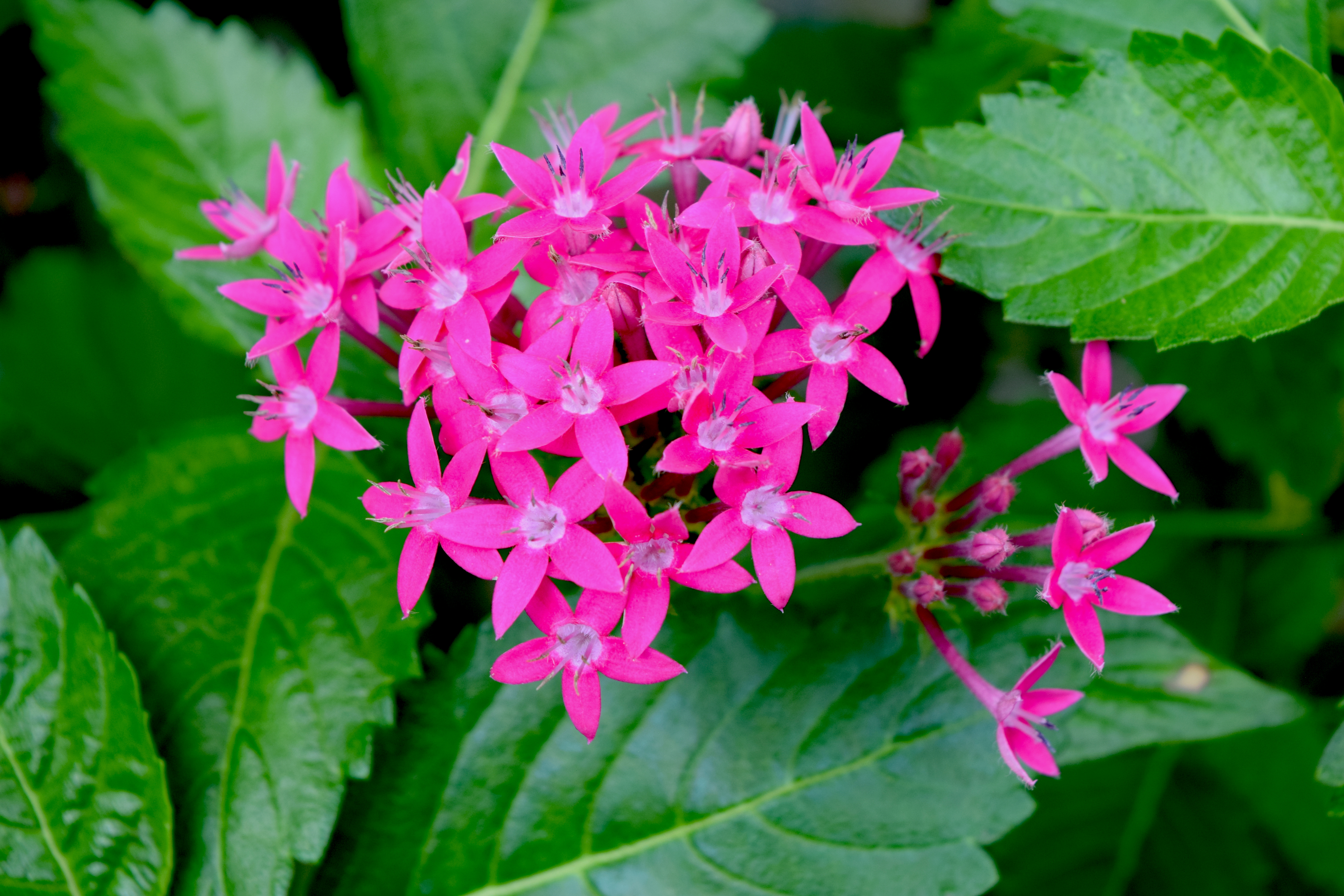
Flowers

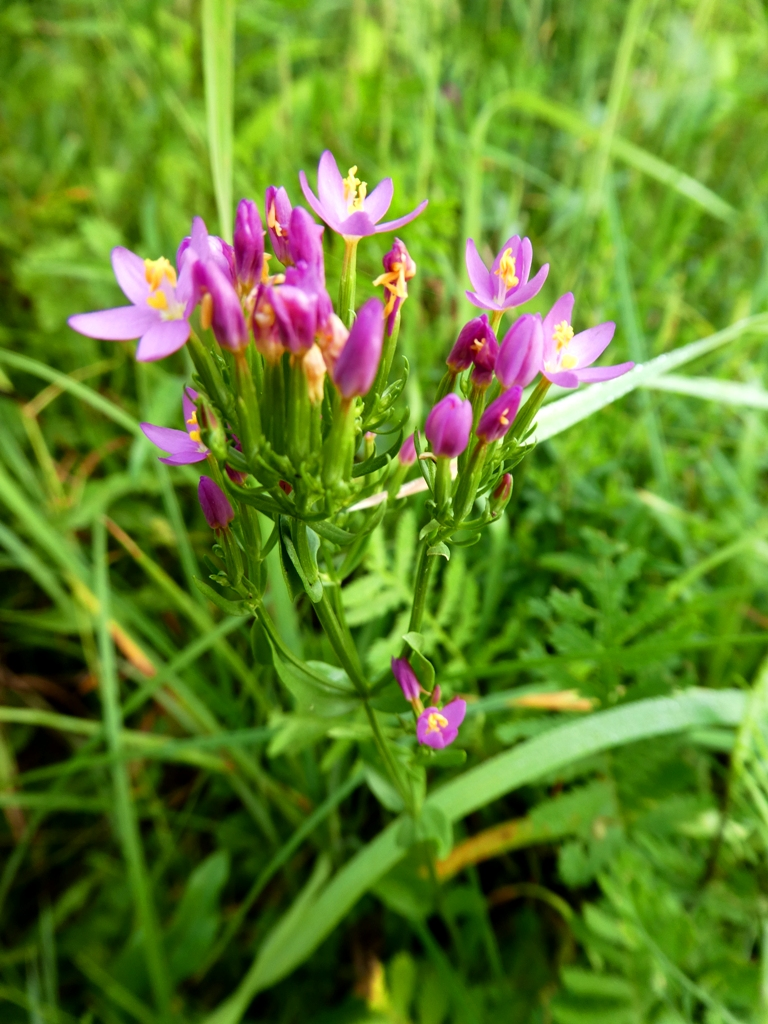
Plant
