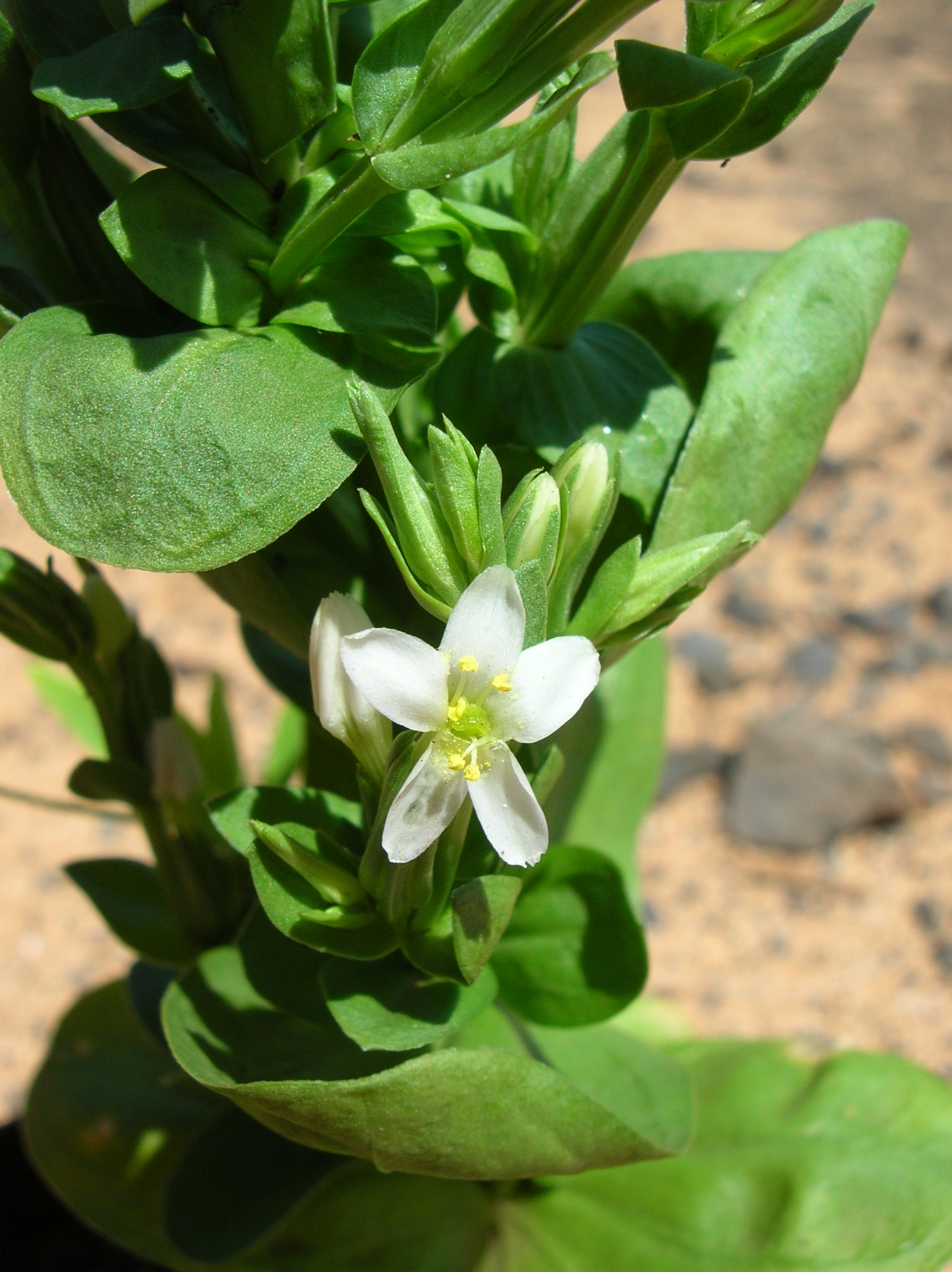
- Schenkia sebaeoides

Scientific classification
- Kingdom: Plantae
- Clade: Tracheophytes
- Clade: Angiosperms
- Clade: Eudicots
- Clade: Asterids
- Order: Gentianales
- Family: Gentianaceae
- Tribe: Chironieae
- Subtribe: Chironiinae
- Genus: Schenkia; Griseb.

Species
- Schenkia australis Schenkia sebaeoides Schenkia spicata

= Schenkia =

Genus of plants

Schenkia is a genus of flowering plants in the gentian family, Gentianaceae. It is sometimes included in the genus Centaurium.

== Selected species ==
- Schenkia australis (R.Br.) G.Mans. (Australia)
- Schenkia sebaeoides Griseb. – ʻĀwiwi (Hawaii)
- Schenkia spicata (L.) G.Mans. (North Africa, Europe, Asia)
