= Gyrandra =

Scientific classification
- Kingdom: Plantae
- Clade: Embryophytes
- Clade: Tracheophytes
- Clade: Angiosperms
- Clade: Eudicots
- Clade: Asterids
- Order: Gentianales
- Family: Gentianaceae
- Tribe: Chironieae
- Subtribe: Chironiinae
- Genus: Gyrandra; Griseb.

Species
- See text

Synonyms
- Erythraea chironioides (Griseb.) A.Gray

Genus of flowering plants

Gyrandra is a genus of flowering plants in the family Gentianaceae, found in Texas, Mexico and Central America. Annual herbs, they are usually found in montane pine-oak forests.

== Species ==
Currently accepted species include:

- Gyrandra blumbergiana (B.L.Turner) J.S.Pringle
- Gyrandra brachycalyx (Standl. & L.O.Williams) G.Mans.
- Gyrandra chironioides Griseb.
- Gyrandra pauciflora (M.Martens & Galeotti) G.Mans.
- Gyrandra pterocaulis (C.R.Broome) G.Mans.
- Gyrandra tenuifolia (M.Martens & Galeotti) G.Mans.
