= List of National Wildlife Refuges established for endangered species =

This is a list of National Wildlife Refuges established specifically for the protection of one or more endangered species on the United States Fish and Wildlife Service list of endangered mammals and birds.

State	Unit name	Species of concern	Unit area (acres)
Alabama	Sauta Cave NWR	Indiana bat, gray bat	264
	Fern Cave NWR	Indiana bat, gray bat	199
	Key Cave NWR	Alabama cavefish, gray bat	1,060
	Watercress Darter NWR	Watercress darter	25
Arizona	Buenos Aires NWR	Masked bobwhite quail	116,585
	Leslie Canyon NWR	Gila topminnow, Yaqui chub, peregrine falcon	2,765
	San Bernardino NWR	Gila topminnow, Yaqui chub, Yaqui catfish, beautiful shiner, Huachuca water umbel	2,369
Arkansas	Logan Cave NWR	Cave crayfish, gray bat, Indiana bat, Ozark cavefish	124
California	Antioch Dunes NWR	Lange's metalmark butterfly, Antioch Dunes evening-primrose, Contra Costa wallflower	55
	Bitter Creek NWR	California condor	14,054
	Blue Ridge NWR	California condor	897
	Castle Rock NWR	Aleutian Canada goose	14
	Coachella Valley NWR	Coachella Valley fringe-toed lizard	3,592
	Don Edwards San Francisco Bay NWR	California clapper rail, California least tern, salt marsh harvest mouse	21,524
	Ellicott Slough NWR	Santa Cruz long-toed salamander	139
	Hopper Mountain NWR	California condor	2,471
	Sacramento River NWR	Valley elderberry longhorn beetle, bald eagle, least Bell's vireo	7,884
	San Diego NWR	San Diego fairy shrimp, San Diego mesa mint, Otay mesa mint, California Orcutt grass, San Diego button-celery	1,840
	San Joaquin River NWR	Aleutian Canada goose	1,638
	Seal Beach NWR	Light-footed clapper rail, California least tern	911
	Sweetwater Marsh NWR	Light-footed clapper rail	316
	Tijuana Slough NWR	Light-footed clapper rail	1,023
Florida	Archie Carr NWR	Loggerhead sea turtle, green sea turtle	29
	Crocodile Lake NWR	American crocodile	6,686
	Crystal River NWR	West Indian manatee	80
	Florida Panther NWR	Florida panther	23,379
	Hobe Sound NWR	Loggerhead sea turtle, green sea turtle	980
	Lake Wales Ridge NWR	Florida scrub jay, snakeroot, scrub blazing star, Carter's mustard, papery Whitlow-wort, Florida bonamia, scrub lupine, highlands scrub hypericum, Garrett's mint, scrub mint, pygmy fringe-tree, wireweed, Florida ziziphus, scrub plum, eastern indigo snake, bluetail mole skink, sand skink	659
	National Key Deer Refuge	Key deer	8,542
	St. Johns NWR	Dusky seaside sparrow	6,255
Hawaii	Hakalau Forest NWR	Akepa, akiapolaau, 'o'u, Hawaiian hawk, Hawaiian creeper	32,730
	Hanalei NWR	Hawaiian stilt, Hawaiian coot, Hawaiian gallinule, Hawaiian duck	917
	Huleia NWR	Hawaiian stilt, Hawaiian coot, Hawaiian gallinule, Hawaiian duck	241
	James C. Campbell NWR	Hawaiian stilt, Hawaiian coot, Hawaiian gallinule, Hawaiian duck	164
	Kakahaia NWR	Hawaiian stilt, Hawaiian coot	45
	Kealia Pond NWR	Hawaiian stilt, Hawaiian coot	691
	Pearl Harbor NWR	Hawaiian stilt	61
Iowa	Driftless Area NWR	Iowa Pleistocene snail	521
Massachusetts	Massasoit NWR	Plymouth red-bellied turtle	184
Michigan	Kirtlands Warbler Wildlife Management Area	Kirtland's warbler	6,535
Mississippi	Mississippi Sandhill Crane NWR	Mississippi sandhill crane	19,713
Missouri	Ozark Cavefish NWR	Ozark cavefish	42
	Pilot Knob NWR	Indiana bat	90
Montana	Red Rock LakesNWR	Trumpeter swan	65,810
Nebraska	Karl E. Mundt NWR	Bald eagle	19
Nevada	Ash Meadows NWR	Devil's Hole pupfish, Warm Springs pupfish, Ash Meadows Amargosa pupfish, Ash Meadows speckled dace, Ash Meadows naucorid, Ash Meadows blazing star, Amargosa niterwort, Ash Meadows milk-vetch, Ash Meadows sunray, spring-loving centaury, Ash Meadows gumplant, Ash Meadows ivesia	13,268
	Moapa Valley NWR	Moapa dace	32
Oklahoma	Ozark Plateau NWR	Ozark big-eared bat, gray bat	2,208
Oregon	Bear Valley NWR	Bald eagle	4,200
	Julia Butler Hansen Refuge for the Columbian White-tail Deer	Columbian white-tailed deer	2,750
	Nestucca Bay NWR	Aleutian Canada goose	457
Puerto Rico	Cabo Rojo NWR	Yellow-shouldered blackbird	1,836
	Culebra NWR	Hawksbill sea turtle, leatherback sea turtle	1,450
	Desecheo NWR	Hawksbill sea turtle, Puerto Rico applecactus	360
	Laguna Cartagena NWR	Yellow-shouldered blackbird	1,059
	Vieques NWR	Antillean manatee, hawksbill sea turtle, leatherback sea turtle	
South Dakota	Karl E. Mundt NWR	Bald eagle	1,044
Texas	Attwater Prairie Chicken NWR	Attwater's greater prairie chicken	8,007
	Balcones Canyonlands NWR	Black-capped vireo, golden-cheeked warbler	14,144
US Virgin Islands	Green Cay NWR	St. Croix ground lizard	14
	Sandy Point NWR	Leatherback sea turtle	327
Virginia	James River NWR	Bald eagle	4,147
	Mason Neck NWR	Bald eagle	2,276
Washington	Julia Butler Hansen Refuge for the Columbian White-tail Deer	Columbian white-tailed deer	2,777
Wyoming	Mortenson Lake NWR	Wyoming toad	1,776
