= Moapa =

Moapa may mean:

== People ==
- Moapa Band of Paiute Indians

== Places ==
- Moapa River Indian Reservation, an Indian Reservation in Southern Nevada that is home to some members of the Southern Paiute
- Moapa, Nevada, a small unincorporated community in Southern Nevada
- Moapa Valley, Nevada, a valley in Southern Nevada in which the towns of Moapa, Logandale and Overton are located
- Moapa Valley National Wildlife Refuge, a wildlife refuge at the headwaters of the Muddy River in Southern Nevada
- Muddy River (Nevada), previously called the Moapa River, a short river in Southern Nevada that flows from the Moapa Valley to Lake Mead

== Other ==
- Moapa, the genus of the Moapa dace, a small, rare fish of Southern Nevada
