= Warm Springs =

Warm Springs may refer to:

- Warm Springs Apache, a subdivision of the Chiricahua Apache
- Warm Springs, California, in Riverside County
- Warm Springs, Fremont, California
  - Warm Springs Elementary School, elementary school in Fremont, California
  - Warm Springs/South Fremont station, a Bay Area Rapid Transit station in Fremont, California
- Warm Springs, Georgia, location of Franklin Delano Roosevelt's Little White House
  - Roosevelt Warm Springs Institute for Rehabilitation.
  - Warm Springs (film), a 2005 movie about Roosevelt's struggle with paralytic illness
- Warm Springs, Montana
- Warm Springs, Nevada
- Warm Springs Natural Area
- Warm Springs Indian Reservation, Oregon
  - Warm Springs, Oregon, located on the Warm Springs Indian Reservation
  - Warm Springs bands, common contemporary name of the Tenino people
- Warm Springs (Utah), at Warm Springs Mountain, east Goshen Valley, Utah
- Warm Springs, Virginia
- An early alternative name for Berkeley Springs, West Virginia
- Warm Mineral Springs, Florida
