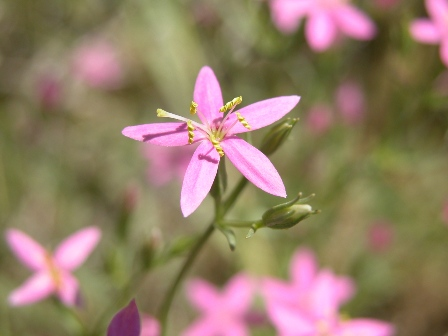

Conservation status
- Critically Imperiled (NatureServe)

Scientific classification
- Kingdom: Plantae
- Clade: Tracheophytes
- Clade: Angiosperms
- Clade: Eudicots
- Clade: Asterids
- Order: Gentianales
- Family: Gentianaceae
- Genus: Zeltnera
- Species: Z. namatophila

Binomial name
- Zeltnera namatophila (Reveal, C.R.Broome, & Beatley) G.Mans.

Synonyms
- Centaurium namophilum Reveal, C.R.Broome & Beatley (original spelling); Centaurium namatophilum Reveal, C.R.Broome & Beatley (subsequent correction of spelling)

= Zeltnera namatophila =

Species of flowering plant

Zeltnera namatophila, the spring-loving centaury, is a rare species of flowering plant in the gentian family. It is endemic to the Amargosa Valley, in Nye County, southwestern Nevada.

== Scientific name ==
The name was originally spelled as Centaurium namophilum. In the protologue, the authors provided the etymology for the name, stating it was derived from the Greek nama (spring) and philos (loving). As the genitive of 'nama' is 'namatos', the compound name should have been 'namatophilum', and it was subsequently corrected.

== Distribution ==
The plant is endemic to Ash Meadows, in the Amargosa Desert directly east of Death Valley National Park. It has been recorded as being present in California in 1978, but no occurrences have been recently confirmed there.

The plant grows in moist and wet soils in the ash meadows wetlands. The soil has a high clay content and a high pH, with salts remaining as water is evaporated in the desert air. The plant occurs in meadows of saltgrass (Distichlis spicata) and next to streams, springs, and seeps.

Other plants in the area include Ash Meadows gumplant (Grindelia fraxino-pratensis), Emory baccharis (Baccharis emoryi), and Tecopa bird's beak (Cordylanthus tecopensis).

== Description ==
Zeltnera namatophila is an annual herb producing a branching stem up to 45 centimeters tall. The plant blooms during the heat of summer, from July to September. The flower is roughly a centimeter wide with a deep pink corolla tinged yellow in the throat.

The fruit is a capsule containing about 50 seeds, and each plant can produce many capsules. It is thought to be a ruderal species, producing many tiny seeds that spread about and sprout up in disturbed habitat in a weedlike manner. The seeds probably also persist for a long time in the soil seed bank.

== Conservation ==
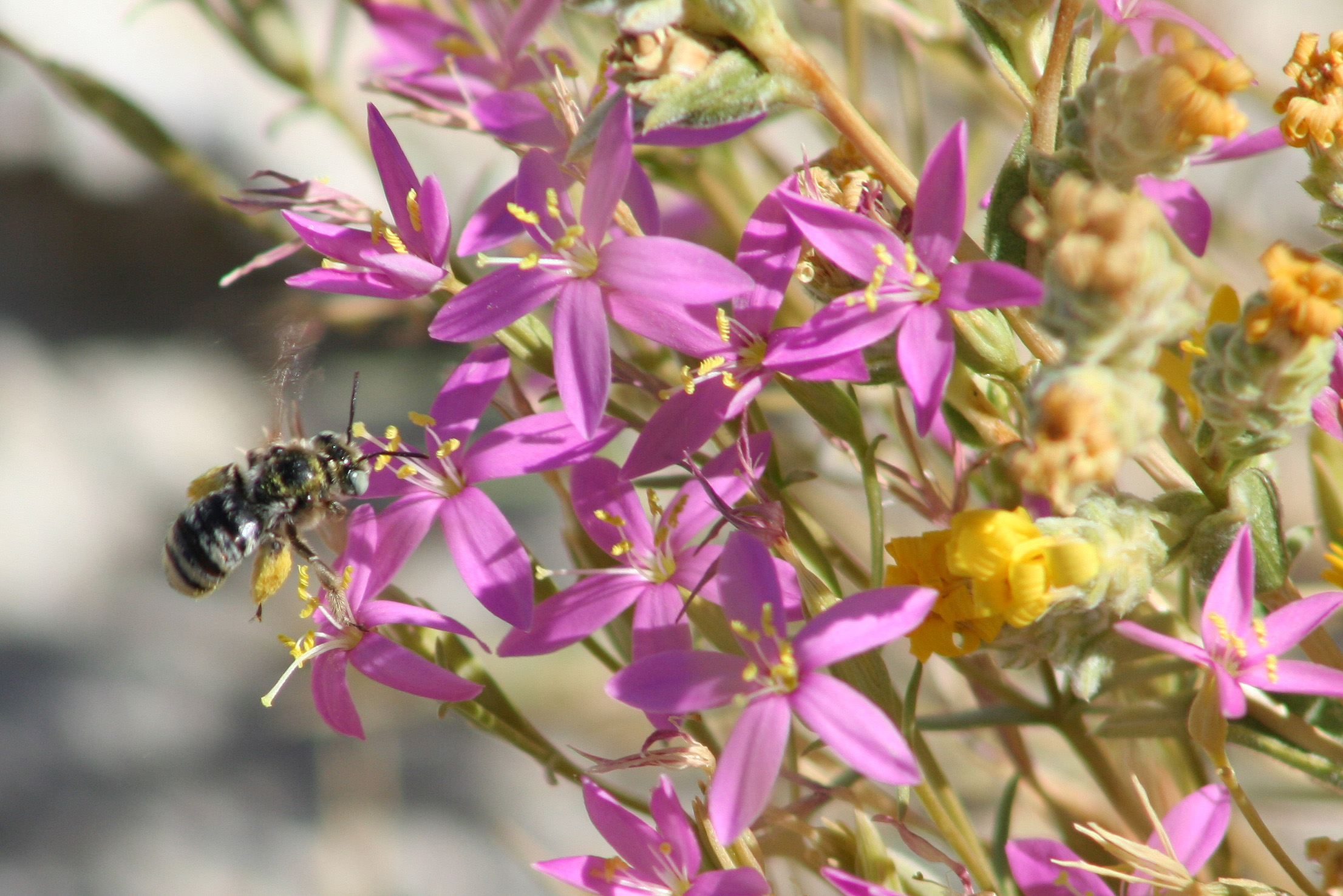
Flowers and pollinator

Zeltnera namatophila is a federally listed threatened species of the United States and is listed as a critically endangered and fully protected species by the State of Nevada.

There are six main populations of the plant in the Ash Meadows area, including adjacent Bureau of Land Management territory, and the total global population is estimated to exceed four million plants. What seems like a large number is actually very limited in distribution and divided among the six populations, when the plant is thought to have been widespread throughout the area before the 1960s.

These remaining populations are directly threatened by alterations in the hydrology of the area, as water is the limiting factor for the species. This and other rare plants, including many Ash Meadows endemics, are declining there because the water table is dropping due to groundwater pumping.

This plant would probably be plentiful in pristine conditions, considering its having once been widespread and its ability to grow like a weed in many kinds of local moist habitat. The continuing loss of the natural water regime in the area, however, has limited it, but to what extent is not certain. Other threats and potential threats include trampling by mustangs, cattle grazing, mining for clay minerals such as bentonite, sepiolite, and saponite, and introduced plant species such as yellow starthistle (Centaurea solstitialis) and saltcedar (Tamarix ramosissima). So far, refuge workers have kept these invasive plants to a manageable level.
