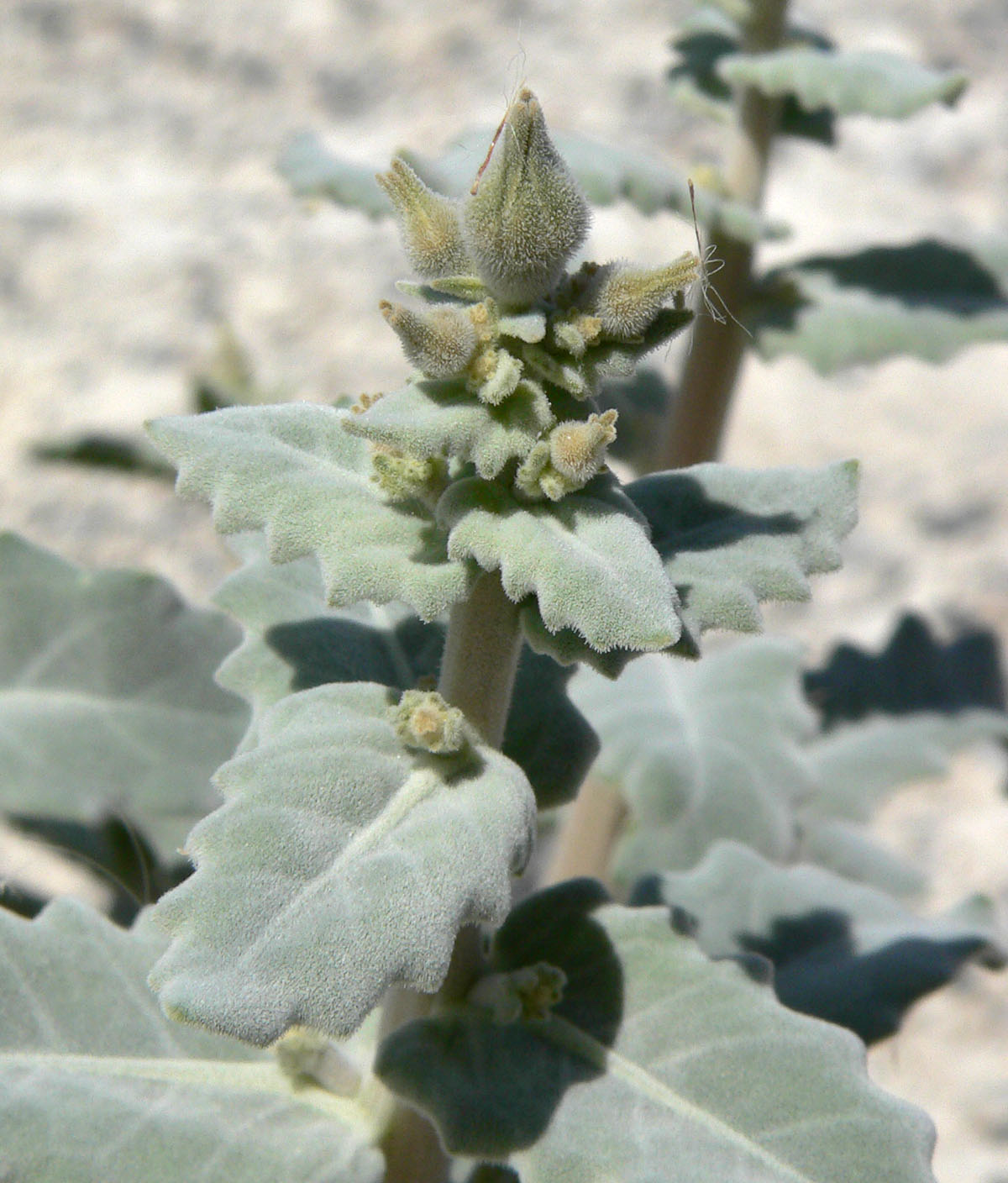

Conservation status
- Critically Imperiled (NatureServe)

Scientific classification
- Kingdom: Plantae
- Clade: Tracheophytes
- Clade: Angiosperms
- Clade: Eudicots
- Clade: Asterids
- Order: Cornales
- Family: Loasaceae
- Genus: Mentzelia
- Species: M. leucophylla

Binomial name
- Mentzelia leucophylla Brandegee

= Mentzelia leucophylla =

Species of flowering plant

Mentzelia leucophylla, known by the common name Ash Meadows blazingstar, is a rare species of flowering plant in the Loasaceae. It is endemic to southwestern Nevada, in the Western United States.

== Distribution ==
The locally endemic plant is only known from southern Nye County in southwestern Nevada. It is one of the several rare plants only found at (endemic to) Ash Meadows in the Amargosa Desert, an area with a unique desert wetland ecosystem. It is threatened by habitat degradation.

== Description ==
Mentzelia leucophylla is a biennial or perennial herb growing up to 0.5 metres (1.6 ft) tall. The stem and herbage are coated in tiny white hairs, making them pale and velvety.

The wide inflorescence bears bright yellow flowers in May through to September. The flowers open for a short time in the afternoon.

== Conservation ==
Mentzelia leucophylla is federally listed as a threatened species and is listed as a critically endangered and fully protected species by the State of Nevada.

== Ash Meadows ==
Ash Meadows is a stretch of desert floor with areas of wetland habitat kept moist by springs and seeps originating from a supply of groundwater under the Amargosa Valley. This water supports a variety of flora and fauna, including many rare and endemic taxa such as Ash Meadows milkvetch (Astragalus phoenix) and Ash Meadows sunray (Enceliopsis nudicaulis var. corrugata), which are found growing alongside the Ash Meadows blazingstar. A portion of the habitat is protected within the Ash Meadows National Wildlife Refuge, a unit in the regional Desert National Wildlife Refuge Complex.

The substrate is fine-grained sand and clay crusted with salt and alkaline in pH. The area is generally dominated by shadscale (Atriplex confertifolia) and associated halophytic vegetation.

For many decades the Ash Meadows area has been disturbed by a number of human activities, including peat mining, construction of roads, real estate development, and agricultural practices such as plowing, water diversion, and grazing. The pumping of groundwater proved to be a serious threat, as it lowered the high water table that supports the ecosystem.

== See also ==
- Ash Meadows National Wildlife Refuge
