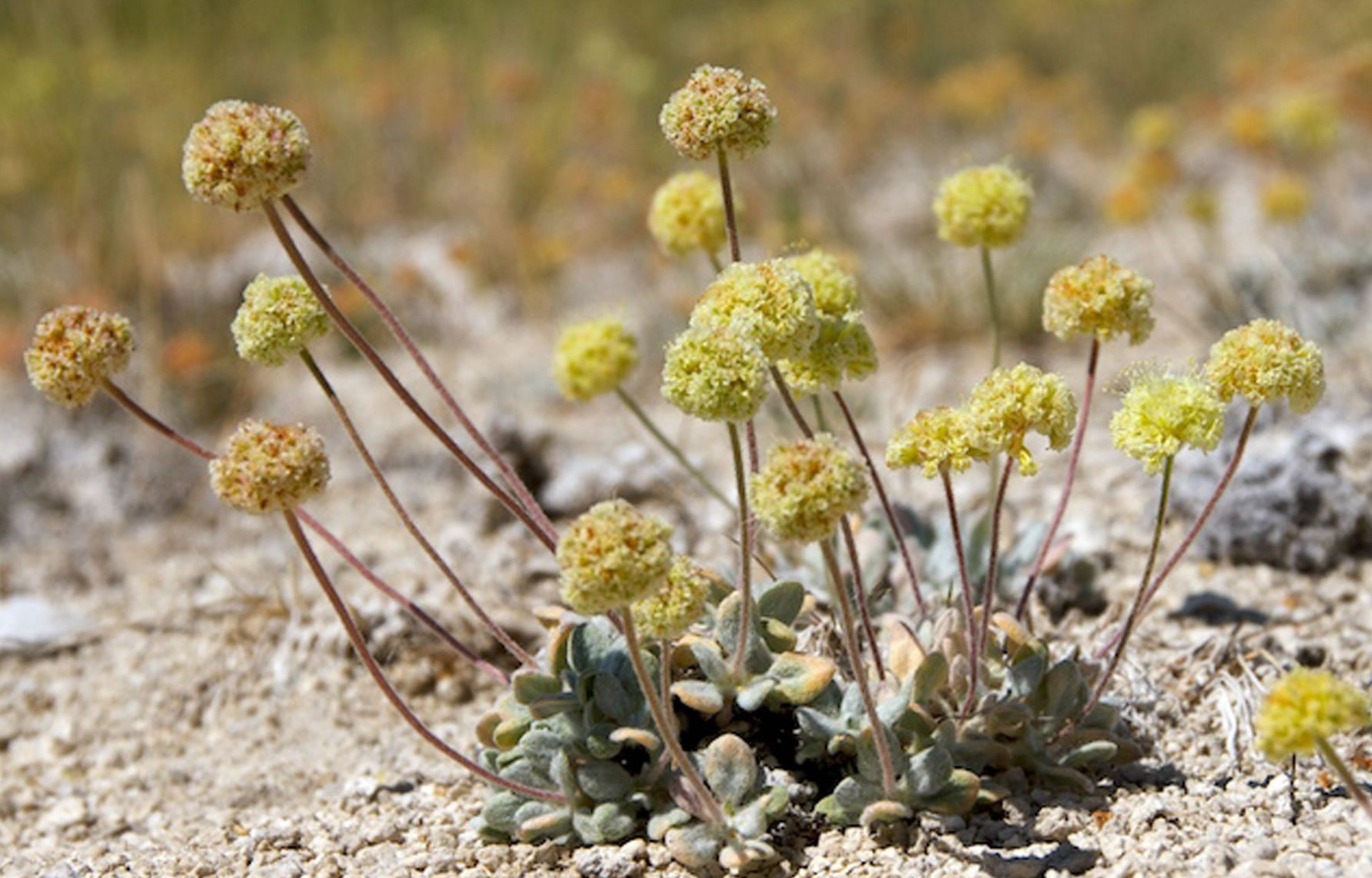

Conservation status
- Critically Imperiled (NatureServe)

Scientific classification
- Kingdom: Plantae
- Clade: Embryophytes
- Clade: Tracheophytes
- Clade: Angiosperms
- Clade: Eudicots
- Order: Caryophyllales
- Family: Polygonaceae
- Genus: Eriogonum
- Species: E. argophyllum

Binomial name
- Eriogonum argophyllum Reveal

= Eriogonum argophyllum =

Species of wild buckwheat

Eriogonum argophyllum is a species of wild buckwheat known by the common names Sulphur Hot Springs buckwheat, Silver Lake buckwheat, and Ruby Valley buckwheat. It is endemic to Nevada in the United States, where there is only one known population.

This plant only grows in the Ruby Valley of Elko County, Nevada. It grows in the wetlands associated with hot springs, and depends on the water for survival. It grows in shallow, sandy soils covered in a crust of minerals left by the evaporation of the water. Associated plants include Senecio canus, Ivesia kingii, Bromus tectorum, Zeltnera exaltata, and Ericameria nauseosa.

== Description ==
This rare plant is a mat-forming perennial herb growing just a few centimeters tall. It is covered in gray woolly fibers. It produces erect stems a few centimeters tall topped with rounded inflorescences no more than a centimeter wide. The flowers are yellow. Flowering occurs in June and July, sometimes until September.

As with other species of buckwheats, E. argophyllum has small, aggregated, open flowers that are readily accessible to being visited by a large assortment of insects. Pollinators include bees in the family Halictidae, wasps in the families Sphecidae and Pompilidae, and flies in the families Syrphidae, Stratiomyidae, and Tachinidae. Flies and wasps in these families are the most frequent and common pollinator.

== Taxonomy ==
Eriogonum argophyllum was scientifically described and named by James L. Reveal in 1972. It is classified in the Eriogonum genus within the Polygonaceae family and the species has no botanical synonyms.

== Conservation ==
Eriogonum argophyllum is listed as a critically endangered and fully protected species by the State of Nevada. This species was a candidate for federal protection because its single population was considered threatened by geothermal development, livestock, and off-road vehicle use. These threats have been eliminated and the plant is no longer a candidate. A fence is in place around the population to keep out livestock and vehicles.
