= Beatley =

Beatley may refer to:

- Charles E. Beatley (1916–2003), American politician
- Clara Bancroft Beatley (1858–1923), American educator, lecturer, author
- Janice C. Beatley (1919–1987), American botanist
- Timothy Beatley, American sustainable city researcher and author
- William Beatley (1923–2005), British fencer
