= Warm Springs Natural Area =

Protected land in Nevada, U.S.

Coordinates: 36°42′42″N 114°42′47″W

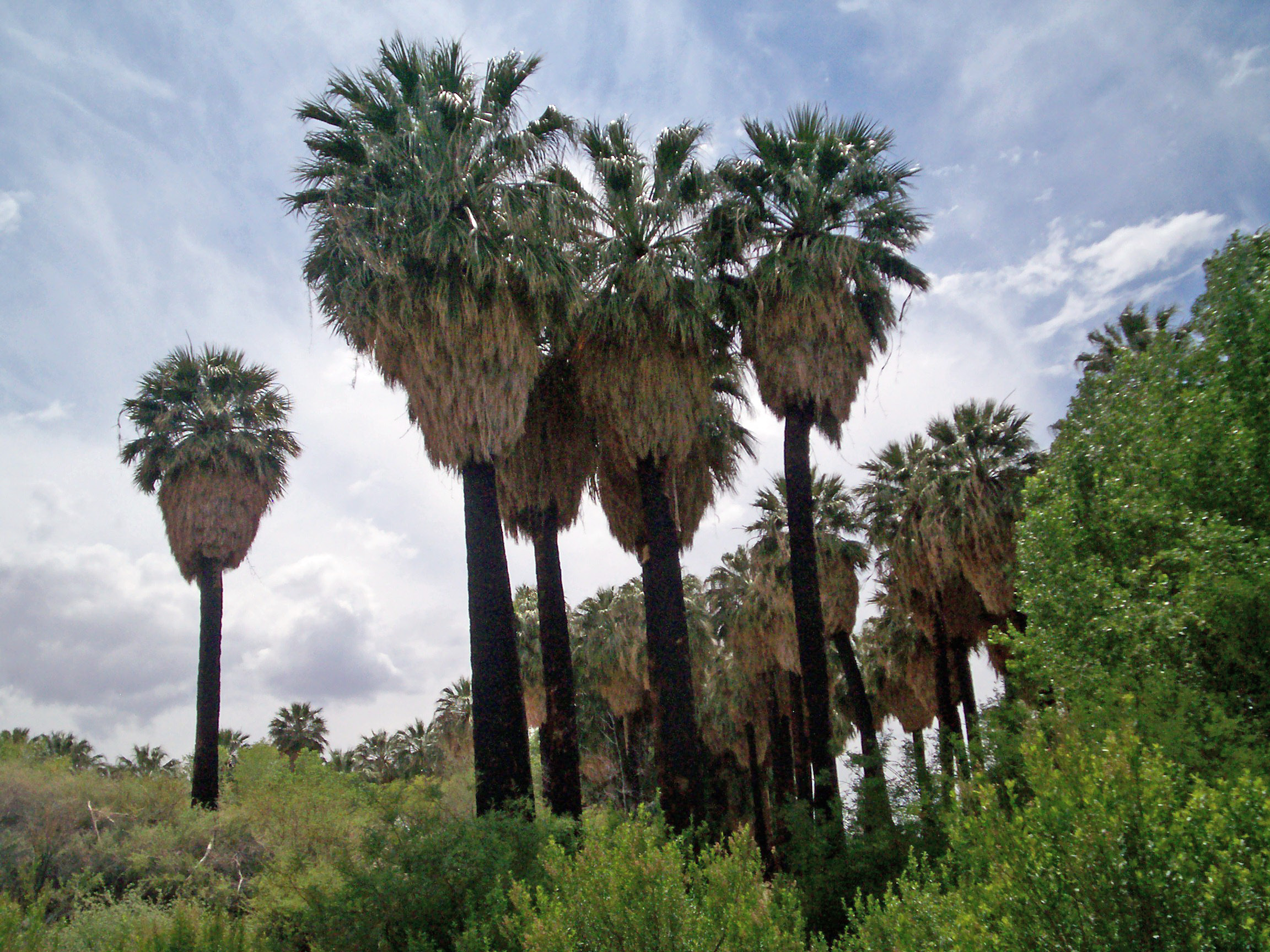
California Fan Palm growing wild at Warm Springs

The Warm Springs Natural Area, also known as the Warm Springs Ranch, is located near the Moapa Indian Reservation in Clark County, Nevada, at an elevation of 2,123 feet (647 m). The 1,179-acre (477 ha) area is owned by the Southern Nevada Water Authority (SNWA). The area is a natural oasis in the Mojave Desert. The oasis is fed by close to 24 natural warm springs and contains many naturally occurring California fan palms (Washingtonia filifera), creating an ecosystem normally limited to the "low" Colorado Desert and so unique to the "high" Mojave Desert. The springs are the headwaters for the Muddy River.

The area is popular for residential and recreational uses. There are year-round residents that own private property with homes. There are camping areas for recreational vehicles and a private, multi-use, recreation area owned by the Church of Jesus Christ of Latter-day Saints (LDS Church).

== History ==
Howard Hughes purchased the 1,218-acre (493 ha) ranch in 1968. The LDS church acquired much of the Ranch in 1978 and attempted to continue its use as an operating ranch. When they were unsuccessful in ranching including cattle grazing, the LDS church sold most of the land, keeping 75 acres (30 ha) operated as the Warm Springs Recreational Ranch. A public swimming facility separate from the Hughes ranch and the LDS facility was also developed in the area. The 100 acre Desert Oasis Warm Springs was a popular summer destination for many Las Vegas residents in the 1970s and 1980s.

The Southern Nevada Water Authority acquired large portions of the old ranch property in 2007 with the intention to protect the headwaters of the Muddy River and the habitat of the endangered Moapa dace.

On July 1, 2010, an accidental fire swept through the overgrown palm trees, burning much of the area and destroying many buildings including the original ranch house at the LDS Warm Springs ranch. The LDS facility was rebuilt and opened for use of members of the LDS church in June 2017.

The 1,220 acres acquired by the Southern Nevada Water Authority is now known as the Warm Springs Natural Area and has been developed into a nature conservancy and publicly accessible nature area with trails and exhibits.

== Moapa Valley National Wildlife Refuge ==
The United States Fish and Wildlife Service established the Moapa Valley National Wildlife Refuge area of Warm Springs as a wildlife preserve to protect the habitat of Moapa dace, a critically endangered species of fish that is endemic to the Muddy River. The Moapa dace have declined in population due to habitat destruction and introduced species of non-native fish. This unique small area of 106 acres (43 ha), and the fish, have many stakeholders in their ongoing preservation.
