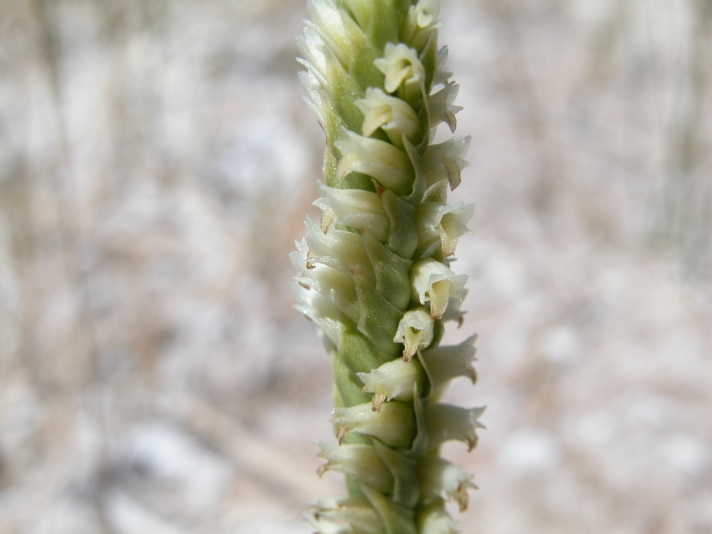

Conservation status
- Imperiled (NatureServe)

Scientific classification
- Kingdom: Plantae
- Clade: Tracheophytes
- Clade: Angiosperms
- Clade: Monocots
- Order: Asparagales
- Family: Orchidaceae
- Subfamily: Orchidoideae
- Tribe: Cranichideae
- Genus: Spiranthes
- Species: S. infernalis

Binomial name
- Spiranthes infernalis Sheviak

= Spiranthes infernalis =

Ash Meadows lady's tresses

Species of orchid

Spiranthes infernalis, common name Ash Meadows lady's tresses, is a rare species of orchid known from only four locations in Nevada, all close to one another. The type locale is inside Ash Meadows National Wildlife Refuge, in Nye County approximately 90 miles (140 km) WNW of Las Vegas. The site is a seasonally wet meadow.

The epithet infernalis means "of the underworld" or "of the nether regions", in reference to the extremely hot climate of the region.

== Description ==
Spiranthes infernalis is a terrestrial herb up to 40 cm (16 inches) tall. It has tuberous roots. Leaves are lanceolate, up to 15 cm (6 inches) long. The flowers are yellowish-white with an orange lip, borne in a tightly spiralled spike.
