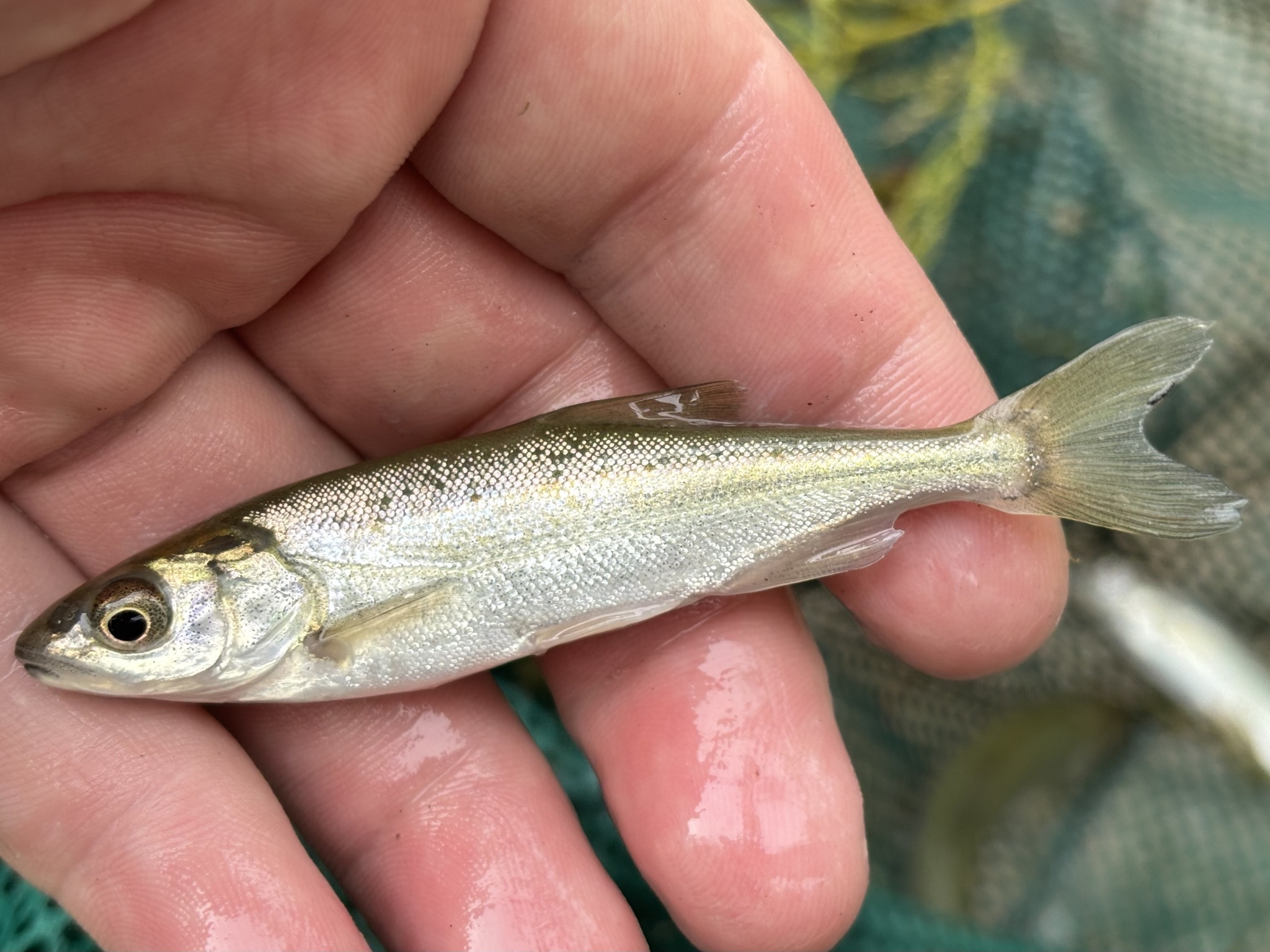

Conservation status
- Endangered (IUCN 3.1)

- Endangered (ESA)

Scientific classification
- Kingdom: Animalia
- Phylum: Chordata
- Class: Actinopterygii
- Order: Cypriniformes
- Family: Leuciscidae
- Genus: Gila
- Species: G. seminuda

Binomial name
- Gila seminuda Cope & Yarrow, 1875

= Virgin chub =

Species of fish

The Virgin chub or the Virgin River chub (Gila seminuda) is a species of freshwater ray-finned fish belonging to the family Leuciscidae, which includes the daces, chubs, Eurasian minnows and related species. This is a medium-sized, silvery minnow, generally less than 15 cm (5.9 in) long and reaching lengths of 25 cm (9.8 in). The back, breast, and part of the belly are embedded with small scales, naked in some individuals. The length of the head divided by the depth of the caudal peduncle typically results in a ratio of 4.0 to 5.0 (rarely exceeding 5.0, which approximates G. elegans). The scales are typically lacking basal radii or are with extremely faint lines.

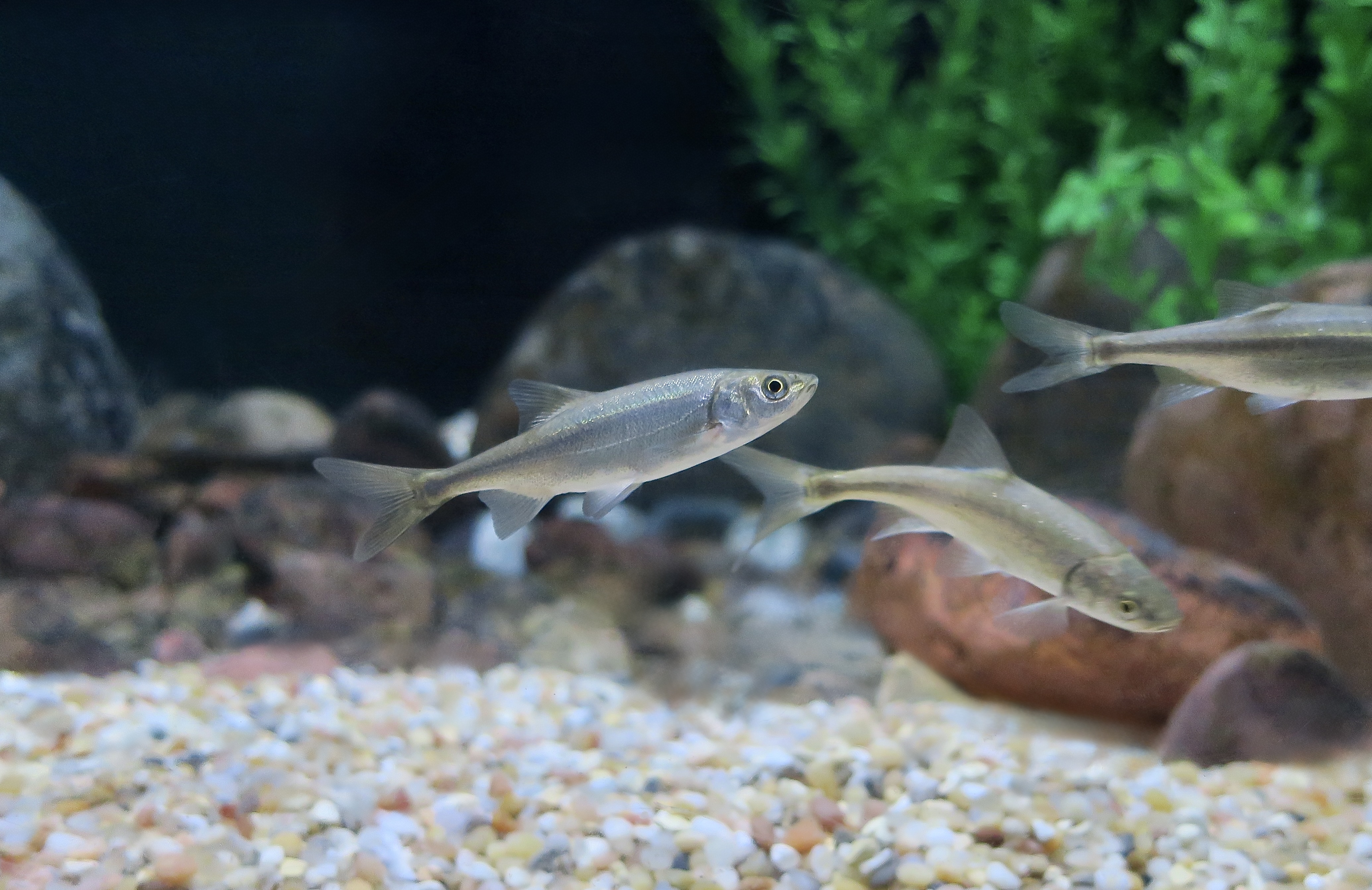
At Arizona-Sonora Desert Museum.

== Range ==
It is restricted to two tributaries of the Colorado River, the Virgin River in Arizona, Nevada, and Utah, and the upper and middle reaches of the Muddy River in Nevada. The Arizona range of the Virgin chub is restricted to the Virgin River within Mohave County.

== Habitat ==
In its native habitat, it occurs only in the generally warm, turbid, and saline mainstream of the Virgin and Muddy Rivers, and very rarely in the immediate mouths of their major tributaries. The Virgin chub is most common in deeper areas where waters are swift, but not turbulent, and most often is associated with boulders or other types of cover.

== Population trends ==
The Virgin chub is continuing to decline. In 1988 an attempt to remove red shiners (which are a common competitor with the Virgin chub) from 35 km (22 mi) of habitat on the Virgin River, ended in failure as populations of Virgin chub continued to be decimated by other factors including habitat modifications.

== Management factors ==
Activities that are known to be detrimental to Virgin chub populations are the de-watering of habitats through the re-routing of stream water, stream impoundment, channelization, domestic livestock grazing, timber harvesting, mining, road construction, polluting, and stocking non-natives.

Threats: widespread modification and reduction of habitat; dewatering by agricultural diversion; increased temperature, salinity, and turbidity of the Virgin River; introduction of non-native fish and parasite species.

Management needs: protect and enhance habitat, including water quantity and quality; ameliorate effects of nonnative fish species in chub waters; re-establish additional populations.

== Hybrid origin ==
The Virgin chub likely evolved via introgressive hybridization between the roundtail chub, G. robusta, and the bonytail chub, G. elegans. Evidence for a hybrid origin of the Virgin chub is based on morphology and allozymes. The mitochondrial DNA of the Virgin chub is nearly identical to that of G. elegans.
