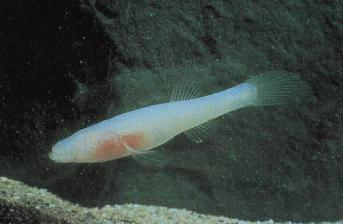

Conservation status
- Near Threatened (IUCN 3.1)

- Vulnerable (NatureServe)

Scientific classification
- Kingdom: Animalia
- Phylum: Chordata
- Class: Actinopterygii
- Order: Percopsiformes
- Family: Amblyopsidae
- Genus: Troglichthys
- Species: T. rosae

Binomial name
- Troglichthys rosae (C. H. Eigenmann, 1898)

Synonyms
- Typhlichthys rosae Eigenmann, 1898; Amblyopsis rosae (Eigenmann, 1898)

= Ozark cavefish =

Species of fish

The Ozark cavefish, Troglichthys rosae, is a small subterranean freshwater fish endemic to the United States. It has been listed as a threatened species in the US since 1984; the IUCN currently lists the species as Near Threatened, though it was previously listed as Vulnerable (VU D1+2 v2.3) between 1986 and 1996. It is listed as Endangered and Threatened by the Missouri Department of Conservation.

== Description ==
The Ozark cavefish is pinkish-white and reaches a maximum length of 2 inches (5.1 cm). The head is flattened, and it has a slightly protruding lower jaw. The fish has no pelvic fin; the dorsal and anal fins are further back than on most fish. It has only rudimentary eyes and no optic nerve. The Ozark cavefish lives only in caves. It has no pigmentation and has lost some unused characteristics. However, it is accustomed to a cave environment due to well-developed sensory papillae. They feed primarily on microscopic organisms, as well as small crustaceans and salamander larvae. Their reproductive rate is low compared to most other fish.

== Habitat ==
Caves which have populations of the Ozark cavefish all have a relatively large source of nutrients, such as bat guano or blown leaf litter. Water quality in caves containing them is usually high. This is in part due to the role this species plays in preserving cave ecosystems through its feeding activity. Ozark cavefish are able to tolerate the extremely low oxygen content of ground water found in caves. They tend to occur in flowing cave streams as opposed to quiet pools. The Ozark cavefish can receive nutrients from the tree roots above the cave. The roots are full of nutrients and water. The roots spread photosynthetic products in the cave, so organisms like Ozark cavefish and other species are able to feed on the roots.

== Distribution ==
The geographic distribution of Ozark cavefish consists of northeastern Oklahoma, northwestern Arkansas, and southwestern Missouri. The fish is native to the Springfield Plateau of the Ozark Highlands. Currently, 15 caves in this area have verified populations. In Oklahoma, populations are known to occur in Delaware County. Historical records for Ottawa and Mayes Counties also indicate populations. Factors that have led to the decline of the Ozark cavefish include destruction of habitat, collecting of specimens, and disturbance by spelunkers.

== See also ==
- Ozark Cavefish National Wildlife Refuge
