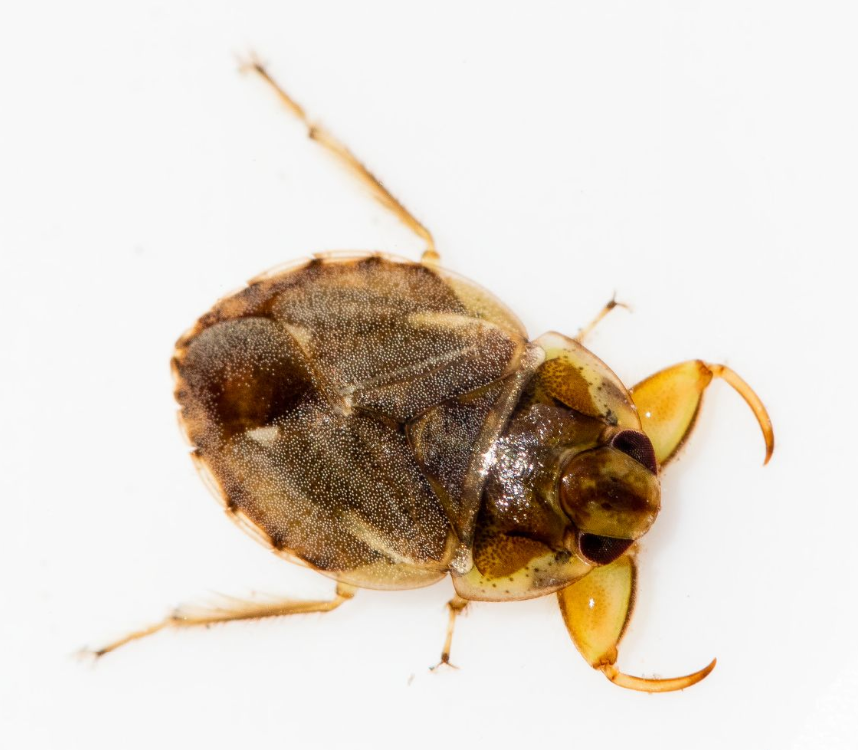

Conservation status
- Critically Imperiled (NatureServe)

Scientific classification
- Kingdom: Animalia
- Phylum: Arthropoda
- Clade: Pancrustacea
- Class: Insecta
- Order: Hemiptera
- Suborder: Heteroptera
- Family: Naucoridae
- Genus: Ambrysus
- Species: A. amargosus

Binomial name
- Ambrysus amargosus La Rivers, 1953

= Ambrysus amargosus =

Species of true bug

Ambrysus amargosus, the Ash Meadows naucorid, is a small insect of the Naucoridae family. They were first identified by Ira La Rivers in 1953. They live in the waters of Point of Rocks Springs, in the east-central region of Ash Meadows National Wildlife Refuge in Nye County, Nevada. Because of changes to their habitat, this species lives only in a few small stream channels. Scientific over-collection and introduced predatory fish are the main threats to these insects. They are the first species to be listed as threatened under the Endangered Species Act (ESA). They are also currently protected under the Ash Meadows National Wildlife Refuge (NWR)

== Description ==
Ash Meadows naucorids are small aquatic insects, reaching about 6 mm in length. Information on species biology is very limited. In fact, the majority of the information is based on other naucorid bugs. This insect is generally a dull brown in color with various dark yellow markings over their body. Their front two legs are usually used for prey capture and they use their hind legs for swimming.8 The Ash Meadows naucorid is a flightless insect and spends its entire life cycle in the water. This aquatic insect is about 6 millimeters long. It does not fly. It lives in the Point of Rocks Springs at Ash Meadows, where it can be found in a few channels of flowing water measuring no more than 0.3 meters wide by 10 meters long.

== Life history ==
Very little information is known on the life history of the Ash Meadows naucorid. Their populations vary seasonally, with the highest numbers peaking in the summer. Reproduction occurs during early spring and summer. The females drop their eggs close to the gravel floors of the springs, where they stick to the pebbles.

== Ecology ==
=== Diet ===
The diet of the Ash Meadows naucorid is very similar to that of other naucorids. A diet consisting of aquatic insect larvae and plant matter. These are usually on the spring floors which make it easy for the naucorid to swim over and through the substrate and prey upon the larvae and plants.

=== Behavior ===
The Ash Meadows naucorid lives at the bottom of the hot springs, specifically underneath the rocky substrate.

=== Habitat ===
The habitat of the Ash Meadows naucorid is specific. The distribution suggests that the naucorid occupies the hot springs of the Ash Meadows National Refuge. The ideal habitat is small thermal springs with high flowing water and fine, gravel substrate laying at the floor. It was restricted to these trickles when the flowing spring water was channelized and impounded. Ten acres have been designated critical habitat for this insect.

=== Range ===
The Ash Meadows naucorid lives in the Ash Meadows National Wildlife Refuge located in Nye County, Nevada. They localize towards the hot springs in the refuge, more specifically the Point of Rocks Spring in the refuge.

== Conservation ==
=== Population size ===
Before 1983, the Ash Meadows naucorid spread throughout the Point of Rocks springs. Because of this wide range, the total population was much greater than today's at about 10,000. 10 From 1985 to 1997, due to habitat alterations, the population experienced a decline. There were only about 730 recorded individuals. However, surveys of wild populations from 1998 to 2008 documented an increase to 2,912. The current wild population is self-sustaining and continues to reproduce.

=== Past and current geographical distribution ===
Earlier populations of the Ash Meadows naucorid were spread throughout the entirety of the Point of Rocks Springs in the Ash Meadows National Refuge. Before 1983, the naucorids occupied any of the springs that held adequate water flow. However, as of September 2020, this insect can be found in only five low-flow spring brooks in the Point of Rocks region. It lives in a few channels in these brooks that measure no larger than 0.3 meters wide and 10 meters long. These five spring brooks, along with the remaining Point of Rocks Springs, are critical habitats for the naucorid. They make up approximately 10 acres of land. All the individuals in the spring brooks are part of a single population. This means that a single group of naucorids spread throughout the five spring brooks. The Ash Meadows NWR plans to expand the range of the naucorid to the entirety of the Point of Rocks springs. The goal of the NWR will be to continue to introduce the species to spring brooks. The ultimate goal is to establish self-sustaining populations.

=== Major threats ===
There are many reasons for the decline in population sizes for the naucorid. Out of all the factors, habitat loss due to human activity is the most significant reason. Agricultural and city development are leading causes of the destruction of land. Groundwater depletion, scientific over-collection, and introduction of non-native species also threaten the population. The Ash Meadows naucorid requires a specific habitat made of hot, high-flowing waters. The decrease of groundwater reservoirs leaves less water available to the hot springs. This means there is slower flowing water in the hot springs. As suggested earlier, the naucorid was victim to scientific over collection for experimentation. As of now, scientific over collection has decreased a lot. This has led to a change in the classification of the insect. Its status changed from "endangered" to “threatened”. Introduction of nonnative species is another cause of population decline. Nonnative fish and crayfish are the biggest predators of the Ash Meadows naucorid.

=== ESA listing ===
The listing of the Ash Meadows naucorid under the ESA has fluctuated throughout the years. Prior to 1983, the naucorid was unlisted. However, following October 13, 1983, the US Fish and Wildlife Service (USFWS) and ESA listed the species as endangered. Along with this, all the previously inhabited regions were designated as critical habitats. Following May 20, 1985, recovery efforts were implemented and populations increased. As a result, the Service changed the naucorids status to threatened. This species was the first insect to be listed as threatened under the ESA. Since then, the status of the naucorid has remained threatened.

=== 5-year review ===
The Ash Meadows naucorid is a small, aquatic insect endemic to the Point of Rock Springs of the Ash Meadows National Wildlife Refuge. Before 1983, it occupied any high-flowing, thermal spring brook in the region. Its population size fluctuates depending on the season, with highs in the summer and lows in the winter. It is thought to have reached up to 10,000 individuals at some point. Following 1983, the region was subject to much alteration due to human activity. As a result, the native population of naucorids became restricted to only 5 low-flow spring brooks, measuring no more than 0.3 meters wide by 10 meters long each. As a result, the population size depleted to around 2,900. The current population is self-sustaining and continuously reproduces. Current status of the naucorid remains threatened. Efforts to introduce new populations to previously inhabited spring brooks are being made by the Ash Meadows NWR.

=== Species status assessment ===
Not available at this point.

=== Recovery plan ===
The Ash Meadows naucorid is currently protected by USFWS. These efforts are currently underway. Much of these work towards habitat restoration. These include, but are not limited to, reclamation of hot springs in the Point of Rocks Springs, removal of invasive aquatic species, and the management of water flows in the springs. The goal of these projects is to restore the endemic species to a wider range in the Point of Rocks Springs. Following these efforts, the species will be introduced into the thermal springs. The ultimate goal of these efforts is to establish self-sustaining populations.
