= Ash Meadows National Wildlife Refuge =

Protected area in the Amargosa Valley of southern Nye County, Nevada

- IUCN category IV (habitat/species management area)
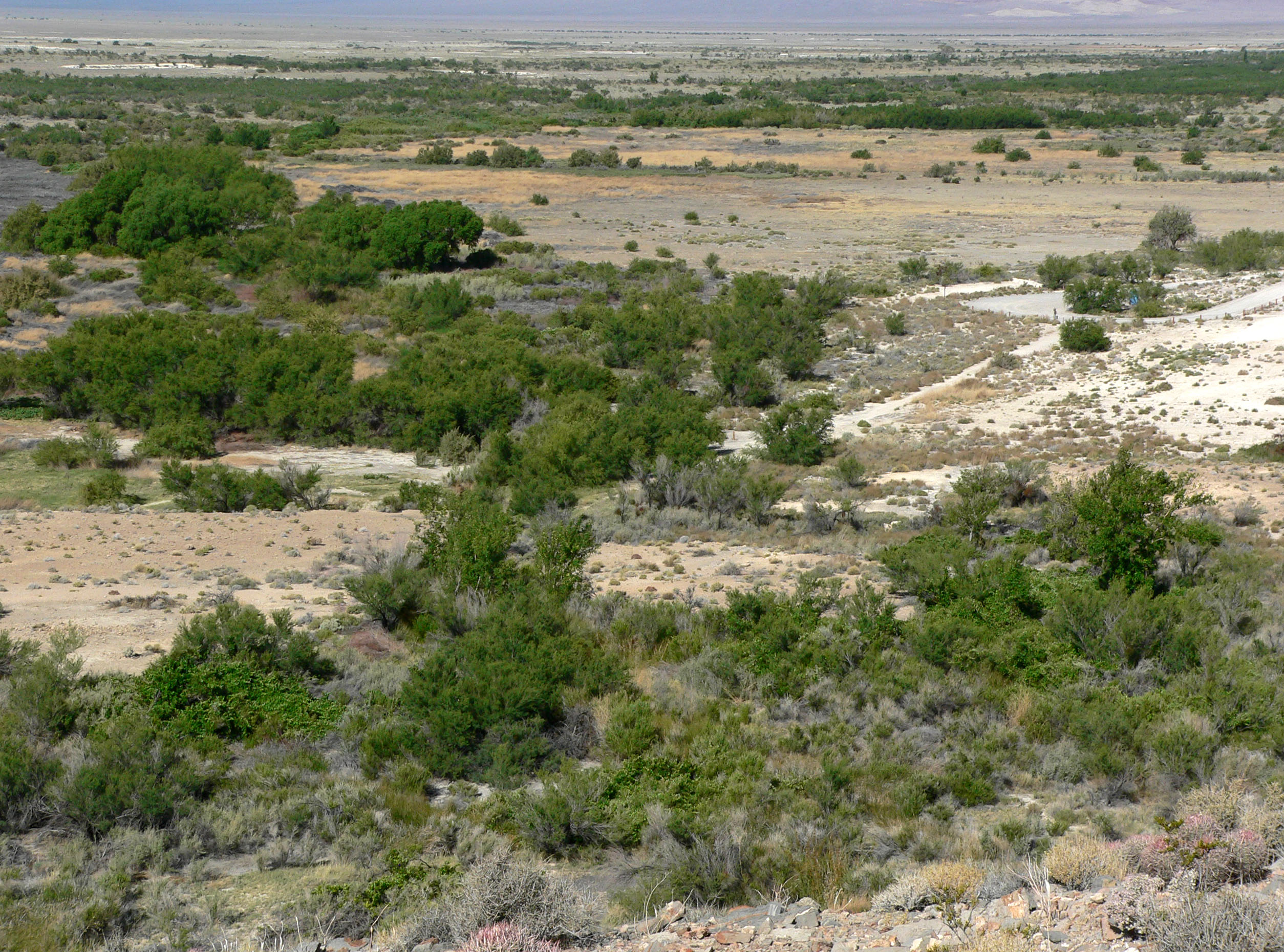
- Ash Meadows habitat, in the Amargosa Desert.

- Location within the United States
- Location: Nye County, Nevada, United States
- Nearest city: Pahrump, Nevada
- Coordinates: 36°25′30″N 116°20′00″W
- Area: 23,000 acres (93 km^{2})
- Established: 1984
- Governing body: U.S. Fish and Wildlife Service
- Website: Ash Meadows National Wildlife Refuge

Ramsar Wetland
- Designated: 18 December 1986
- Reference no.: 347

The Ash Meadows National Wildlife Refuge is a protected wildlife refuge located in the Amargosa Valley of southern Nye County, in southwestern Nevada. It is directly east of Death Valley National Park, and is 90 mi (140 km) west-northwest of Las Vegas.

In 1983 The Nature Conservancy purchased 12,613 acres that had been slated for development to protect Ash Meadows. The Nature Conservancy transferred the land to the Fish and Wildlife Service and the refuge was created on June 18, 1984, to protect this extremely rare desert oasis in the Mojave Desert.

Ash Meadows is administered by the U.S. Fish and Wildlife Service.

== Geography ==
The 23,000-acre (9,300 ha) Ash Meadows National Wildlife Refuge is part of the larger Desert National Wildlife Refuge Complex, which also includes the Desert National Wildlife Refuge, the Moapa Valley National Wildlife Refuge, and the Pahranagat National Wildlife Refuge. Inside Ash Meadows is Devils Hole, a detached unit of Death Valley National Park.

Ash Meadows is within the Amargosa Desert, of the Mojave Desert ecoregion. The Amargosa River is a visible part of the valley hydrology, and has seasonal surface flow passing southwards adjacent to the preserve, to later enter Death Valley.

== Natural history ==
Ash Meadows contains desert oases, a habitat type that is uncommon in the southwestern deserts. The refuge is a major discharge point for an underground aquifer system extending more than 100 mi (160 km) to the northeast. Water-bearing strata reach the surface through more than thirty seeps and springs, which support a variety of mesic habitats.

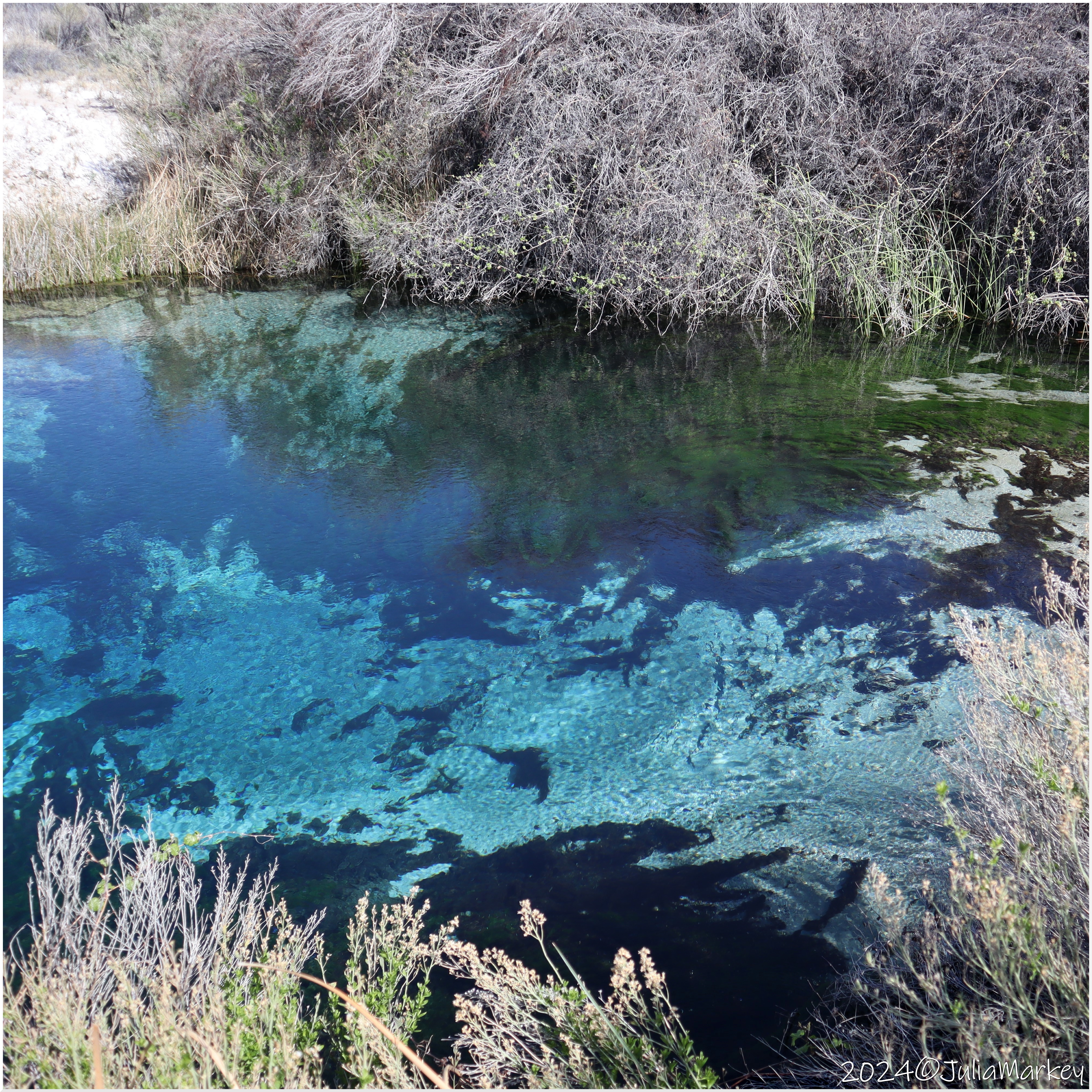
The Point of Rocks Springs in the Ash Meadows National Wildlife Refuge is home to the Amargosa River Pupfish.

Virtually all of the water at Ash Meadows is fossil water, believed to have entered the ground water system tens of thousands of years ago.

Numerous stream channels and wetlands are scattered throughout the refuge. To the north and west are the remnants of Carson Slough, which was drained and mined for its peat in the 1960s. Sand dunes occur in the western and southern parts of the refuge.

=== Endemic plants and animals ===
Ash Meadows National Wildlife Refuge was established to provide and protect habitat for at least twenty-six endemic plants and animals, meaning they are found nowhere else in the world.

The concentration of locally exclusive flora and fauna that distinguishes Ash Meadows is the greatest concentration of endemic biota in any local area within the United States. It has the second greatest local endemism concentration in all of North America.

==== Endemic flora ====
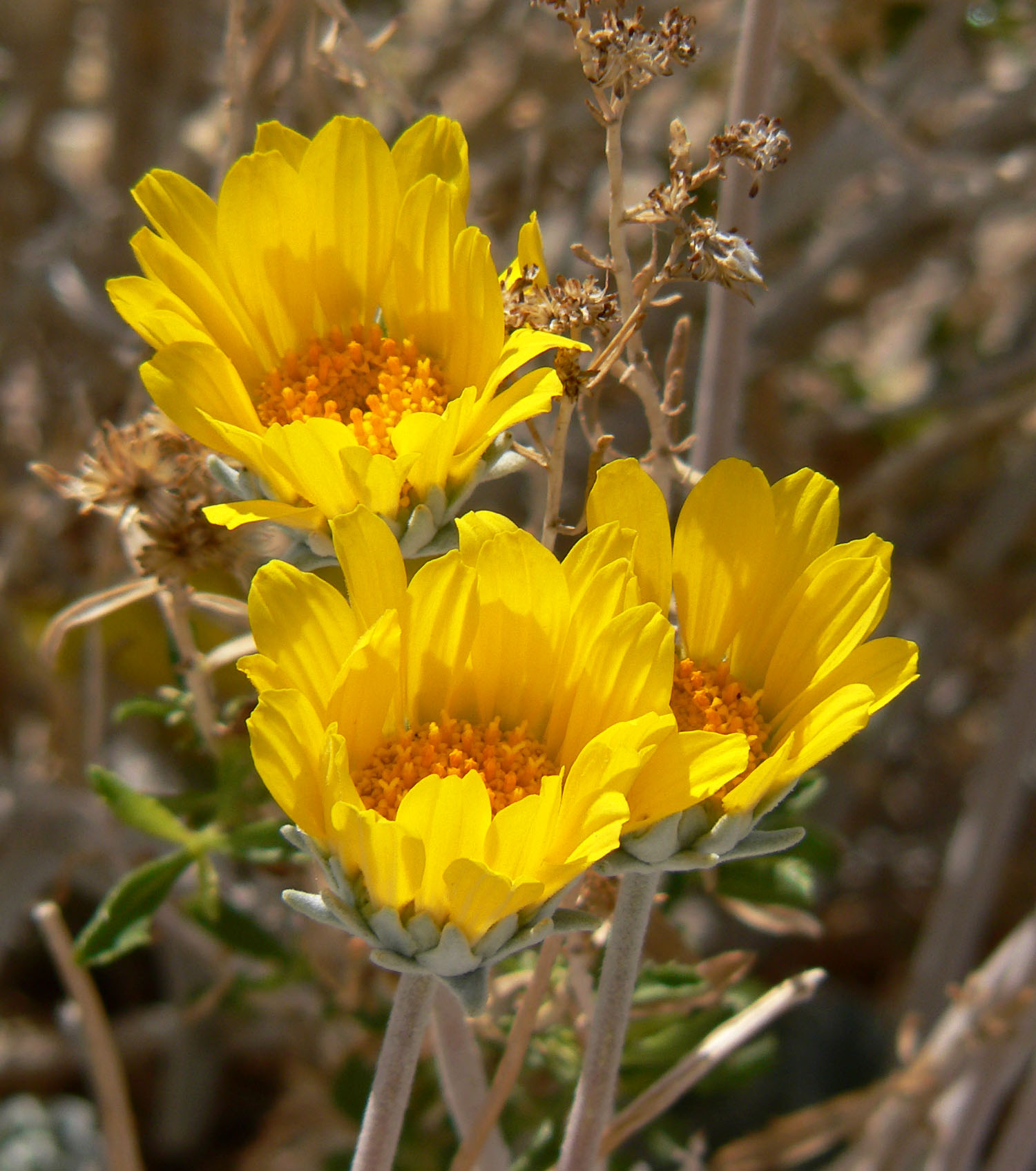
Enceliopsis nudicaulis (Ash Meadows sunray)

There are many plants endemic to Ash Meadows, including:

- Ash Meadows blazing star (Mentzelia leucophylla), Threatened
- Amargosa niterwort (Nitrophila mohavensis), Endangered
- Ash Meadows milk-vetch (Astragalus phoenix), Threatened
- Ash Meadows sunray (Enceliopsis nudicaulis var. corrugata), Threatened
- Ash Meadows gumplant (Grindelia fraxinopratensis), Threatened
- Ash Meadows ivesia (Ivesia kingii var. eremica), Threatened
- Ash Meadows lady's tresses (Spiranthes infernalis)
- Tecopa birdsbeak (Chloropyron tecopense)
- Spring-loving centaury (Zeltnera namophila), Threatened

==== Endemic fauna ====
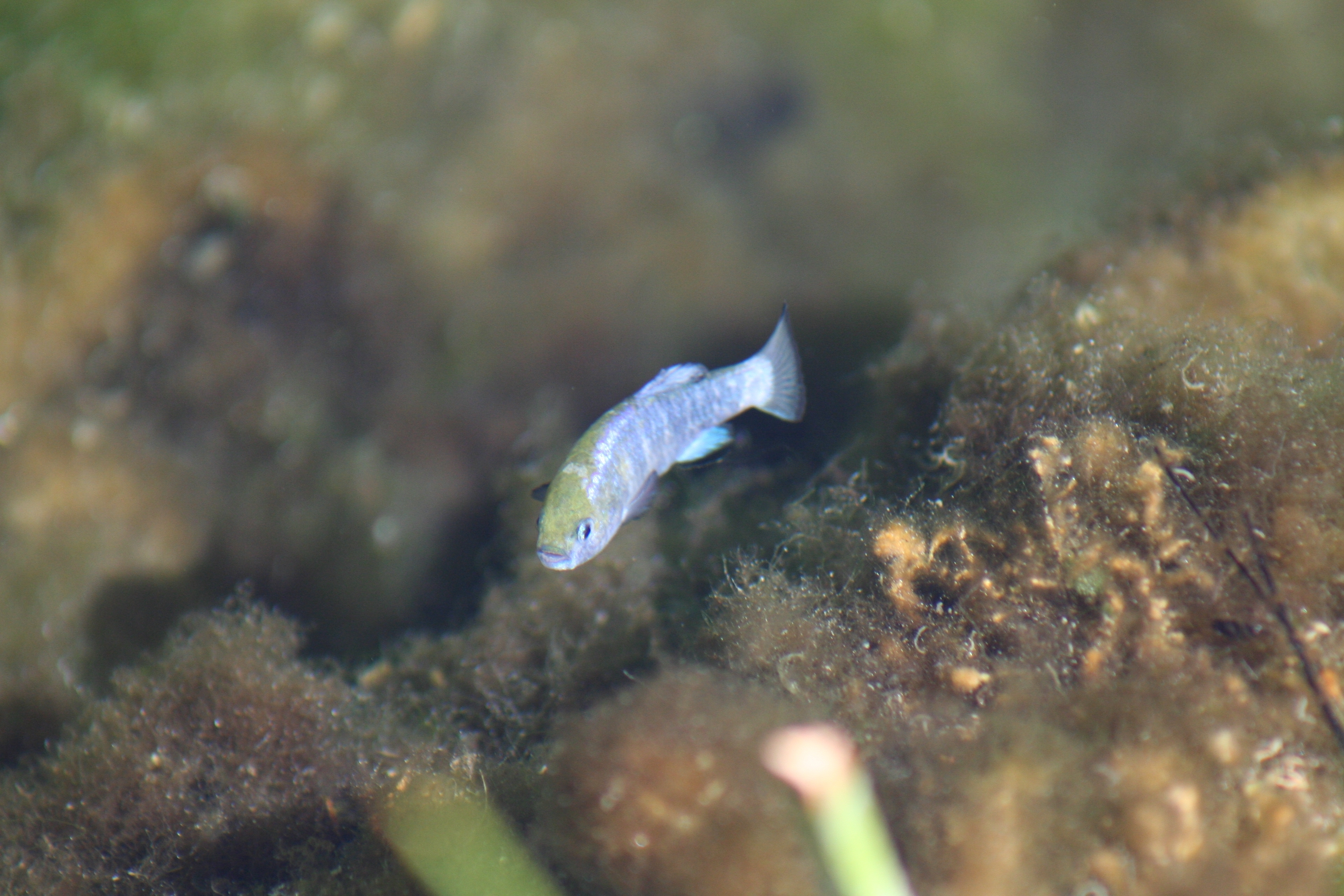
The endangered Amargosa pupfish in Kings Pool

There are also a large number of endemic invertebrates and fish in the refuge:

- Ash Meadows naucorid (Ambrysus amargosus) Threatened
- Warm Springs naucorid (Ambrysus relictus)
- Devils Hole warm spring riffle beetle (Stenelmis calida calida)
- Ash Meadows pebble snail (Pyrgulopsis erythropoma)
- Crystal springs snail (Pyrgulopsis crystalis)
- Distal-gland springsnail (Pyrgulopsis nanus)
- Elongate gland springsnail (Pyrgulopsis isolatus)
- Fairbanks Spring snail (Pyrgulopsis fairbanksinsis)
- Median-gland Nevada spring snail (Pyrgulopsis pisteri)
- Amargosa tryonia (Tryonia variegata)
- Minute tryonia (Tryonia erica)
- Point of Rocks tryonia (Tryonia elata)
- Sportinggoods tryonia (Tryonia angulata)
- Devils Hole pupfish (Cyprinodon diabolis), Endangered
- Warm Springs pupfish (Cyprinodon nevadensis pectoralis), Endangered
- Ash Meadows Amargosa pupfish (Cyprinodon nevadensis mionectes), Endangered
- Ash Meadows speckled dace (Rhinichthys osculus nevadensis), Endangered

==== Discoveries ====
In 2010, Utah State University announced that a team from the school had discovered two new bee species in the genus Perdita at Ash Meadows.
