= Muddy River (Nevada) =

River in Clark County, Nevada, United States

Coordinates: 36°44′15″N 114°44′39″W

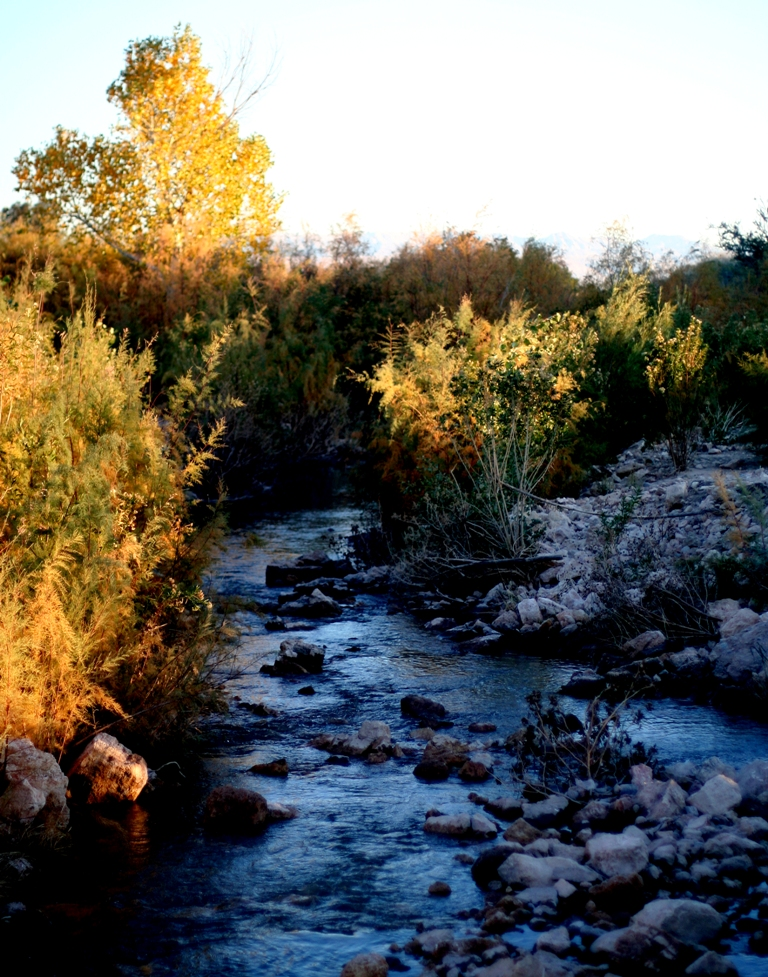
Muddy River in late Fall, looking south

The Muddy River, formerly known as the Moapa River, is a short river located in Clark County, in southern Nevada, United States. It is in the Mojave Desert, approximately 60 miles (97 km) north of Las Vegas.

== Geography ==
The Muddy River is approximately 32 miles (51 km) long. It begins as a series of thermal springs in the Moapa Valley before continuing on its course to Lake Mead, where it drains into the northern arm of the lake near Overton, Nevada. Before the Hoover Dam's construction, the Muddy River flowed into the Virgin River. As of 2026 the point where the Muddy River connects to the Virgin River is Visible. The Virgin River connects with the Lake 1.5 miles down stream. This is due to Drought Conditions throughout the Colorado River Basin and visible on Satellite imagery.

Near the town of Glendale the Muddy River collects the flow from the Meadow Valley Wash, forming the principal drainage system for southeastern Nevada.

== Moapa National Wildlife Refuge ==
The Moapa Valley area is home to a wide variety of rare and endangered species, including fish, invertebrates, birds, and plants. Three endangered fish inhabit the area: the Moapa dace (Moapa coriacea), the Virgin River chub (Gila seminuda), and the White River springfish (Crenichthys baileyi moapae). These species can be found throughout the various springs, called the Muddy Springs, that feed the Muddy River.

The U.S. Fish and Wildlife Service has created the Moapa National Wildlife Refuge at the Warm Springs Natural Area, as part of the Desert National Wildlife Refuge Complex. In another effort to help protect and preserve the fragile habitats in the Muddy Springs area, the Southern Nevada Water Authority (SNWA) and various environmental associations have organized an effort to conserve these species.

== History ==
The area was part of the Native American Paiute peoples homeland for centuries, with the Mojave to the south. "Moapa" is a Southern Paiute language word meaning "muddy"; although "Moapa River" was formerly the official name, local usage tended to translate the name, and it was made official in 1960.

The Old Spanish Trail originally followed the Virgin River all the way to the Colorado River and followed it westward. In 1844, the expedition of John C. Frémont discovered a cutoff route that avoided the Colorado River, following a route between Resting Springs in California, and the Virgin River Valley that passed through Las Vegas Springs and crossed the Muddy River near modern Glendale. Mormon pioneers blazed a wagon road from Salt Lake City to Los Angeles along this pack trail in 1847, followed by Forty-niners attempting to avoid the winter snows of the Sierra Nevada Mountains, and wagon trains of Mormon colonists on their way to settle in San Bernardino in 1852. By 1855 it had become a cold season freight route between Utah and Southern California that remained in use in Southern Nevada into the 20th century.

Mormon settlers established several settlements in the Muddy River area in 1864, including the town of St. Thomas, which by 1938 was submerged under Lake Mead until recently. Some of the towns ruins can be still seen during low water levels. Some Paiutes fought to protect and reclaim their homeland. For a variety of reasons, including the harsh climate, unpredictable periods of drought, and a tax dispute with the State of Nevada, the Mormons abandoned the area in 1871. Many of the LDS people returned to the area in the 1880s and it currently has a substantial LDS population

== See also ==
- List of rivers of Nevada
- Mormon Corridor
- Category: Desert National Wildlife Refuge Complex
