= Ozark Cavefish National Wildlife Refuge =

Protected area in Missouri, United States

- Location within the United States
- Location: Lawrence County, Missouri, United States
- Nearest city: Springfield, MO
- Coordinates: 37°34′N 93°23′W
- Area: 40 acres (16 ha)
- Established: 1991
- Visitors: Closed to the public (in 2006)
- Governing body: U.S. Fish and Wildlife Service
- Website: Ozark Cavefish National Wildlife Refuge

The Ozark Cavefish National Wildlife Refuge is a 40-acre (16-ha) National Wildlife Refuge located in Lawrence County, Missouri, 20 mi (32 km) west of Springfield. The United States Fish and Wildlife Service acquired the land in 1991 to protect the endangered Ozark cavefish.

== Wildlife and protected species ==
In addition to the Ozark cavefish, Turnback Cave provides habitat for the endangered gray bat, whose droppings provide the essential nutrient source for the caves. The refuge is closed to the public.

== See also ==
- Mingo National Wildlife Refuge
