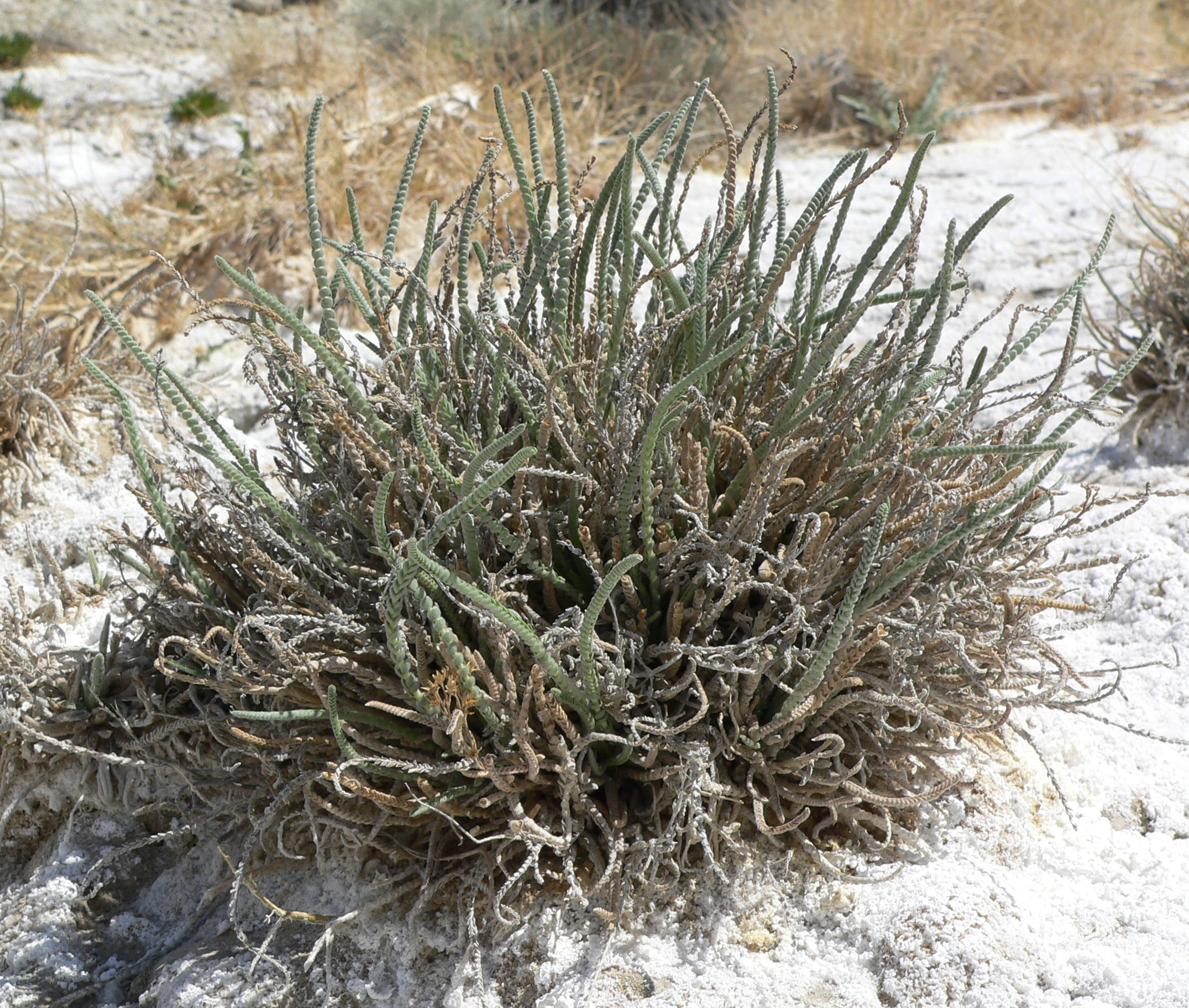
- P. k. var. eremica

Conservation status
- Vulnerable (NatureServe)

Scientific classification
- Kingdom: Plantae
- Clade: Tracheophytes
- Clade: Angiosperms
- Clade: Eudicots
- Clade: Rosids
- Order: Rosales
- Family: Rosaceae
- Genus: Potentilla
- Species: P. kingii

Binomial name
- Potentilla kingii (S.Watson) Greene

Synonyms
- Horkelia kingii (S.Watson) Rydb.; Ivesia kingii S.Watson

= Potentilla kingii =

Species of flowering plant

Potentilla kingii, also known as King's mousetail, is a species of flowering plant in the rose family.

It is native to the southwestern United States, where it is known from eastern California, Nevada, and Utah.

== Varieties ==
- Ivesia kingii var. kingii, the King's Mousetail, or the King's ivesia, is known from California, Nevada, and Utah.
- Ivesia kingii var. eremica, the Ash Meadows Mousetail, or the Ash Meadows ivesia, is endemic to Ash Meadows in the Amargosa Desert, in Nye County, Nevada, on the California-Nevada border. It is federally listed as a threatened species of the United States and is listed as a critically endangered and fully protected species by the State of Nevada.
