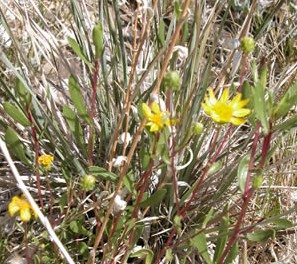

Conservation status
- Imperiled (NatureServe)

Scientific classification
- Kingdom: Plantae
- Clade: Tracheophytes
- Clade: Angiosperms
- Clade: Eudicots
- Clade: Asterids
- Order: Asterales
- Family: Asteraceae
- Genus: Grindelia
- Species: G. fraxinipratensis

Binomial name
- Grindelia fraxinipratensis Reveal & Beatley 1972

Synonyms
- Grindelia fraxino-pratensis Reveal & Beatley

= Grindelia fraxinipratensis =

Species of flowering plant

Grindelia fraxinipratensis, common name Ash Meadows gumweed, is a North American species of flowering plants in the family Asteraceae. It is native to the southwestern United States, in Mojave Desert regions in Nye County in Nevada and Inyo County in California. Some of the Nevada populations (including the type locality) lie inside the Nevada Test Site of the United States Atomic Energy Commission

Some sources spell the name as G. fraxino-pratensis. Grindelia fraxinipratensis is the accepted spelling according to the International Code of Nomenclature.

== Description ==
Grindelia fraxinipratensis grows in meadows and on the borders of woodlands. It is a biennial or perennial herb growing 50–120 cm (19.5–47 in) tall, erect in form, brown or reddish, and hairless and oily. It grows from a thick underground caudex atop a woody taproot. The dark green leaves are up to 7 centimeters (2.8 inches) long, widely lance-shaped or oblong, sometimes toothed near the tips, and studded with visible resin glands. The inflorescence bears one to four flower heads lined with thick phyllaries. The head contains about 15 yellow disc florets surrounded by about 13 yellow ray florets each about 4 millimeters (0.16 inches) long. The fruit is an achene with a pappus made up of two awns.

Grindelia fraxinipratensis is native to the Amargosa Valley along the southern part of the border between California and Nevada, where it is known from only 14 to 16 locations. Many are found within the Ash Meadows National Wildlife Refuge in the Amargosa Desert area.

The plant grows in the clay, saline and alkaline soils of the land surrounding desert warm springs in the valley. Its main habitat type is the saltgrass meadow (Distichlis spicata). It is relatively abundant in the moist areas of its habitat, and rare in the drier areas.

== Conservation ==
Grindelia fraxinipratensis is a federally listed threatened species and is listed as a critically endangered and fully protected species by the State of Nevada. Habitat in the area was first altered when peat mining was started and Carson Slough, a large local wetland, was drained. The area was then farmed. Large scale farming by corporate agriculture altered much of the Ash Meadows habitat. Today a main threat to the species is the lowering of the water table, which may move water supplies too deep into the soil for the plant to reach with its roots. Other threats include trampling by feral horses and cattle, off-road vehicle use, and non-native plant species.
