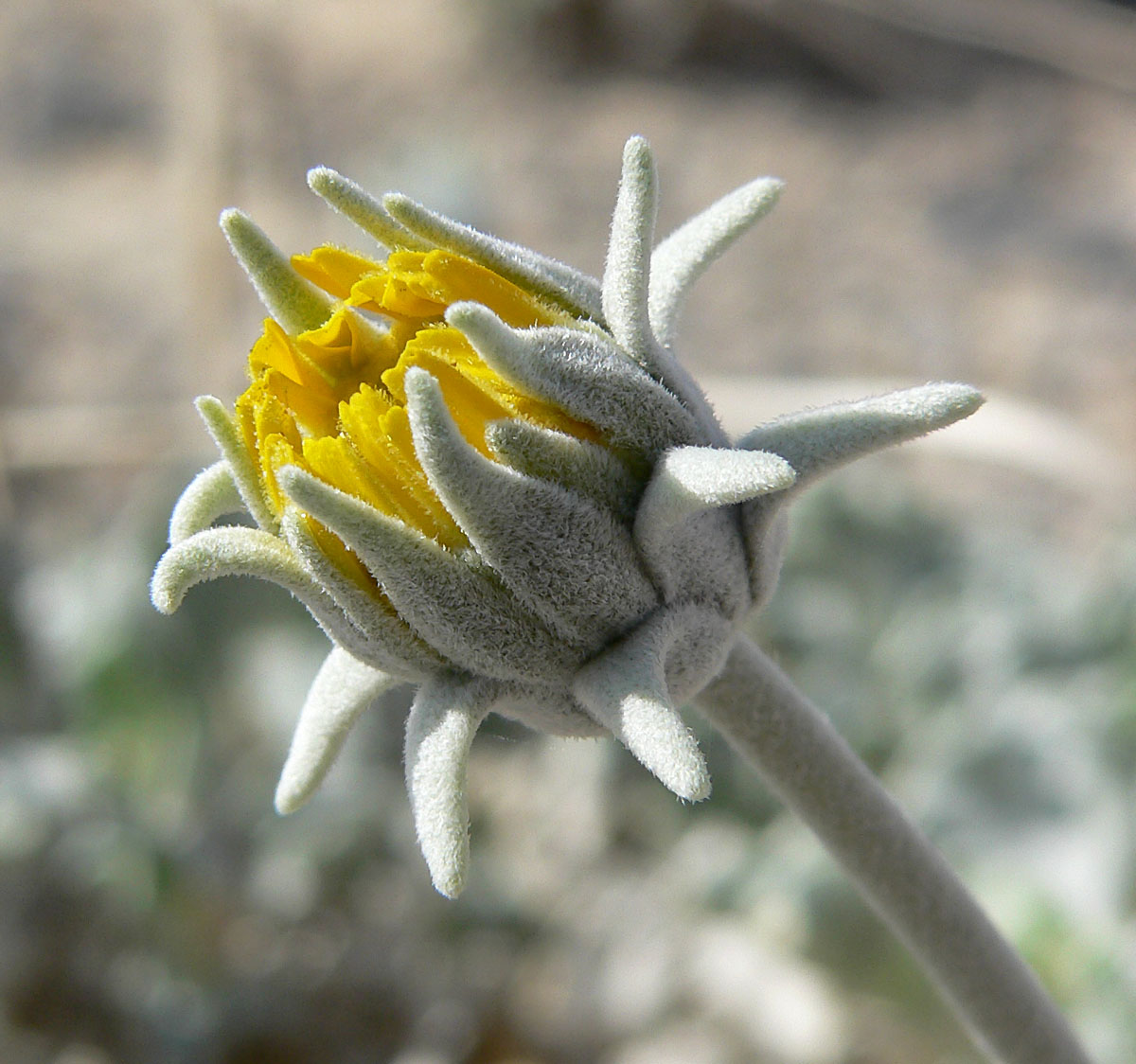
- Enceliopsis nudicaulis var. corrugata

Scientific classification
- Kingdom: Plantae
- Clade: Tracheophytes
- Clade: Angiosperms
- Clade: Eudicots
- Clade: Asterids
- Order: Asterales
- Family: Asteraceae
- Tribe: Heliantheae
- Genus: Enceliopsis
- Species: E. nudicaulis

Binomial name
- Enceliopsis nudicaulis (A.Gray) A.Nelson

Synonyms
- Encelia nudicaulis A.Gray; Enceliopsis tuta A.Nelson; Helianthella nudicaulis (A.Gray) A.Gray

= Enceliopsis nudicaulis =

Species of flowering plant

Enceliopsis nudicaulis is a North American species of flowering plants in the family Asteraceae known by the common name nakedstem sunray, or naked-stemmed daisy.

== Description ==
E. nudicaulis is a perennial herb growing up to 45 centimeters (18 inches) tall from a woody caudex fringed with gray-green hairy leaves. The leaves are oval and up to 6.5 cm (2 1/2 in) long and wide.

Blooming from May to August, the inflorescence is a solitary flower head atop a tall, erect peduncle. The flower head is 7.5–10 cm (3–4 in); it has a base made up of three layers of densely woolly, pointed phyllaries. It has a fringe of approximately 21 yellow ray florets each 2 to 4 cm (3/4 to 1 1/2 in) long. The fruit is a hairy achene about 1 cm in length.

== Varieties ==
There are two recognized varieties of this species:

- Enceliopsis nudicaulis var. corrugata, the Ash Meadows sunray – the rarer variety, which is probably endemic to Nevada in the vicinity of Ash Meadows in the Amargosa Desert. It is federally listed as threatened and is listed as a critically endangered and fully protected species by the State of Nevada.
- Enceliopsis nudicaulis var. nudicaulis – found in most of species range

== Distribution and habitat ==
Enceliopsis nudicaulis is native to the western United States: Idaho, Colorado, Utah, Nevada, Arizona, and California including the Inyo Mountains–White Mountains and sky islands the Mojave Desert in California. It grows in desert, plateau, and montane habitats.

== Uses ==
It is sometimes used as an ornamental plant in dry areas.
