= Janice C. Beatley =

American botanist

Janice Carson Beatley
- Photograph of Janice Beatley
- Born: 18 March 1919; Columbus, Ohio, United States
- Died: 14 November 1987 (aged 68)
- Education: Ohio State University BA 1940 MS 1948 PhD 1953
- Known for: Botanical research at NNSS
- Scientific career
- Fields: Botany
- Thesis: The primary forests of Vinton and Jackson counties, Ohio (1953)
- Author abbrev. (botany): Beatley

Janice Carson Beatley (March 18, 1919 – November 14, 1987) was an American botanist, known for her fieldwork on the forests of Ohio and the flora of the Nevada Atomic Test Site. Beatley was Professor of Biological Sciences at the University of Cincinnati. She has three plant species named in her honour including Astragalus beatleyae.

== Early life and education ==
Janice Carson Beatley was born in Columbus, Ohio to Earle Beatley and Alice Elizabeth (Carson) Beatley. In 1935, she graduated from North High School in Columbus, then went on to obtain three degrees from Ohio State University, a B.A. in zoology (1940), and a M.S. (1948) and a PhD (1953), both in botany with research in plant ecology.

== Career ==
During her early career, Beatley conducted extensive studies of the forests of central and southern Ohio, including a survey of more than 1000 species of wintergreen herbaceous flora. This work, published as "The winter-green herbaceous flowering plants of Ohio" (1956), is believed to be the first comprehensive study of its kind in North America. Other extensive studies of Ohio vegetation followed, but in 1960, Beatley's focus shifted to the Atomic Test Site of south-central Nevada, where she would work for the next 13 years. Her studies there included identification and mapping of native and non-native plant species, as well as the effects of environmental factors, such as precipitation and radioactive dust, on the local flora. Later, she would return to Ohio, but continue her research in Nevada. Over the course of her career, Beatley undertook academic and research positions for several institutions, including: University of Tennessee, East Carolina College, North Carolina State University and New Mexico Highlands University. Over the course of her career, she collected over 10,000 herbarium specimens, which are deposited in herbarium collections across the US.

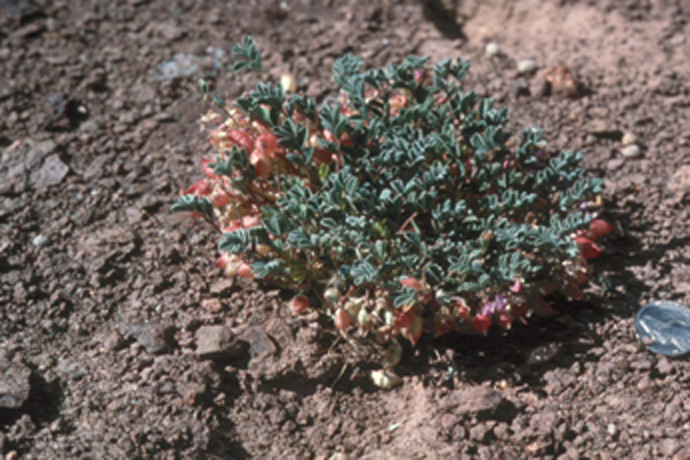
Astragalus beatleyae is named for her

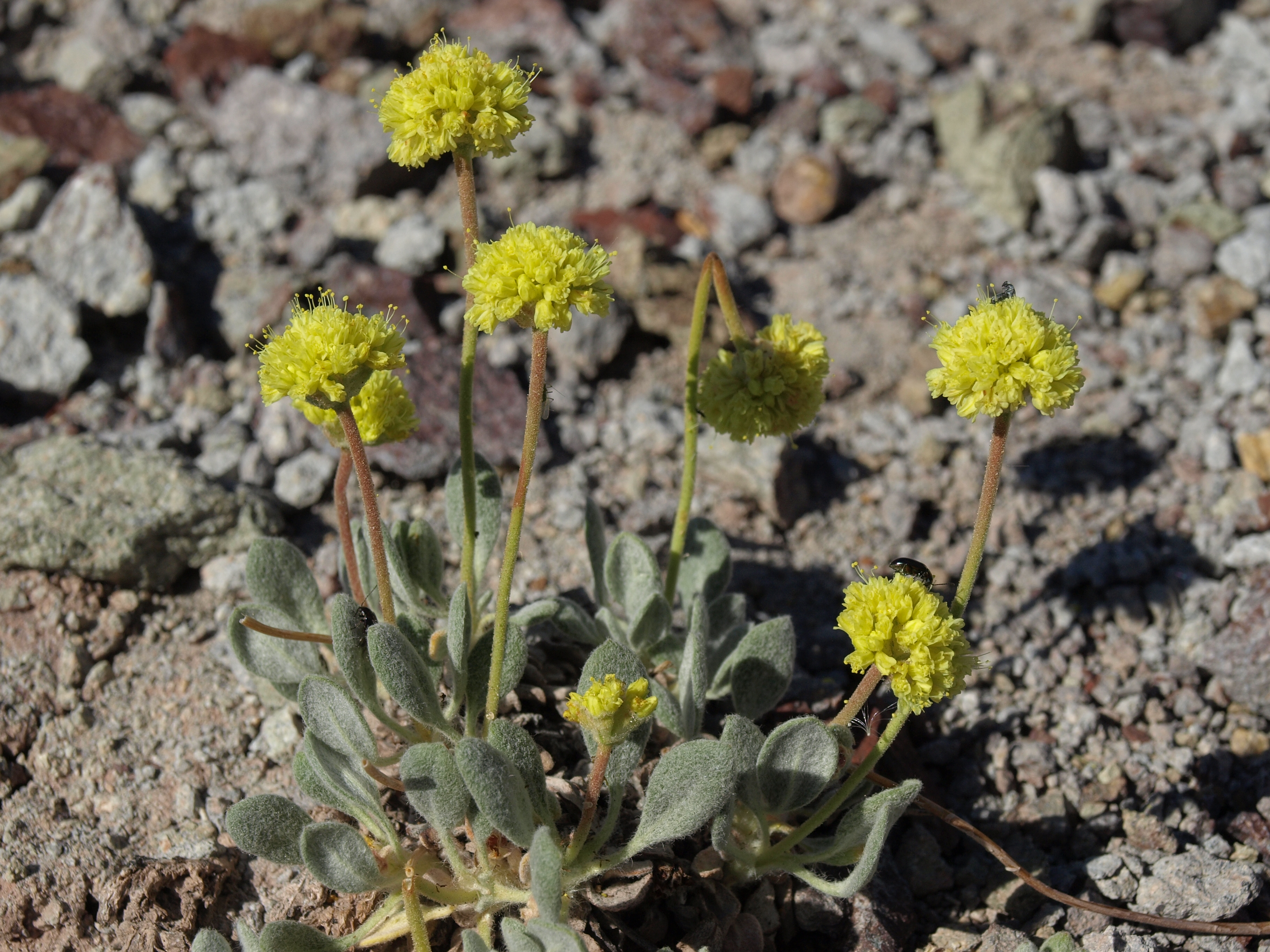
Beatley buckwheat, Eriogonum rosense var. beatleyae

From 1960 to 1973 she was a research ecologist at the University of California, Los Angeles and the Nevada Test Site at Mercury, Nevada. She moved on to become a professor of Biological Sciences at the University of Cincinnati from 1973 to 1987. She was also a research associate at the Herbarium of the Ohio State University (1983-1987).

Her work at the Nevada test site began in 1962 when she created 68 study sites. The intention had been to study the effect of radiation on the plants, but this plan had to be changed when the United States abandoned atmospheric testing of nuclear weapons in 1963. The sites however became important because they recorded change. She published reports up to 1980 but much of her data was never published but it was all transferred to the USGS after she died. It was "an ideal place to conduct long-term ecosystem research".

Beatley was a member of many professional scientific bodies, as well as an active supporter of several environmental protection organizations. Three plant species are named for her: Astragalus beatleyae Barneby, Eriogonum beatleyae Reveal, and Phacelia beatleyae Reveal and Constance. Beatley died of pneumonia on November 14, 1987. In the years following, the Janice Carson Beatley Herbarium Fund was created in her honor at The Ohio State University.

== Publications ==
A selection of the most widely held works by Beatley:

Notable Publications
Year	Title	City	Publisher
1953	The primary forests of Vinton and Jackson counties, Ohio	Columbus, OH	Ohio State University (Doctoral dissertation)
1959	The primeval forests of a periglacial area in the Allegheny Plateau (Vinton and Jackson Counties, Ohio)	Columbus, OH	Ohio State University
1962	Vascular plants of the U.S. Atomic Energy Commission's Nevada Test Site, Nye County, Nevada	Washington, DC	Office of Technical Services, Dept. of Commerce
1965	Ecology of the Nevada Test Site	Los Angeles, CA	UCLA Laboratory of Nuclear Medicine and Radiation Biology
1969	Vascular plants of the Nevada test site, Nellis Air Force Range, and Ash Meadows. (Northern Mojave and Southern Great Basin Deserts, South-central Nevada)	Los Angeles, CA	Place of publication not identified
1971	Vascular plants of Ash Meadows, Nevada	Los Angeles, CA	University of California, Laboratory of Nuclear Medicine and Radiation Biology; Atomic Energy Commission
1971	Ecologic and geographic distributions of the vascular plants of Southern Nye county, and adjacent part of Clark, Lincoln, and Esmeralda counties, Nevada	Los Angeles, CA	Place of publication not identified
1973	Check list of vascular plants of the Nevada test site and central-southern Nevada	Cincinnati, OH	Dept. of Biological Sciences, University of Cincinnati
1976	Vascular plants of the Nevada test site and central-southern Nevada: ecologic and geographic distributions	Oak Ridge, TN	Technical Information Center, Office of Technical Information, Energy Research and Development Administration
1977	Threatened plant species of the Nevada Test Site, Ash Meadows, and Central-Southern Nevada	Cincinnati, OH	Dept. of Biological Sciences, University of Cincinnati
1977	Endangered plant species of the Nevada Test Site, Ash Mountain, and Central-Southern Nevada	Cincinnati, OH	Dept. of Biological Sciences, University of Cincinnati
1979	Shrub and tree data for plant associations across the Mojave/Great Basin Desert transition of the Nevada Test Site, 1963-1975	Washington, DC	U.S. Dept. of Energy

Beatley also conducted research on the sunflowers of Tennessee and the buckeyes of Ohio, among others.
