= Moapa Valley National Wildlife Refuge =

Protected area in Nevada, United States

- IUCN category IV (habitat/species management area)
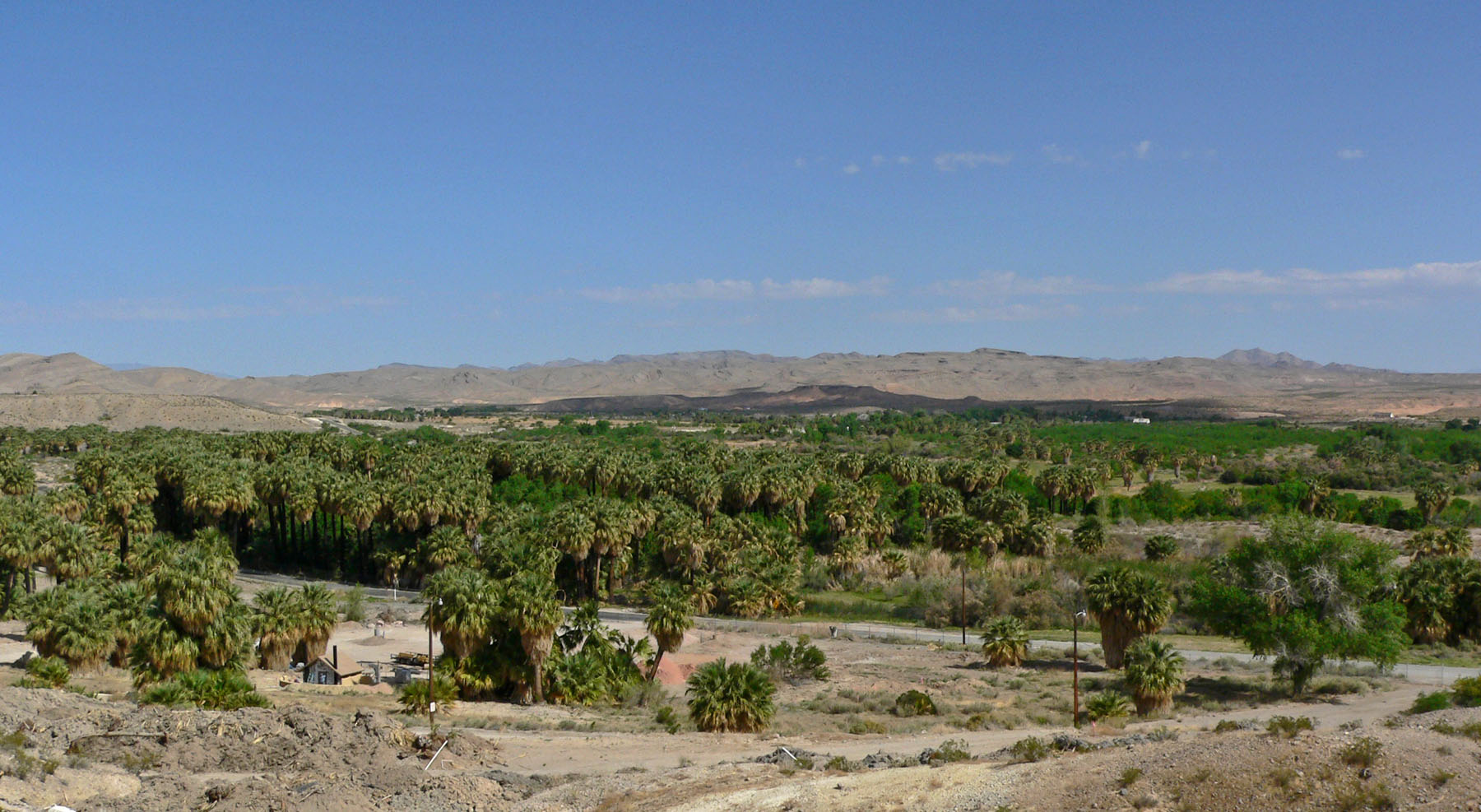
- View of the Moapa Valley Wildlife Refuge, looking north

- Location within the United States
- Location: Clark County, Nevada, United States
- Nearest city: Glendale, Nevada
- Coordinates: 36°42′30″N 114°42′48″W
- Area: 106 acres (43 ha)
- Established: 1979
- Governing body: U.S. Fish and Wildlife Service
- Website: Moapa Valley National Wildlife Refuge

The Moapa Valley National Wildlife Refuge (MVNWR) is a protected wildlife refuge administered by the U.S. Fish and Wildlife Service, located in the Warm Springs Natural Area in the Moapa Valley of Clark County, Nevada. The refuge is east of Death Valley and 60 miles (97 km) northeast of Las Vegas, Nevada.

The 106-acre (43 ha) refuge was created as part of the larger Desert National Wildlife Refuge Complex, on September 10, 1979. The Desert National Wildlife Refuge complex also includes the Ash Meadows National Wildlife Refuge, the Desert National Wildlife Refuge, and the Pahranagat National Wildlife Refuge.

== History ==
One of the areas of the MVNWR, now called the "Plummer Unit", was a public, family-owned recreational park. A former general manager of the Aladdin Hotel in Las Vegas, Bob Plummer, purchased a 100-acre (40 ha) parcel of land with an oasis of California Fan Palms (Washingtonia filifera) and natural hot springs. It became known as "Desert Oasis Warm Springs". During the 1970s and 80's he converted the property into a spa, resort and retreat enjoyed for over several decades by Las Vegas area families, with fond memories at the "Jewel in the Desert". By 1990 the resort changed from an open-to-the-public venue into a private time-share spa.

The Desert Oasis Warm Springs Resort continued to operate until a wildfire swept through the area in 1994. After the fire, the resort remained unused until 1997 when the property was purchased by Del Webb Inc., turned over to the Fish and Wildlife Service, and incorporated as part of the Moapa Valley National Wildlife Refuge.

== Moapa dace fish ==
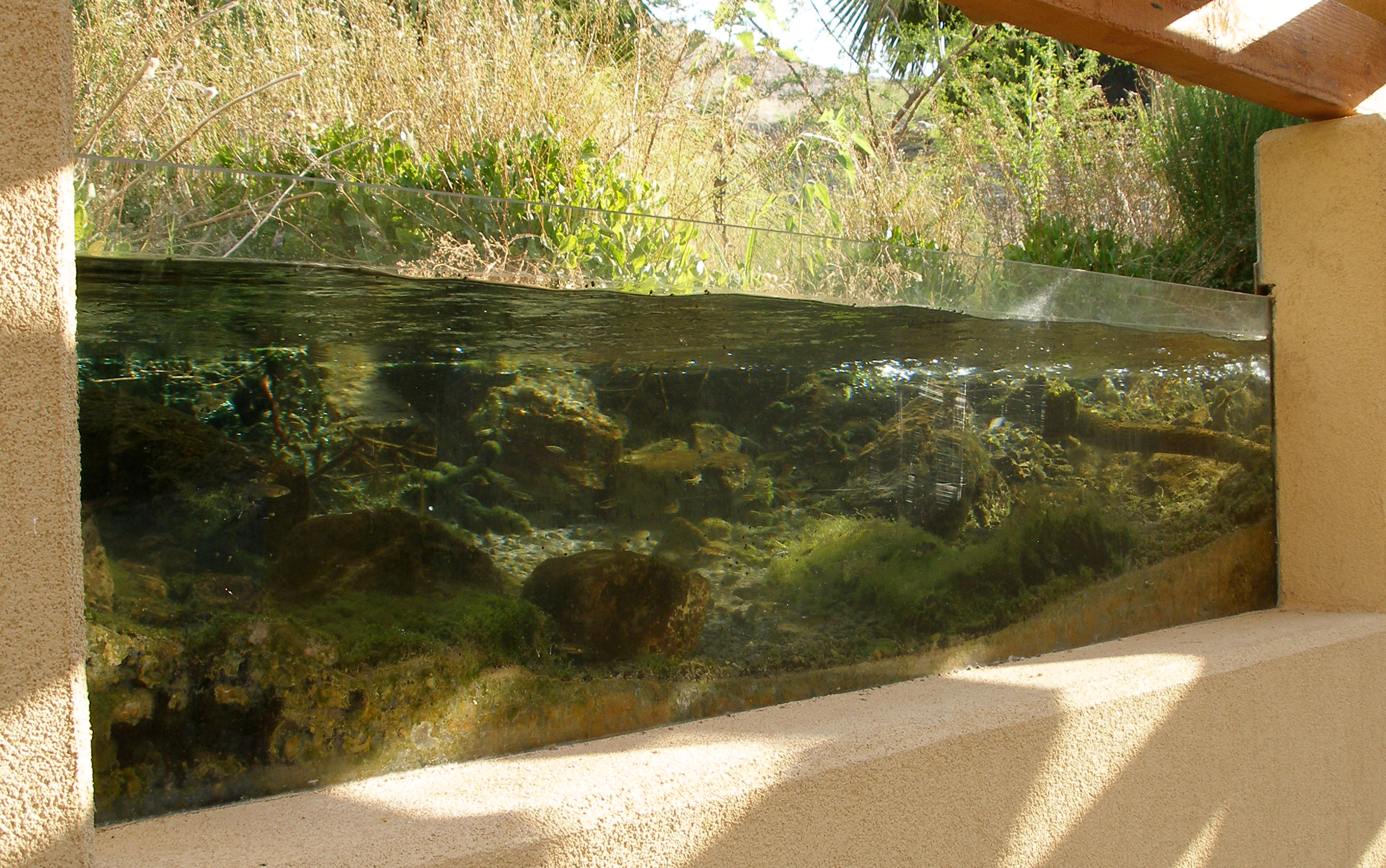
The viewing chamber at the Moapa Valley NWR provides an underwater view of endangered Moapa dace in their natural habitat.

The refuge was established to provide and protect the habitat of the endangered species of Moapa dace of which about 1,900 exist in the Muddy River area. The habitat on the refuge consists of stream channels feeding the Muddy River including six hot springs emerging near the center of the refuge.

Since the 1990s the dace have been in decline mainly due to habitat destruction and modification. Nearby groundwater pumping has decreased stream discharge and streamflows and decreased dace habitat. Competition with introduced species such as the mosquitofish and shortfin molly have also added to the dace's decline.

In August, 2005 the National Wildlife Refuge Association and again in September, 2005 the Defenders of Wildlife listed the Refuge as one of the 10 most endangered refuges in the United States.
