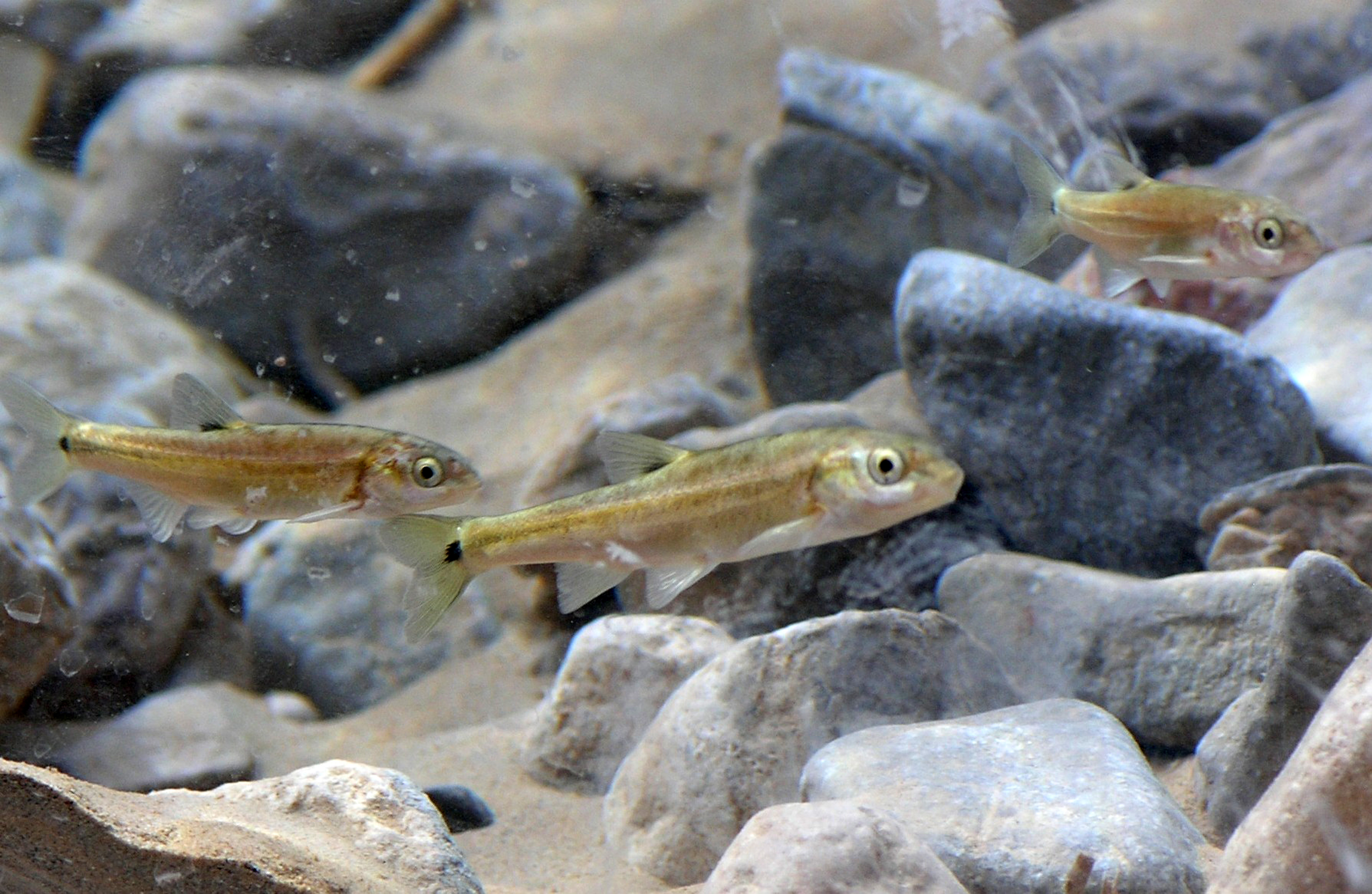

Conservation status
- Critically Endangered (IUCN 3.1)

- Critically Imperiled (NatureServe)

Scientific classification
- Kingdom: Animalia
- Phylum: Chordata
- Class: Actinopterygii
- Order: Cypriniformes
- Family: Leuciscidae
- Subfamily: Laviniinae
- Genus: Gila
- Species: G. coriacea

Binomial name
- Gila coriacea (C. L. Hubbs and R. R. Miller, 1948)

Synonyms
- Moapa coriacea C. L. Hubbs & R. R. Miller, 1948

= Moapa dace =

Species of fish

The moapa dace (Gila coriacea) is a species of freshwater ray-finned fish belonging to the family Leuciscidae, which includes the daces, chubs, Eurasian minnows and related species. This is a rare fish found in southern Nevada, United States, found only in the upper parts of the Muddy (formerly Moapa) River, and in the warm springs that give rise to the river.

A small fish, with a maximum recorded length of 9 cm (3.5 in), its scales are small and embedded in the skin, resulting in a noticeably leathery texture (thus the species epithet, derived from Latin coriaceus "leathery"). General body shape is standard for daces, with a vaguely conical head.

Moapa dace require warm water, and can survive in a temperature range of 67 to 93 °F (19 to 34 °C). They inhabit waters with abundant algae and shade over gravel, sand and mud, and have an omnivorous diet. Their reproduction cycle peaks in spring and is the lowest in fall, occurring in headwater tributaries. Spawning occurs within 150 m (490 ft) of headwaters springs, in water temperatures of 30–32 °C (86–90 °F). The Moapa Dace usually reproduce in areas where there are overhead instream cover and the water velocity is around 0.11 to 0.17 metres per second (0.36 to 0.56 ft/s). The entire habitat of this species consists of less than 10 square kilometres (3.9 sq mi) within Clark County, Nevada.

Moapa dace were federally listed as endangered in 1967. The International Union for Conservation of Nature assessed them as vulnerable in 1986 and 1988 on its Red List. In 1994, a fire at the Moapa National Wildlife Refuge triggered a population decline, and by 1996 the species had been classified as critically endangered. Additional threats to this species include loss of habitat due to resort development, the introduction of non-native fish species, and capping or depletion of spring-fed headwaters.

The Moapa National Wildlife Refuge was established solely to protect this species, and was the first National Wildlife Refuge created for the purpose of protecting an endangered fish species. Since then, researchers have created artificial streams mimicking the optimal conditions described above in hopes of spurring an increase in population. When analyzing the effects of stress on the fish, stressed fish experienced a high mortality rate of around 70% overall while the unstressed group of fish experienced around a 1.15% mortality rate per month.
