= Riverside, Nevada =

Unincorporated community in Nevada, US

Riverside
- Unincorporated community
- Location within the state of Nevada
- Coordinates: 36°44′10″N 114°13′14″W
- Country: United States
- State: Nevada
- County: Clark
- Time zone: UTC-8 (Pacific (PST))
  - Summer (DST): UTC-7 (PDT)
- Area codes: 702 and 725

Riverside is an unincorporated community in northeastern Clark County, Nevada, United States. It is located on the Virgin River near Bunkerville and Mesquite; the town is accessible via Nevada State Route 170, which connects all three towns. Riverside is the site of the highway bridge over the river.

== History ==
Riverside is located on the route of the Old Spanish Trail, that entered the Virgin River Valley after crossing the Beaver Dam Mountains, reaching the river at what is now Littlefield and passed down river past the site of Riverside to the Colorado River where it turned west. After 1847, avoid quicksands and marshes along the Virgin River that bogged down wagons, the wagon road called the Mormon Road that followed the Old Spanish Trail in many places, passed through the site of Riverside where it turned north, away from the old route, climbing toward Virgin Hill where it turned west to ascend a steep narrow ridge to the top of Mormon Mesa. The road then crossed Mormon Mesa to the Muddy River crossing it opposite the mouth of California Wash, west of modern Glendale, Nevada and continued up that wash to Las Vegas Springs.
