= Doubleup Hollow =

Valley in Beaver and Iron Counties, Utah

Doubleup Hollow is a valley in the Black Mountains in Beaver and Iron County, Utah. Its mouth lies at an elevation of 6,450 feet (1,970 meters). It heads at 38°07′34″N 112°44′14″W, at an elevation of 7,680 feet, in Beaver County.

== History ==
Doubleup Hollow is named for the practice that the Forty-niners and Mormon pioneers made of doubling up their wagon teams of oxen or mules to pull their wagons over the steep ridge between Doubleup Hollow and California Hollow where the Mormon Road ran between Greenville, Utah and Muley Point, over the Black Mountains. In 1855 the Mormon Road was realigned eastward from this old route over the Black Mountains to one from a crossing at Beaver, Utah to Muley Point through more wagon friendly terrain in Nevershine Hollow and over Beaver Ridge into the canyon of Fremont Wash that rejoined the original road above Muley Point.
