= Mormon Road =

19th century route between Salt Lake City and Los Angeles

Mormon Road, also known to the 49ers as the Southern Route, of the California Trail in the Western United States, was a seasonal wagon road pioneered by a Mormon party from Salt Lake City, Utah led by Jefferson Hunt, that followed the route of Spanish explorers and the Old Spanish Trail across southwestern Utah, northwestern Arizona, southern Nevada and the Mojave Desert of California to Los Angeles in 1847. From 1855, it became a military and commercial wagon route between California and Utah, called the Los Angeles – Salt Lake Road. In later decades this route was variously called the "Old Mormon Road", the "Old Southern Road", or the "Immigrant Road" in California. In Utah, Arizona and Nevada it was known as the "California Road".

Route of the Mormon Road 1849–1851 From the Mormon Waybill, Distances between stops from Temple block, Salt Lake City Settlements established after 1851 in italics.
Location	Distance
Willow Creek, Utah Territory; Sivogah, South Willow Creek (1849–1854); Draperville(1854– )	20.625 mi (33.193 km)
Summit of Ridge between Utah and Salt Lake Valleys, Utah Territory	4.875 mi (7.846 km)
American Creek, Utah Territory; Lake City (1852–1860); American Fork (1860– )	9.25 mi (14.89 km)
Provo River, Utah Territory; Fort Utah (1849–1850); Provo City(1850– )	11.5 mi (18.5 km)
Hobble Creek, Utah Territory; Hobble Creek (1850–1853); Springville(1853– )	7.25 mi (11.67 km)
Spanish Fork (river), Utah Territory; Spanish Fork (1851– )	6 mi (9.7 km)
Peteetneet Creek, Utah Territory; Peteetneet (1850–1853); Payson (1853– )	5 mi (8.0 km)
Salt Creek, Utah Territory; Salt Creek (1851–1882); Nephi (1882– )	25 mi (40 km)
Toola Creek, Utah Territory; Chicken Creek (1864–1876)	18.625 mi (29.974 km)
Sevier River Crossing, Utah Territory; Sevier River	6.25 mi (10.06 km)
Cedar Creek, Utah Territory; Cedar Springs(1855–1864); Holden (1864– )	25.5 mi (41.0 km)
3rd Creek south of Sevier River, Utah Territory; Fillmore (1851– )	10.0 mi (16.1 km)
4th Creek south of Sevier River, Utah Territory; Meadow Creek (1857–1864); Meadow (1864– )	8.0 mi (12.9 km)
Willow Flats, Utah Territory; Corn Creek Indian Farm (1854–1867); Petersburg (1859–1868); Petersburgh (1870–1877); Hatton (1877–1940)	3.625 mi (5.834 km)
Emigrant Spring, Utah Territory; Willden Fort (1860–1865); Cove Fort (1867– )	23.0 mi (37.0 km)
Sage Creek, Utah Territory	22.25 mi (35.81 km)
Beaver Creek, Utah Territory; Greenville (1861– )	5.125 mi (8.248 km)
North Canyon Creek, Utah Territory	27.25 mi (43.85 km)
2nd Creek, Utah Territory; Paragonah (1851– )	5.375 mi (8.650 km)
3rd Creek, Utah Territory; Parowan (1851– )	6.375 mi (10.260 km)
Cottonwood Creek, Utah Territory; Johnson Springs (1851– )	12.875 mi (20.720 km)
Cedar Springs, Utah Territory	9 mi (14 km)
Pynte Creek, Utah Territory	23 mi (37 km)
Road Springs, Utah Territory; Meadow Canyon, Mountain Meadow	9 mi (14 km)
Santa Clara River, Utah Territory; Gunlock (1857– )	16 mi (26 km)
Camp Springs, Utah Territory	17.125 mi (27.560 km)
Rio Virgin, New Mexico Territory at Beaver Dam Wash; Littlefield (1865– )	22.875 mi (36.814 km)
Rio Virgin, New Mexico Territory at Virgin Hill; East end of Mormon Mesa Cutoff	39.625 mi (63.770 km)
Muddy Creek, New Mexico Territory at California Wash; West end of Mormon Mesa Cutoff, California Crossing	19.625 mi (31.583 km)
Las Vegas Wash, New Mexico Territory	52.625 mi (84.692 km)
Las Vegas Springs, New Mexico Territory; Fort Las Vegas (1855–1857); Las Vegas Rancho (1865–1902); Las Vegas (1902– )	5 mi (8.0 km)
Cottonwood Spring, New Mexico Territory	17 mi (27 km)
Cottonwood Grove, New Mexico Territory	29.75 mi (47.88 km)
Resting Springs, California	21.75 mi (35.00 km)
Willow Spring, California on the Amargosa River	7 mi (11 km)
Salt Spring, California	14.125 mi (22.732 km)
Bitter Spring, California	38.75 mi (62.36 km)
Mojave River, California; Fork of the Road, (junction with Mohave Trail); Alcorn Ranch (1864–1866); Hawley's Station (1866–1882)	18.75 mi (30.18 km)
Last Ford on the Mojave, California; Lane's (1859–1865); Oro Grande (1881– )	51.5 mi (82.9 km)
Cahoon Pass, California; Coyote Canyon (1848–1850); Hogback Cutoff (1851–1855); Sanford Cutoff (1855–1861); Cajon Pass Toll Road (1861– )	17 mi (27 km)
? Camp, California	10 mi (16 km)
Coco Mongo Ranch, California	11.5 mi (18.5 km)
Del Chino Ranch, California	10 mi (16 km)
San Gabriel River, California	19.375 mi (31.181 km)
San Gabriel Mission, California; San Gabriel (1852– )	6 mi (9.7 km)
Pueblo de Los Ángeles, California; Los Angeles (1850– )	6 mi (9.7 km)
San Pedro, California	23.00 mi (37.01 km)

== Mormon Road 1847–1855 ==
=== Jefferson Hunt and Mormon Veterans Expeditions 1847–1848 ===
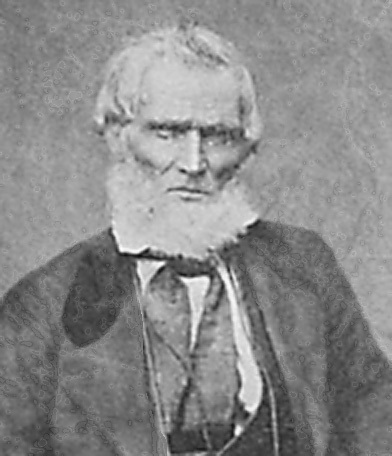
Jefferson Hunt

The wagon road later called the "Mormon Road" was pioneered by a Mormon party with pack horses, led by Jefferson Hunt, intent on obtaining supplies for the struggling, newly founded Salt Lake City, traveling to and from Southern California in the fall and winter of 1847–1848. Following Hunt's route back to Utah in 1848 were discharged veterans of the Mormon Battalion, taking the first wagons over the old pack trail. This route created by the returning veterans confirmed that a wagon route could be made from Salt Lake City southwest through southwestern Utah to link to the Old Spanish Trail at Parowan, that then followed the old pack trail, southwest to the Virgin River. Then using John Fremont's cutoff from the Virgin River at Halfway Wash, crossed southern Nevada, passing over the arid country between the Muddy River and Las Vegas Springs, then over the Spring Mountains at Mountain Springs and Nopah Range beyond through Emigrant Pass to Resting Springs in Southern California. Then, again following the Old Spanish Trail, southwest along the Amargosa River to Salt Spring then a long dry haul across the Mojave Desert to Bitter Spring and on to the Mojave River at Fork of the Road with the Mohave Trail. From there the route followed the river upstream to the crossing at its lower narrows. There they left the river, crossing the remaining desert to Cajon Summit on Baldy Mesa, then descended past Cajon Pass, through Crowder Canyon and the lower Cajon Canyon to the San Bernardino Valley. The road crossed the valley to the Rancho Santa Ana del Chino and then followed the Sonora Road from there west to the pueblo of Los Angeles.

=== Southern Route of the California Trail ===
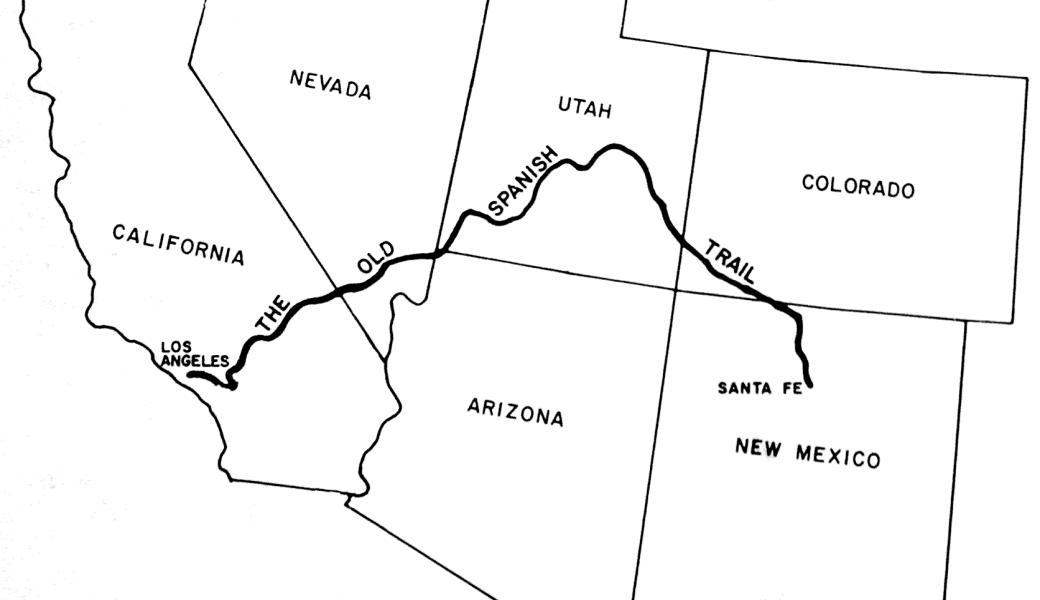
Route of the Old Spanish Trail from Santa Fe to Los Angeles.

The first large use of the route pioneered by Hunt and the Veterans were hundreds of late arriving Forty-niners, and some parties of Mormons, both packers and teamsters, looking to avoid the fate of the Donner Party, by using this snow free route into California in the fall and winter of 1849–1850. From Parowan onward to the southwest, the original route closely followed the route of the Old Spanish Trail diverting from that route between the Virgin River at Halfway Wash to Resting Springs, following the cutoff discovered by John Frémont on his return from California in 1844. This road only diverted to find places that could be traversed by the wagons of Mormon and Forty-niner parties that pioneered it. The principal change was the shortcut from the Virgin River where the road ascended to Mormon Mesa at Virgin Hill, crossed the mesa to the Muddy River and its crossing at California Wash. This saved the longer route to Halfway Wash through the quicksands along the Virgin River. The later immigrants and the Mormon colonists of San Bernardino, in the early 1850s found a better route through Cajon Pass along a hogback in the western side of the Upper Cajon Pass overlooked by Baldy Mesa. At the same time along the Mormon Road were being seeded many of the Mormon settlements that developed into towns and cities of modern Utah, Arizona, Nevada and Southern California.

== Los Angeles – Salt Lake Road 1855–1905 ==
By mid-1855 the Mormon Road had been improved and rerouted, to make it a military and commercial wagon road that ran between Salt Lake City, Utah and Los Angeles, California. In Cajon Pass the State of California paid to reroute the road from Coyote Canyon route to the Sanford Cutoff and made improvements to the route as far as the California border. In Utah Territory, the Federal government sent an engineer that built Leach's Cutoff between Cedar City and Mountain Meadow that shortened the route between Johnson Springs (now known as Enoch) and the meadow by 15 miles (24 km), avoiding the longer route via Cedar Spring, Antelope Spring, Pyute Creek to Road Springs at the lower end of Mountain Meadow. The road was also rerouted between Cove Creek to the crossing of Beaver River at modern Beaver, 3 miles (4.8 km) upriver from the old one at what in 1861 became the site of Greenville. This change was made with the major alteration from the new Beaver River crossing to Muley Point to shorten the route and avoid a difficult section of 6 miles (9.7 km) up California Hollow and over a steep mountain ridge in the Black Mountains, better suited to the Old Spanish Trail mule trains than wagons. The terrain feature called Doubleup Hollow at the point that steep ascent began is indicative of the technique of doubling up the wagon teams that was required to get wagons over the worst part of the climb. The new route passed through more wagon-friendly terrain in Nevershine Hollow and over Beaver Ridge into the canyon of Fremont Wash where it rejoined the original road. This route is the one Interstate 15 runs along today.

The road then soon became a winter seasonal route for trains of wagons carrying goods shipped by sea from San Francisco to San Pedro and then to Los Angeles. The trains left Los Angeles, (and later San Bernardino), for Salt Lake City during the late fall and returned by the end of the spring season, ending the isolation of Utah when the passes of the Sierra Nevada Mountains and Rocky Mountains were closed by snow. In California, the road became known as the Los Angeles – Salt Lake Road or Salt Lake Road, and in Utah and Nevada, the California Road.

In 1858, following the Mountain Meadows Massacre, the Dukes-Turner wagon company pioneered an alternate wagon route to avoid Leach's Cutoff and Mountain Meadow. It ran from Cedar City southward via the Black Ridge grade to the Virgin River, then up the Santa Clara River to link up with the old route of the Mormon Road at Camp Spring. As the Mormons began to settle the area from 1858, they opened stations at Washington and Fort Harmony to provide for feed and provisions to passing freighters for trade goods or cash.

In the 1860s the wagon road was a route of trade and migration from California to the gold rush country in Idaho and Montana. It was also the route of continued Mormon colonization of Washington County in Utah Territory and the lower reach of the Virgin River, in northern Arizona Territory, that part that later became Clark County, Nevada.

In 1865, the Miller Cutoff was constructed as a freight wagon road, to the north of the Virgin River to bypass the many crossings of that river, its quicksands, its sandy roads and the steep road into and out of the river valley at Virgin Hill. It ran between the old road at Castle Cliff, west to Mormon Well 12 miles (19 km) up Beaver Dam Creek from the Virgin River, then westward south of the mountains, to rejoin the old road on Mormon Mesa, south of Mormon Mountain.

With the advent of the transcontinental railroad in Utah in 1869, the wagon road was used decreasingly when long-haul wagons were replaced by wagons from the rail-heads as the rails advanced southwestward in Utah between the 1870s and 1890s. However, as a long-haul road it remained in use in Southern California until the Santa Fe Railroad came to Southern California in 1883. The northern Mojave Desert region of California, southern Nevada, and northwestern Arizona still used the road until the Salt Lake Route was built through them in 1903–1905.

== Legacy ==
In the early 20th Century, much of the old road became the Arrowhead Trail (auto trail) one of the first automobile highways in and between Utah, Southern Nevada and Southern California. I-15 follows or closely parallels its route for much of its length from Devore, California to Victorville, California, from Barstow, to Yermo, California, from Las Vegas, Nevada to Littlefield, Arizona and from St. George, Utah to Salt Lake City.

== See also ==
- Old Spanish Trail (trade route)
