= Camp Spring (Washington County, Utah) =

Spring in Washington County, Utah, US

Coordinates: 37°10′52″N 113°46′46″W

Camp Spring is a spring in Washington County, Utah. It lies at an elevation of 3,435 feet/1,047 meters in the reservation of the Shivwits Band of Paiutes.

== History ==
Camp Spring was a campsite for travelers on the wagon route of the Mormon Road between Salt Lake City, Utah Territory, and Los Angeles, California–first mentioned in the itinerary of the Mormon Waybill published in 1851. It may have first been a stop on the Armijo route of the Old Spanish Trail, the spring being along the Calabacillas Arroyo (Little wild squash arroyo, so named by Antonio Armijo), that lead up to Utah Hill Summit, where the old trail and later the road passed over the Beaver Dam Mountains from the Santa Clara River to the Virgin River at what is now Littlefield, Arizona.
