= Bryman, California =

Unincorporated community in California, United States

Coordinates: 34°40′29″N 117°20′44″W

Bryman, is a populated place in the central Mojave Desert, within San Bernardino County, California. It lies along the Mojave River in the northern Victor Valley, at an elevation of 2,526 feet (770 meters). It is on the historic U.S. Route 66, 5 miles north of Oro Grande, and south of Helendale.

== History ==
Bryman lies along the Mojave River, and was along the route of the Mohave Trail from the Colorado River to the valleys of Southern California before the time of the Spanish explorations. From 1828 it was along then Old Spanish Trail and from 1849 the later Mormon Road.

Bryman was the site of a "chalk" (actually aluminum silicate) processing plant that supported enough of a population for a school and a flag stop on the Santa Fe Railroad at one time. The chalk plant closed in 1939, but silicate mining in the area continued for some time after.

== Lane's Station ==
Bryman was initially a location of the second ranch called Lane's or Lane's Station belonging to Aaron G. Lane, one of the first settlers on the Mojave River. He relocated to the area 7 miles down river from his first ranch he had settled in 1859, (also called "Lane's"), at Lane's Crossing, for the better soil and water available from the river there. His ranch raised sheep and cattle and was well known for its crops of corn, melons and vegetables. He was one of the first to grow lucerne (alfalfa) in California, and sold his crops to the U. S. Army post at Camp Cady, from 1867.

He sold this ranch in November 1873.
