= California Hollow (Beaver County, Utah) =

Valley in Utah, United States

California Hollow is a valley in the Black Mountains in Beaver and Iron County, Utah. Its mouth lies at an elevation of 6,414 feet (1,955 meters). It heads at 38°08′41″N 112°42′48″W, at an elevation of 6,940 feet, in Beaver County.

== History ==
California Hollow lay along part of the original route of what was known during the California Gold Rush as the Southern Route of the California Trail, (later the Mormon Road), which passed over the Black Mountains between Greenville, Utah and Muley Point, on the way to California. In 1855 the Mormon Road was realigned eastward from this old route over the Black Mountains to one from a crossing at Beaver, Utah to Muley Point through more wagon friendly terrain in Nevershine Hollow and over Beaver Ridge into the canyon of Fremont Wash that rejoined the original road above Muley Point.
