= Sevier River Crossing (Mormon Road) =

Point on the Mormon Road in Utah

Sevier River Crossing of the Mormon Road was located above the confluence of the Sevier River with Chicken Creek, in Mills Valley, Juab County, Utah. The Crossing was located 120 miles from Salt Lake City, 24.875 miles south of Nephi and 25.5 miles north of Holden, on the Mormon wagon road to Los Angeles.

The crossing point was located a little below the old crossing of U.S. Route 91. I-15 now crosses at the same place as U.S. Route 91 did.
