= Emigrant Pass (Nopah Range) =

Gap in Inyo County, California

Coordinates: 35°52′58″N 116°03′38″W

Emigrant Pass, is a gap in the Nopah Range of Inyo County, California. It lies at an elevation of 2,884 feet (879 m) in the Nopah Range between Chicago Valley to the west and California Valley to the east.

== History ==
The Armijo route of the Old Spanish Trail pack horse and herding route between New Mexico and California passed through this pass from 1829 to 1848. From 1847 the wagon route from Salt Lake City to Los Angeles, called the Mormon Road, followed the old pack route through the pass, but on a parallel but more level route more suited to wagons. From 1849 Fortyniners and later emigrants followed this winter season wagon route to California as the Southern Route of the California Trail. The road through the pass was part of the 1855–1869 freight wagon road called the Los Angeles – Salt Lake Road.
