= Lane's Crossing =

Ghost town in San Bernardino County, California

- Ghost town
- Nickname: Lane's
- Location within the state of California Lane's Crossing (the United States)
- Coordinates: 34°34′30″N 117°19′56″W
- Country: United States
- State: California
- County: San Bernardino
- Elevation: 2,654 ft (809 m)

Population
  - Total: 0
- Time zone: UTC-8 (Pacific (PST))
  - Summer (DST): UTC-7 (PDT)
- ZIP codes: 92368

Lane's Crossing was a ford below the Lower Narrows of the Mojave River in San Bernardino County, California, United States. "Lane's", a ranch and store for travelers at this crossing on the Mormon Road, was established by "Captain" Aaron G. Lane the first pioneer settler on the Mojave River.

== History ==
Located along the Mojave River, the vicinity of modern Oro Grande, California was the location for Native American settlements hundreds of years. The river was also the part of a trade route from the Colorado River for tribes in the southwest with those on the coast of Southern California, what was called the Mohave Trail. Followed by Spanish padres and soldiers, and later American fur trappers and New Mexican traders the Mohave Trail became part of the Old Spanish Trail between New Mexico and Alta California from 1830. After the Americans acquired California in the Mexican–American War, Mormon pioneers began the Mormon Road a wagon road from Salt Lake City to Los Angeles on the western part of the Old Spanish Trail that crossed the Mojave River just below the Lower Narrows of the Mojave River. This was called the Last Crossing of the Mojave because the travelers on the road from here left the river to cross the remaining desert to Cajon Pass.

In 1859, the year after the Mojave Road to Fort Mohave was established, Aaron G. Lane a veteran of the Mexican War and a Forty-niner established the a ranch and store for travelers on the road at this crossing, that came to be called Lane's Crossing. This was the first settlement on the Mojave River. He sold out in 1865 and moved down river to establish a ranch at Bryman, and others took over his old ranch and store. However the name "Lane's" stuck for years thereafter, appearing on maps of the area as late as the 1880s. Today Lane's Crossing has been renamed to Turner Ranch just west of Mojave Heights, and southwest of Oro Grande. A historical marker in front of Turner Ranch signifies the location of Lane's Crossing.
