= Crowder Canyon =

Valley in San Bernardino County, California

Crowder Canyon, originally Coyote Canyon, is a valley in San Bernardino County, California. Its mouth was at an elevation of 2,999 feet / 914 meters at its confluence with Cajon Canyon. Its source was at an elevation of 4200 feet at 34°21′02″N 117°26′04″W near Cajon Summit. The canyon runs southward just west of the top of Cajon Pass then turns southwestward to meet Cajon Canyon.

== History ==
Coyote Canyon, now Crowder Canyon, was the route that the Old Spanish Trail, and then the Mormon Road, took as it passed through the Cajon Pass. Antonio Armijo, who pioneered the Old Spanish Trail, did not cross over the San Bernardino Mountains by the Mojave Trail route over Monument Peak but followed a route he called "Cañon de San Bernardino" from the upper Mojave River west through Cajon Pass and down Crowder Canyon and then Cajon Canyon. It was known to the vaqueros of the San Bernardino de Sena Estancia who had come to the aid of Armijo's party with food. This route ran along the course of Crowder Canyon to its mouth at Cajon Canyon and down to the mouth of the canyon at Sycamore Grove.

The 1851 Mormon Waybill, a pamphlet for travelers on the Mormon Road, written by Joseph Cain, one of the earliest travelers on the route in 1849, described conditions on this route as "Road bad down the canon." Originally the route of herds of horses and a trail for pack horse trains in single file, the first wagons had difficulty passing along the old horse trail, rocks had to be moved, trail widened or the wagons taken apart and carried over intractable obstructions. Soon an alternate and marginally less difficult but longer route on a narrow ridge was found some miles to the west in the upper Cajon Canyon. In 1855 the state of California funded a passable road a mile or so farther west called the Sanford Cutoff. In 1861, as a result of the Holcomb Valley gold rush, the difficult but shorter, Crowder Canyon route was made into a good road and a toll charged.

== Today ==
California State Route 138 now passes along Crowder Canyon between Cajon Junction on Interstate 15 and the summit of Cajon Pass.
