= Oro Grande, California =

Unincorporated community in California, United States

Oro Grande
- Unincorporated community
- Location within the state of California Oro Grande (the United States)
- Coordinates: 34°35′56″N 117°20′03″W
- Country: United States
- State: California
- County: San Bernardino
- Elevation: 3,000 ft (910 m)
- Time zone: UTC-8 (Pacific (PST))
  - Summer (DST): UTC-7 (PDT)
- ZIP code: 92368
- Area codes: 442/760
- FIPS code: 06-54330
- GNIS feature ID: 246972

Oro Grande (Spanish for "Large Gold") is an unincorporated community in the Mojave Desert of San Bernardino County, California, United States. It lies on the city boundary of Victorville and Adelanto. It is at 3,000 feet (910 m) elevation in Victor Valley north of the San Bernardino mountain range. It is located on old Route 66 near Interstate 15 between Victorville and Barstow. The ZIP code is 92368 and the community is inside area codes 442 and 760. Less than 1,000 residents live in the unincorporated area.

Neighboring townships include Silver Lakes, Helendale, Adelanto and Victorville.

== History ==
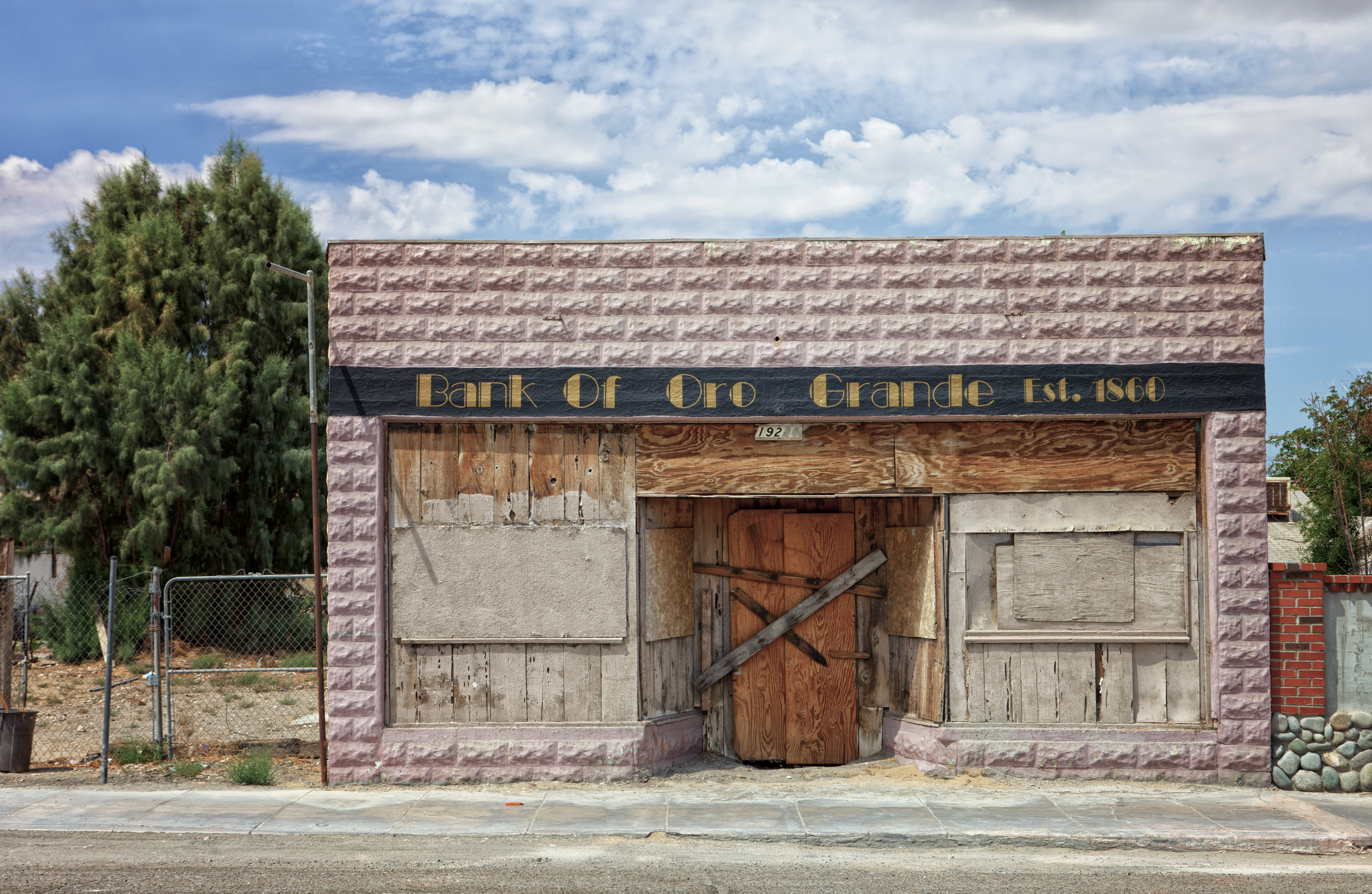
The Bank of Oro Grande

Located along the Mojave River, the vicinity of Oro Grande was the location for Native American settlements hundreds of years. The river was also the part of a trade route from the Colorado River for tribes in the southwest with those on the coast of Southern California, what was called the Mohave Trail. Followed by Spanish padres and soldiers, and later American fur trappers and New Mexican traders the Mohave Trail became part of the Old Spanish Trail between New Mexico and California from 1830. After the Americans acquired California in the Mexican American War, Mormon pioneers developed a wagon road from Salt Lake City to Los Angeles on the western part of the Old Spanish Trail crossing the Mojave River here just below the Lower Narrows of the Mojave River. In 1859, Aaron G. Lane established the a ranch and store for travelers on the road at this crossing, that came to be called Lane's Crossing. This was the first settlement on the Mojave River. He sold out in 1865 and moved down river to establish a ranch at Bryman, and others took over his old ranch.

In January, 1873, a strike found ore that ran $160 in gold and $18 in silver per ton at Silver Mountain east of Lane's new ranch, led to the organization of the Silver Mountain Mining District. In 1880, other strikes found $2,000 a ton in silver and $18,000 per ton in gold to the southwest led to the organization of the Red Mountain Gold and Silver Mining District and the construction of the mining town of Oro Grande almost 2 miles below Lane's old crossing east of the river. It was named after the first mine found, the Oro Grande Mine. The first houses were built and a post office established called Halleck in January 1881. A stamp mill for these mines was installed on the river, and later used for those of Calico. From 1887, limestone quarries opened and two kilns were produced lime for cement. From 1907, cement was made in Oro Grande. Marble was also mined. On May 25, 1927, the post office officially was renamed as Oro Grande. Nearby is the World War II Silver Peak Light Annex.

== Local attractions ==
- Calico Ghost Town
- Elmer's Bottle Tree Ranch
- Roy Rogers Ranch
- Caroli Lake Ranch

== Climate ==
According to the Köppen Climate Classification system, Oro Grande has a semi-arid climate, abbreviated "BSk" on climate maps.

Climate data for Oro Grande, California
Month	Jan	Feb	Mar	Apr	May	Jun	Jul	Aug	Sep	Oct	Nov	Dec	Year
Mean daily maximum °F (°C)	59 (15)	62 (17)	67 (19)	74 (23)	82 (28)	92 (33)	98 (37)	97 (36)	91 (33)	80 (27)	67 (19)	59 (15)	77 (25)
Mean daily minimum °F (°C)	30 (−1)	33 (1)	37 (3)	41 (5)	48 (9)	54 (12)	61 (16)	60 (16)	54 (12)	44 (7)	34 (1)	29 (−2)	44 (7)
Average precipitation inches (cm)	1 (2.5)	1.1 (2.8)	0.8 (2.0)	0.4 (1.0)	0.1 (0.25)	0 (0)	0.1 (0.25)	0.2 (0.51)	0.2 (0.51)	0.3 (0.76)	0.5 (1.3)	0.8 (2.0)	5.6 (14)
Source: Weatherbase
