= Mountain Springs, Nevada =

Unincorporated community in Nevada, US

Mountain Springs
- Unincorporated community
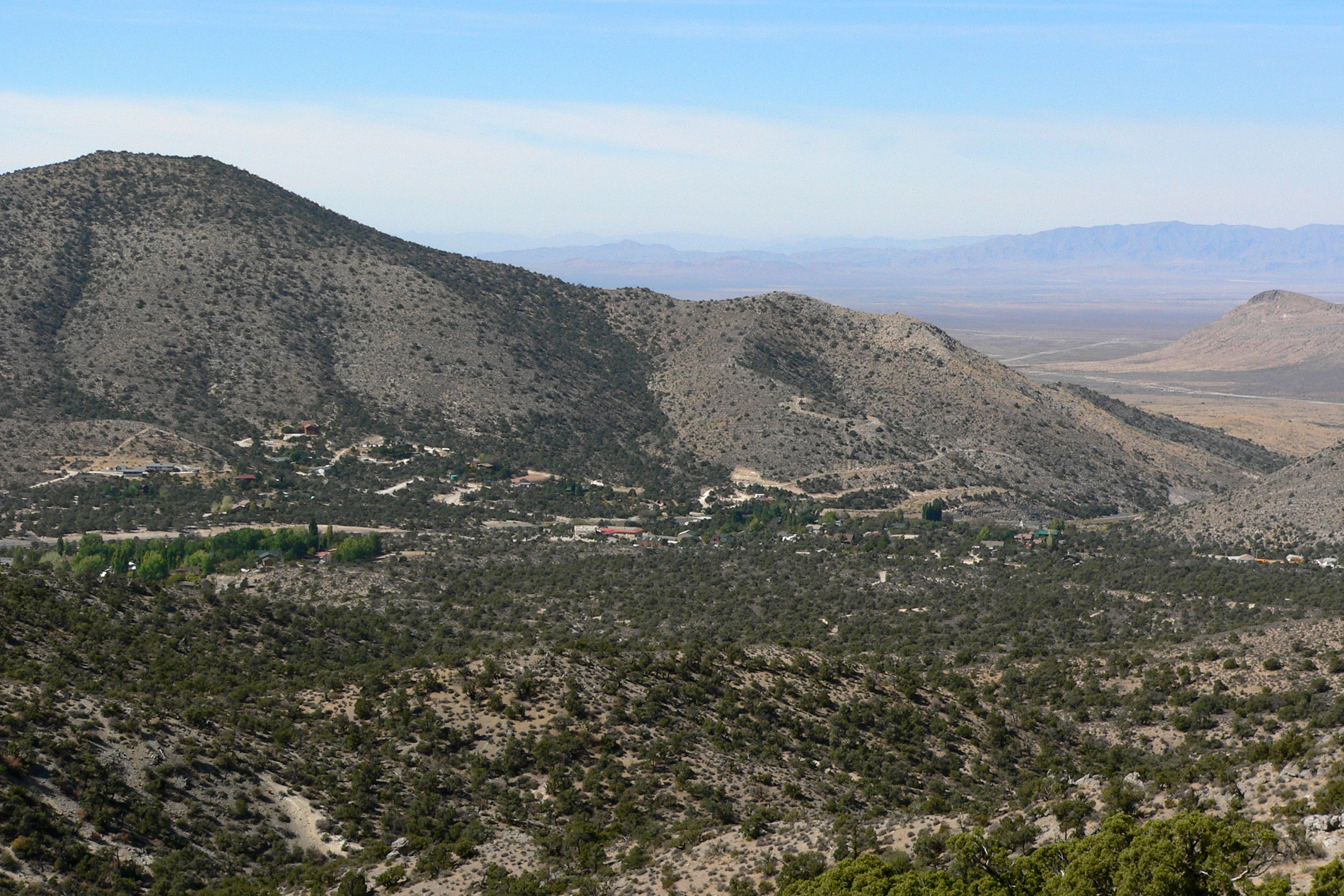
- View of Mountain Springs from the north

- Location within the state of Nevada
- Coordinates: 36°1′15″N 115°30′32″W
- Country: United States
- State: Nevada
- County: Clark
- Elevation: 5,410 ft (1,649 m)
- Time zone: UTC-8 (Pacific (PST))
  - Summer (DST): UTC-7 (PDT)
- ZIP codes: 89161
- Area codes: 702 and 725
- GNIS feature ID: 845578

Mountain Springs is an unincorporated community in Clark County in southern Nevada. It is located in Mountain Springs Summit, the pass over the Spring Mountains through which Highway 160 connects Las Vegas and Pahrump. Public buildings include a fire house and a saloon.

== History ==
In the Spring of 1844, the expedition of John C. Frémont discovered the shortcut route of the Fremont Cutoff, between Resting Springs and the Virgin River. Mountain Springs Summit was the mountain pass taken by this route over the Spring Mountains between the Pahrump Valley and the Las Vegas Springs in the Las Vegas Valley on the Old Spanish Trail. After 1848 it was followed by wagon trains on the Mormon Road, traveling between Southern California and Salt Lake City, Utah. The summit was named for the nearby Mountain Springs a watering place and camping location at the top of the pass at the spring.
