= Johnson Creek (Iron County, Utah) =

Stream in iron County, Utah, U.S.

Johnson Creek, originally known as Cottonwood Creek, is a stream in iron County, Utah, United States. Its mouth is in the Cedar Valley at an elevation of 5,407 feet (1,648 m), 1.5 miles (2.4 km) south of Rush Lake, where is dissipates into the ground. Its source is a group of springs, formerly known as Elkhorn Springs, later Johnson Springs, running from north to south, at the foot of the south end of the Red Hills at 37°46′32″N 113°01′31″W at an elevation of 5,500 to 5,510 feet in what is now Enoch, Utah.

== History ==
The Mormon Waybill an 1851 guide to the Mormon Road says that the campsite at Cottonwood Creek, has, "... good feed and water." Cottonwood Creek was 12.875 miles (20.720 km) southwest of Parowan Creek and 9 miles (14 km) northeast of Cedar Springs across the marshy Cedar Valley. The water of the creek was provided by the springs at the head of the stream, named for Joel H. Johnson, a Mormon, the earliest known settler at that location, in 1851. In 1854, other Mormon colonists settled along the creek and built a settlement nearby at 37°46′45″N 113°01′56″W called Fort Johnson.
