= Wild Goose Creek (Utah) =

Stream in Millard County, Utah, U.S.

Wild Goose Creek, originally known as Cedar Creek to the early travelers on the Mormon Road, is a stream, in Millard County, Utah, United States. Its mouth is located at Holden at an elevation of 5,125 feet (1,562 meters). Its source is at the head of Wild Goose Canyon, at elevation of 8,720 feet at 39°06′45″N 112°07′13″W in the Pahvant Range.

== See also ==
- List of rivers of Utah
