= Mountain Springs =

Mountain Springs may refer to:

- Mountain Springs, Nevada, unincorporated community in Clark County, Nevada
- Mountain Springs (Clark County), spring in the Spring Mountains in Clark County, Nevada
- Mountain Springs Summit, mountain pass in the Spring Mountains in Clark County, Nevada

== See also ==
- Antelope Hot Springs, natural hot springs in southeastern Oregon
- Mountain Spring (disambiguation)
