= Monument Peak (San Bernardino County) =

Mountain in California, USA

- Location within California

Highest point
- Elevation: 5,272 ft (1,607 m)
- Coordinates: 34°14′45″N 117°21′12″W

Geography
- Location: San Bernardino County, California, U.S.
- Parent range: San Bernardino Mountains
- Topo map: USGS San Bernardino North

Garcés-Smith Monument
- Interactive map of Garcés-Smith Monument

History
- Built: 1776

California Historical Landmark
- Designated: September 11, 1956
- Reference no.: 618

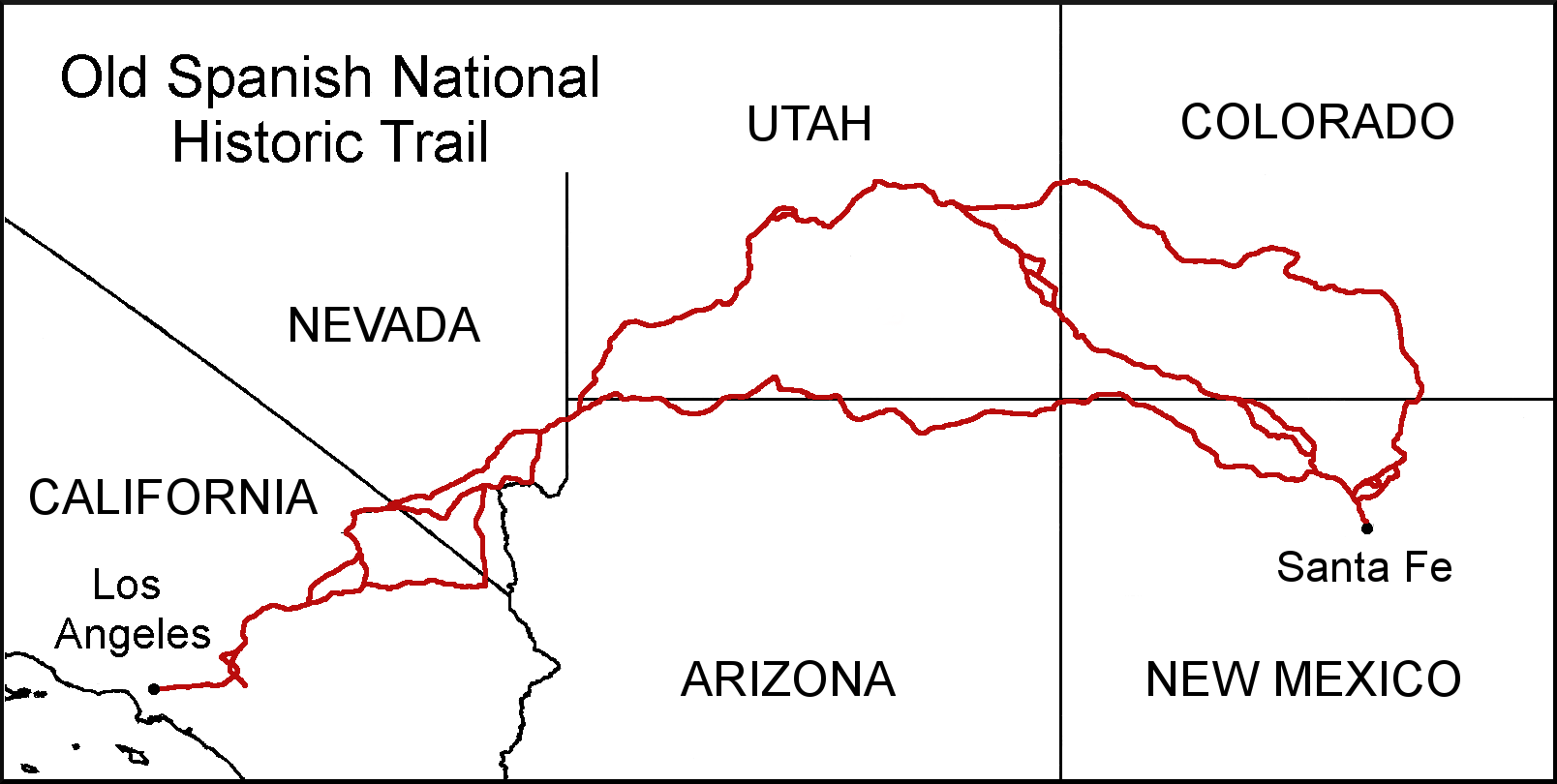
Old Spanish Trail map

Monument Peak is a summit in the San Bernardino Mountains, of San Bernardino County, California. It stands at an elevation of 5,272 ft (1,607 m).

== History ==
Monument Peak is the location where the Mohave Trail crossed the crest of the San Bernardino Mountains after ascending from the headwaters of the Mojave River up Sawpit Canyon and descended down the ridge between Cable Canyon and Devil Canyon to the San Bernardino Valley at the mouth of Cajon Pass.

The Garces-Smith Monument is located on the summit on Forest Road 2N49. This marker indicates the path of the Mohave Indian Trail, a centuries-old trade route linking the tribes of the Colorado River to those of the Pacific Ocean. It also memorializes two noted early travelers, Father Francisco Garcés, who in 1776 became the first known missionary explorer to travel across San Bernardino County and leave a written record of his experiences and Jedediah Smith, who in 1826, was the first known Anglo-American to use the Mohave Trail. A historical marker was placed on the site September 19, 1931, by the San Bernardino County Historical Society. This became California Historic Landmark no. 618 on September 11, 1956.

In 1829–30 Santa Fe, New Mexico, merchant Antonio Armijo led a trade party of 60 men and 100 mules to California, opening the Old Spanish Trail, following most of the route pioneered by those two pioneer explorers. Armijo did not cross over the mountains by the Mojave Trail route over Monument Peak but followed a route he called "San Bernardino Canyon" from the upper Mojave River west through Cajon Pass and down Crowder Canyon and Cajon Canyon, known to the vaqueros of the San Bernardino de Sena Estancia who had come to their aid with food.

== Marker ==
The marker at the site reads:

- Traveled by Fr. Francisco Garcés, March, 1776, and Jedediah S. Smith, November, 1826.

Erected 1931 by San Bernardino County Historical Society. (Marker Number 618.)

California Historic Landmark guide reads:

- NO. 618 GARCÉS-SMITH MONUMENT – This monument marks an old Indian trail, the Mojave Trail, used by Father Garcés in March 1776 on his trip from Needles to San Gabriel. The same trail was used by Jedediah Smith in 1826 on his first trip through San Bernardino Valley.'

== See also ==
- California Historical Landmarks in San Bernardino County, California
- History of San Bernardino, California
