= Cottonwood Spring (Blue Diamond, Nevada) =

Camp site in Blue Diamond, Nevada

Cottonwood Spring, located at Blue Diamond, Nevada, (formerly known as Ojo de Cayetana, or Pearl Spring), was a watering place and camp site on the Old Spanish Trail and then later on the Mormon Road between Mountain Springs and Las Vegas Springs. The springs are located on a hillside south of the town at 36°02′44″N 115°24′22″W at an elevation of 3409 feet.
