= Quartzite Mountain (California) =

Mountain in San Bernardino County, California

- Quartzite Peak

Highest point
- Coordinates: 34°36′38″N 117°17′15″W

Naming
- Etymology: Quartzite mining

Geography
- Location: San Bernardino County, California, USA

Quartzite Mountain, also known as Quartzite Peak, is a mountain that is located in San Bernardino County in the US state of California. The mountain has been of high commercial importance for any years being mined for its quartzite since 1928 with several million tons being produced.

The mountain is located close to several cities being around 8 km (5 mi) north of Victorville and 1.6 to 6.4 km (1-4 mi) east of Oro Grande. It is around 136.7 km (85 mi) by railway or highway from Los Angeles. Apple Valley is also nearby being 15.3 km (9.5 mi) southeast.

== Geology ==
The mountain contains large-masses uniform and high-purity quartzite. Limestones are also associated with the quartzite. The two units of quartzite are indistinguishable from each other being composed of vitreous, light to medium gray with only occasional suggestions of bedding.

At the bottom of the northeast slope of the mountain is white dolomite with the unit being 364.7 meters (1,200 ft) thick followed by a dark schist-hornfels unit around 106.6 m (350 ft) thick. The third layer is blue-gray limestone with a thickness of 76.2 m (250 ft). The fourth and fifth layers were schist-quartzite and lower quartzite with thicknesses of 18.2 m (60 ft) and 76.2 m (250 ft) respectively. The final top two layers are black schist with limestone subunits with a thickness of 152.4 m (500 ft) and finally upper quartzite with a thickness of 76.2 m (250 ft).

The rocks exhibit strong foliation, repetitive layering of metamorphic rocks.

== Importance ==
Since 1928, several million tons of high-purity quartzite has been mined and furnished from the Oro Grande series and Quartzite Mountain. The Atlas Quarry was opened in 1939 and has produced 150,000 to 200,000 tons of quartzite. The limestone deposited that are associated with the quartzite have been of great commercial value importance for many years. It has supplied the portland cement plants of Victorville and Oro Grande. Up until 1955, some of the mined quartzite was used to make silica bricks.
