= Nevershine Hollow =

Valley in Utah, United States

Nevershine Hollow is a valley east of the South Hills, in Beaver County, Utah. The mouth of the valley is at an elevation of 6,165 feet (1,879 meters). Its head is at an elevation of 6,500 feet at 38°09′43″N 112°36′38″W, north of Beaver Ridge.

== History ==
Nevershine Hollow was on the new 1855 cutoff route from the original Old Spanish Trail and the original and more difficult route of the Mormon Road in the Black Mountains to the west. The 1855 cutoff made a crossing at Beaver, Utah, (3 miles east up the Beaver River from the old crossing at modern Greenville, Utah), passed through more wagon friendly terrain in Nevershine Hollow and over Beaver Ridge into the canyon of Fremont Wash to Muley Point.
