= Beaver Ridge (Beaver County, Utah) =

Coordinates: 38°09′13″N 112°36′41″W

Beaver Ridge a ridge in Beaver County, Utah. It lies south of Nevershine Hollow and north of the canyon of Fremont Wash. It reaches an elevation of 6,552 feet (1,997 meters).

== History ==
Beaver Ridge is the top of the pass between the valley of the Beaver River and the Parowan Valley. This was the apex of the 1855 cutoff from the original, more difficult route of the Mormon Road in the Black Mountains to the west. The 1855 cutoff made a crossing at Beaver, Utah, (3 miles east up the Beaver River from the old crossing at modern Greenville, Utah), passed through more wagon friendly terrain in Nevershine Hollow and over Beaver Ridge into the canyon of Fremont Wash to Muley Point.
