= Wilson Pass =

Wilson Pass may refer to:

- Wilson Pass (Antarctica)
- Wilson Pass (Clark County, Nevada)
