= Mountain Springs (Clark County) =

Water source in the Spring Mountains, Nevada

Coordinates: 36.0243°N 115.5045°W

Mountain Springs is a spring in the Spring Mountains in Clark County, Nevada. The spring lies at an elevation of 5,528 feet (1,685 m), north of the town of Mountain Springs, Nevada.

== History ==
John C. Frémont described the spring when his expedition encountered it while exploring what became the Fremont Cutoff on May 1, 1844:

We encamped at a spring in the pass, which had been the site of an old village. Here we found excellent grass, but very little water. We dug out the old spring, and watered some of our animals. The mountain here was wooded very slightly with the nut pine, cedars, and a dwarf species of oak; and among the shrubs were Purshia tridentata, artemisia, and ephedra occidentalis.

William Chandless, an Englishman traveling the Mormon Road on horseback from Salt Lake City to Los Angeles, rode up to Mountain Springs from Las Vegas Springs on January 18, 1856. He described the route and the spring thus:

The cliffs soon after you leave the valley of Los Vegos are very beautiful from their colour, the purple and crimson as rich as those of the most gorgeous sunset. The Mountain Springs, too, was a pretty spot, among pine, and cedar-wood, and high mountain tops; and though a regular camping place on the route, yet with an air of solitude very impressive. A small bright-blue bird, the first sign of a warmer climate, kept hopping round and, as it seemed, warming himself at our pine-wood fire, all the time singing merrily. Though at a considerable elevation, we found no snow here, nor even saw it on the peaks very much above us; but at Cottonwood Creek, fifteen miles back, and before you begin to ascend, we came upon a little in a sheltered place—the only snow we saw in the four hundred miles from the rim of the Basin to the Sierra Nevada.

Leaving the springs, Chandless took the Kingston Cutoff, a horse mail trail, which ran 40 waterless miles from Mountain Springs to Kingston Springs and another 40 miles to Bitter Spring, linking up again with the Mormon Road along Salt Creek in Silurian Valley.
