= Chicken Creek, Utah =

Ghost town in Juab County, Utah, United States

Coordinates: 39°32′19″N 111°54′45″W

Chicken Creek is a ghost town in southeastern Juab County, Utah, United States.

== History ==
Two families from Nephi established a ranch on Chicken Creek, in 1860. It was located 14 miles (23 km) south of Nephi along the Mormon Road. By 1864 it had grown into a settlement called Chicken Creek and had acquired its own post office. In 1868, the town of Levan was established upstream 3 miles (4.8 km) northeast of Chicken Creek. By 1871, Levan's success as a farming community led to Chicken Creek gradually being abandoned. Its post office was closed in 1876; only a few ruins of foundations and fireplaces remained.

== See also ==
- List of ghost towns in Utah
