= Fremont Canyon =

Fremont Canyon may refer to:

- A tributary of Santiago Creek in Orange County, California
- Fremont Canyon (Utah), and the upper part of Fremont Wash in Iron County, Utah
- Fremont Canyon (Natrona County, Wyoming), a Bureau of Land Management Back Country Byway
- Fremont Canyon Powerplant, at the Pathfinder Dam on the North Platte River, Wyoming

== See also ==
- Fremont Cannon
