= California Valley =

California Valley, may mean:

A valley:

- California Valley (Inyo County) in Inyo County, California
- California Valley, Chile in Los Lagos Region

A populated place:

- California Valley, California
