= Virgin Hill (Nevada) =

Hill

Coordinates: 36°45′53″N 114°13′25″W

Virgin Hill is a summit in Clark County, Nevada. It rises to an elevation of 1,808 feet / 551 meters.

== History ==
Virgin Hill is a steep hill that marked where the Mormon Road climbed from the valley of the Virgin River near Riverside to the Mormon Mesa, north of the hill.

== See also ==
- List of mountains of Nevada
