= Iron Springs (Iron County, Utah) =

Coordinates: 37°55′45″N 113°16′36″W

Iron Springs, originally Cedar Springs, was a spring in the bed of Iron Springs Creek in what is now Iron County, Utah. The creek originally drained the western side of Cedar Valley before it was settled. Cedar Springs was located in the gap where the creek passed between the mountains of The Three Peaks and Granite Mountain. Cedar Springs was a camp for early travelers on the Mormon Road, after they had made the arduous passage from Johnson's Springs across the marshy and wooded Coal Creek. It was difficult to cross with wagons at that point in Cedar Valley. The road crossed Coal Creek midway across the valley between Johnson Springs and Cedar Springs. The travelers guide, Mormon Waybill described Cedar Spring "... wood plenty food short, Good camp". When Cedar City was established on the upper reach of Coal Creek in 1851, the road was diverted to the easy crossing there and then proceeded across the valley to Iron springs, a longer route but less arduous.

Later a settlement named Iron Springs developed at the springs that had by then had been renamed Iron Springs for iron in the nearby mountains around it in the Iron Mountain District.
