= Red Creek (Paragonah) =

Stream in Iron County, Utah

Red Creek is a stream in Iron County, Utah. Its mouth lies at an elevation of 5,925 feet (1,806 meters) near Paragonah, Utah. Its source is located at an elevation of 9,560 feet at 37°48′55″N 112°40′32″W near Willow Spring in the Markagunt Plateau.

== History ==
Red Creek was originally known by the early travelers on the Mormon Road as the 2nd Creek in the Little Salt Lake Valley, now known as the Parowan Valley, as one traveled southward in the valley. It was a camping spot on the road described in the 1851 Mormon Waybill as having: "...good feed, and wood."

== See also ==
- List of rivers of Utah
