= Wilson Pass (Clark County, Nevada) =

Coordinates: 35°52′34″N 115°30′38″W

Wilson Pass is a gap in Clark County, Nevada. It lies at an elevation of 5033 feet in the Spring Mountains between Goodsprings Valley and Mesquite Valley.

== History ==
The Armijo Route of the Old Spanish Trail passed through this gap in the Spring Mountains as it ran between the springs in Goodspring Valley to Resting Springs in Inyo County, California.
