= Mountain Spring =

Mountain Spring may mean:

- Mountain Spring (Imperial County, California)
- Mountain Spring, San Diego County, California a locale in San Diego County
- Enterprise, Butte County, California, also known as Mountain Spring, now inundated by Lake Oroville

== See also ==
- Mountain Springs (disambiguation)
