= Baldy Mesa =

Summit in San Bernardino County, California

Baldy Mesa is a summit whose tallest peaks on its southern extremity, overlook the upper Cajon Canyon in San Bernardino County, California. Its tallest point is an unnamed 4,964 foot high hill on the southwest end of the mesa overlooking the upper Cajon Canyon. The heights that lie along the ridge overlooking the canyon toward the east gradually descend in elevation from one approximately 4,770 feet to the 4,606 foot hill at its far southeastern end at 34°21′34″N 117°28′39″W. The mesa descends gradually in elevation to the north, toward the distant Mohave River. it is bounded on the east by the Oro Grande Wash.
