= Chalk Creek (Millard County, Utah) =

Creek in Millard County, Utah, United States

Chalk Creek is a stream in Millard County, Utah, United States.

== Description ==
It was originally known as 3rd Creek south of Sevier River to the early travelers on the Mormon Road. Its mouth is at the endorheic basin called The Sink in the Pahvant Valley at an elevation of 4,639 feet (1,414 m). Its source is located at the confluence of North Fork Chalk Creek with South Fork Chalk Creek, at an elevation of 5,482 feet (1,671 m), at 38°56′59″N 112°16′06″W in the Pahvant Range. Fillmore is 3 miles (4.8 km) below the source of Chalk Creek along the south bank of the stream.

== See also ==
- List of rivers of Utah
