= Utah Hill Summit =

Summit and gap in Washington County, Utah

Coordinates: 37°06′10″N 113°49′37″W

Utah Hill Summit is a summit and a gap in the Beaver Dam Mountains in Washington County, Utah. It lies at an elevation of 4,731 / 1,442 meters.

== History ==
The route of the Old Spanish Trail and the Mormon Road passed over "Utah Hill".

Today it is the route of Highway 91, from Littlefield, Arizona to Saint George, Utah passes over Utah Hill Summit.
