= Spanish Valley (Utah) =

Flat in Utah, United States

Coordinates: 38°29′40″N 109°27′30″W

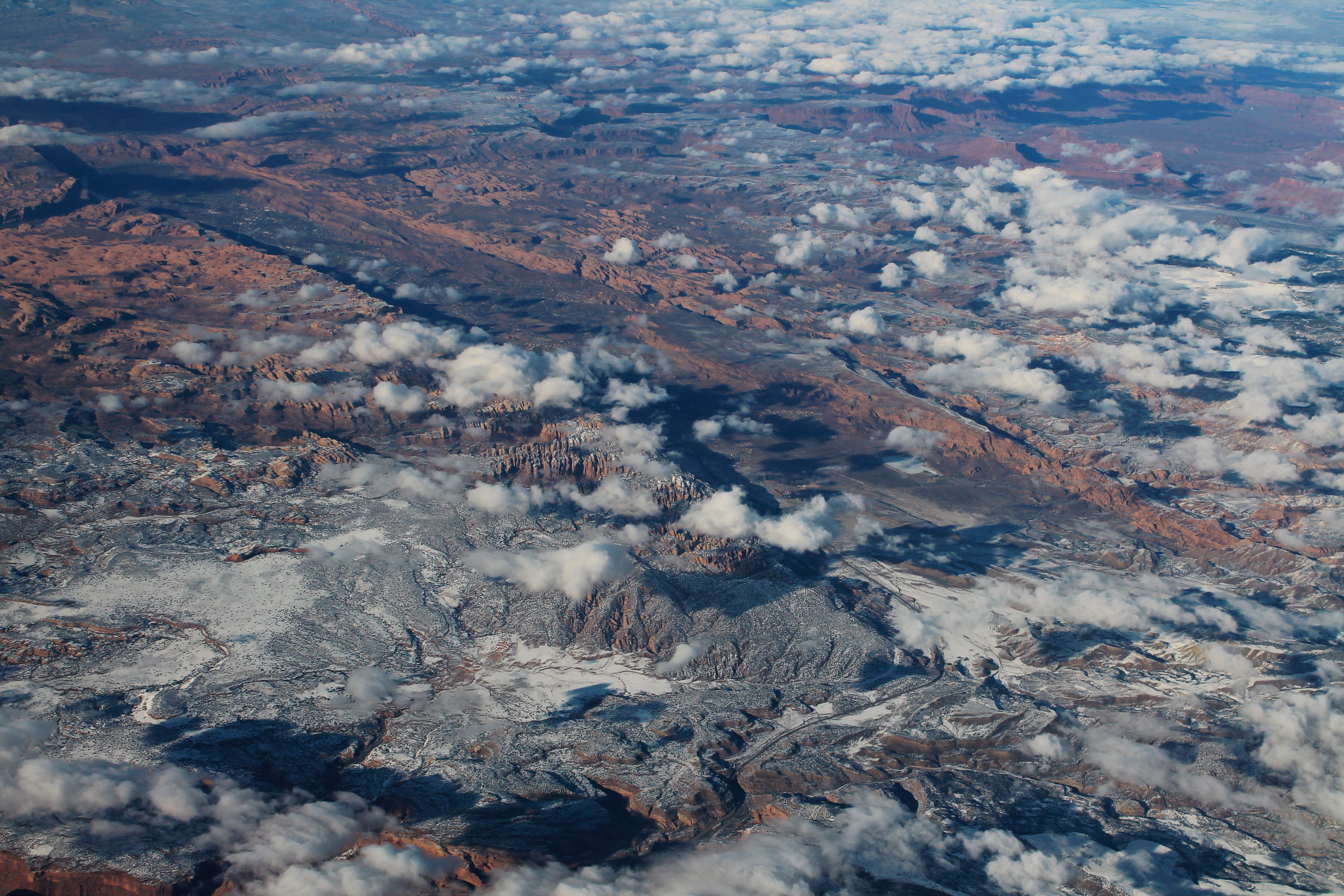
Aerial view of the valley

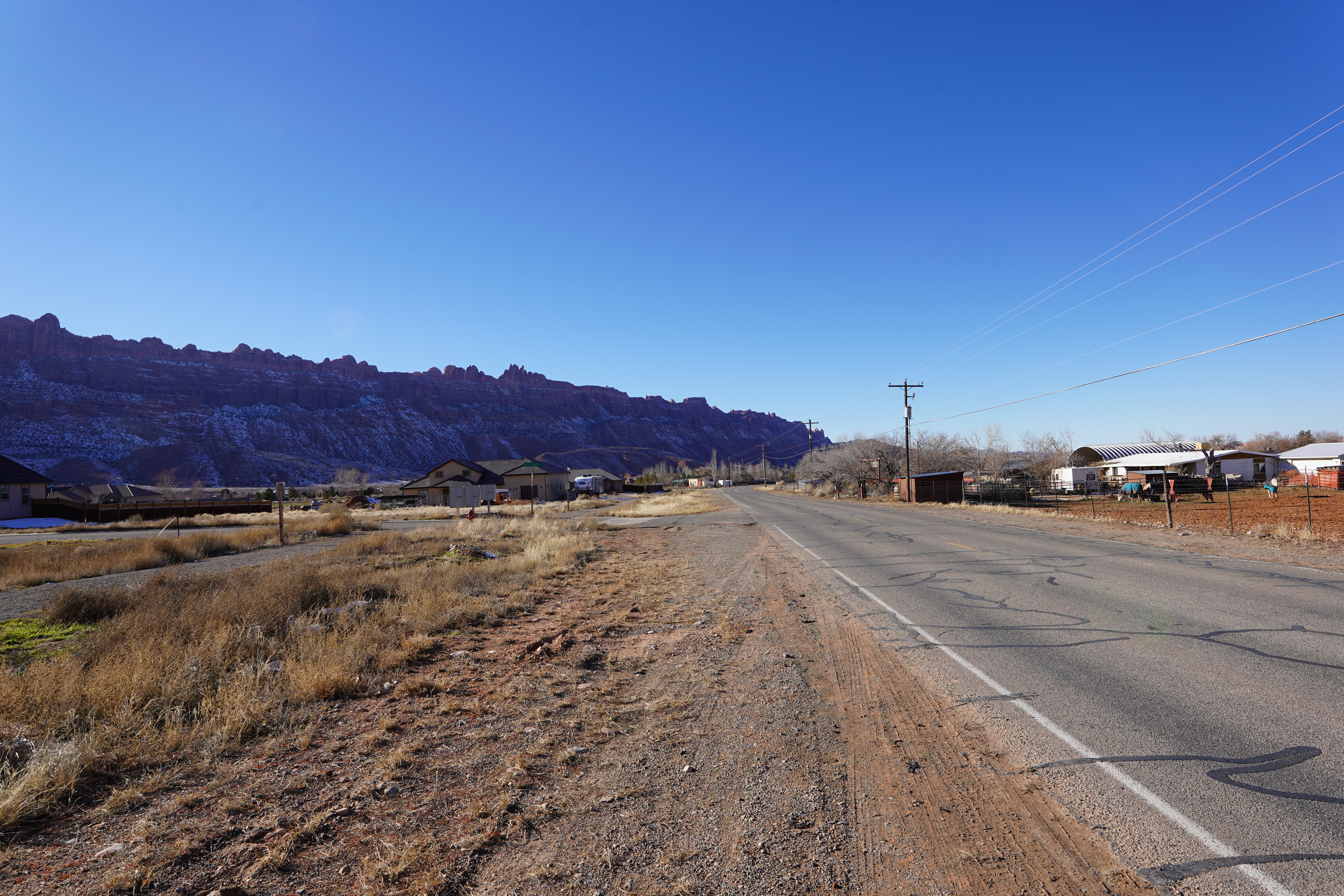
Typical farmland and housing.

Spanish Valley is a flat in Grand and San Juan counties in Utah, United States, south of Moab.

== Description ==
The valley lies at an elevation of 4,331 feet (1,320 m), and is south southeastward of the Moab Valley. Pack Creek flows through Spanish Valley north northwestward into Moab Valley toward its confluence with the Colorado River.

== History ==
The Old Spanish Trail passed through Spanish Valley on its way to its Colorado River crossing at what is now Moab.

== See also ==
- List of valleys of Utah
