= Parowan Creek =

Stream in the Parowan Valley of Iron County, Utah

Parowan Creek, is a stream in the Parowan Valley of Iron County, Utah. It flows north through Parowan, Utah to its mouth at an elevation of 5,686 feet (1,733 meters) at the Little Salt Lake in Parowan Valley. Its source is located at an elevation of 9,980 feet at 37°40′57″N 112°51′16″W in Brian Head, Utah in the Markagunt Plateau.

== History ==
Parowan Creek was originally known by the early travelers on the Mormon Road as the 3rd Creek in the Little Salt Lake Valley, now known as the Parowan Valley, as one traveled southward in the valley. It was a camping spot on the road described in the 1851 Mormon Waybill as having: "...good feed, and wood."

== See also ==
- List of rivers of Utah
