= Little Salt Lake =

Lake in the state of Utah, United States

- Location within Utah Location within the United States
- Location: Iron, Utah, United States
- Coordinates: 37.902°N 112.902°W
- Lake type: Endorheic
- Primary outflows: Evaporation
- Basin countries: United States
- Surface elevation: 5,682 ft (1,732 m)

Little Salt Lake (also called Parowan Lake), is a dry lake in east‑central Iron County, Utah, United States.

== Description ==
The lake has an elevation 5,682 feet (1,732 m) and is located on the southwestern edge of the Parowan Valley at the eastern foot of the Red Hills, immediately east of the Parowan Gap, west of Interstate 15 and Paragonah, and northwest of Parowan.

== History ==
Little Salt Lake originally was a seasonal, shallow, brackish sink fed by springs, Fremont Wash and streams emerging from the Hurricane Cliffs in the Parowan Valley. Local Native American people lived in the vicinity of the lake, who called it "Paragoon," which meant "vile water." Long ago a creek drained the lake westward through the Parowan Gap in the Red Hills.

Later Americans named the lake, Little Salt Lake in contrast to the larger Great Salt Lake to the north. Its original Piute name with some alteration was given to the valley and the towns of Paragonah and Parowan.

Diversion of water from creeks and springs for irrigation of crops has ended Little Salt Lake as a seasonal wetland, reducing it to an arid playa.

== See also ==
- List of lakes in Utah
