= Mojave Heights, California =

Unincorporated community in California, United States

Coordinates: 34°34′07″N 117°19′32″W

Mojave Heights is an unincorporated community in the Victor Valley of the Mojave Desert, within San Bernardino County, California.

It lies just west of the old U.S. Route 66 (National Trails Highway). The town is located just south of Oro Grande, between Victorville and Adelanto.

It lies at an elevation of 2,759 feet (841 m).
