= Fremont Canyon (Utah) =

Fremont Canyon is a stream and a deep valley or canyon that runs from its mouth at its confluence with Coyote Creek at the head of Fremont Wash in Iron County, Utah, eastward across the Tushar Mountains to its head at 38°05′05″N 112°27′35″W on the west side of Fremont Pass in Garfield County, Utah.

The Canyon was named for John C. Frémont.
