= Elmer's Bottle Tree Ranch =

Tourist attraction in California

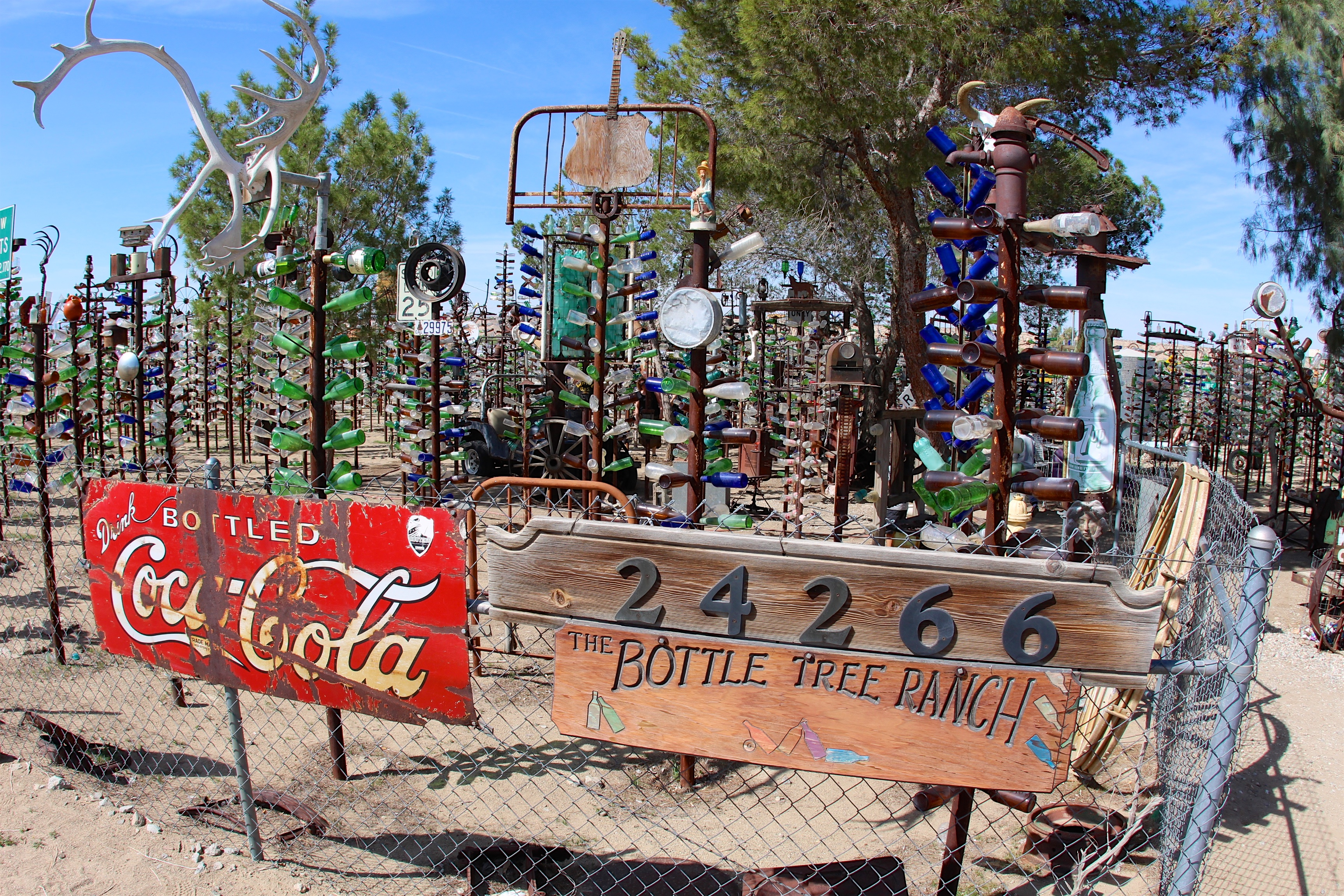
- The ranch in 2016

- Location within the Los Angeles metropolitan area Elmer's Bottle Tree Ranch (California) Elmer's Bottle Tree Ranch (the United States)

General information
- Location: 24266 National Trails Hwy, Oro Grande, CA 92368
- Coordinates: 34.6907°N 117.3395°W
- Named for: Elmer Evan Long Jr.
- Owner: Elliot Long

Technical details
- Grounds: 2 acres (0.81 ha)

Website
- thebottletreeranch.com

Elmer's Bottle Tree Ranch is a ranch near Oro Grande, California. It is a popular stop for people passing by on Route 66. The 2 acres (0.81 ha) ranch was created in 2000 by Elmer Long and has more than 200 bottle trees. It is open from sunrise to sunset and is free to enter.

== History ==
As a child in the 1950s, Long camped in the Mojave Desert with his father, Elmer Long Sr., collecting objects they found and keeping notes on their location. Long Sr. was an aviation engineer in Manhattan Beach and was interested in the desert. After his dad's death, he came into possession of many colorful bottles his dad had collected. Long, wanting to put the bottles to use, tied some to a wooden post, creating the first bottle tree. When the sun rose the following morning, he was fascinated by how the light caught them and decided to make more.

Long died of lung cancer on June 22, 2019, causing the ranch to close for a few months, reopening in early September. He was buried at Victor Valley Mortuary in Victorville. Elmer's son, Elliot, took over the ranch after his death.

== Description ==
The ranch is mainly a forest of bottle trees — pipes made out of metal from which glass bottles (mainly of the soda and beer variety) are hung. Other installations include a boat filled with bottles and a tree made out of a used missile. Most trees have unique decorations on top of them, like a handmade rake, an electric guitar, a surfboard, a wagon, and a gumball machine. Other miscellaneous items, such as farm equipment, a typewriter, and a Jeep can also be found on the property. Geese occasionally appear as well.
