= Wild Goose Canyon =

Stream in Millard County, Utah, U.S.

Wild Goose Canyon is a stream, in Millard County, Utah, USA. Its mouth is located just north of Wild Goose Spring at an elevation of 6,243 feet (1,903 m). Its head is at an elevation of 8,720 feet (2,660 m) at 39°06′47″N 112°07′12″W in the Pahvant Range.
