= Coal Creek (Iron County, Utah) =

Stream in Utah, United States

Coal Creek is a stream in eastern Iron County, Utah, United States.

== Description ==
The creek's mouth was at an elevation of 5,545 feet (1,690 m) in Cedar Valley in 1979, but that location is now a farm field, and its new terminus is located a little further upstream, 4.3 miles (6.9 km) northwest of Cedar City. Its source is at the confluence of Crow Creek and Ashdown Creek, in Cedar Canyon, at the foot of Cedar Mountain at 37°37′49″N 112°56′10″W at an elevation of 7,075 feet (2,156 m). Coal Creek passes through Cedar City on its way to Cedar Valley.

== See also ==
- List of rivers in Utah
