= Old Spanish Trail (trade route) =

Historic trade route in the Southwestern United States

- The Old Spanish Trail
- U.S. National Register of Historic Places
- U.S. Historic district
- Nevada Historical Markers No. 31, 32, 33, 34, 139, 140, 141, 142
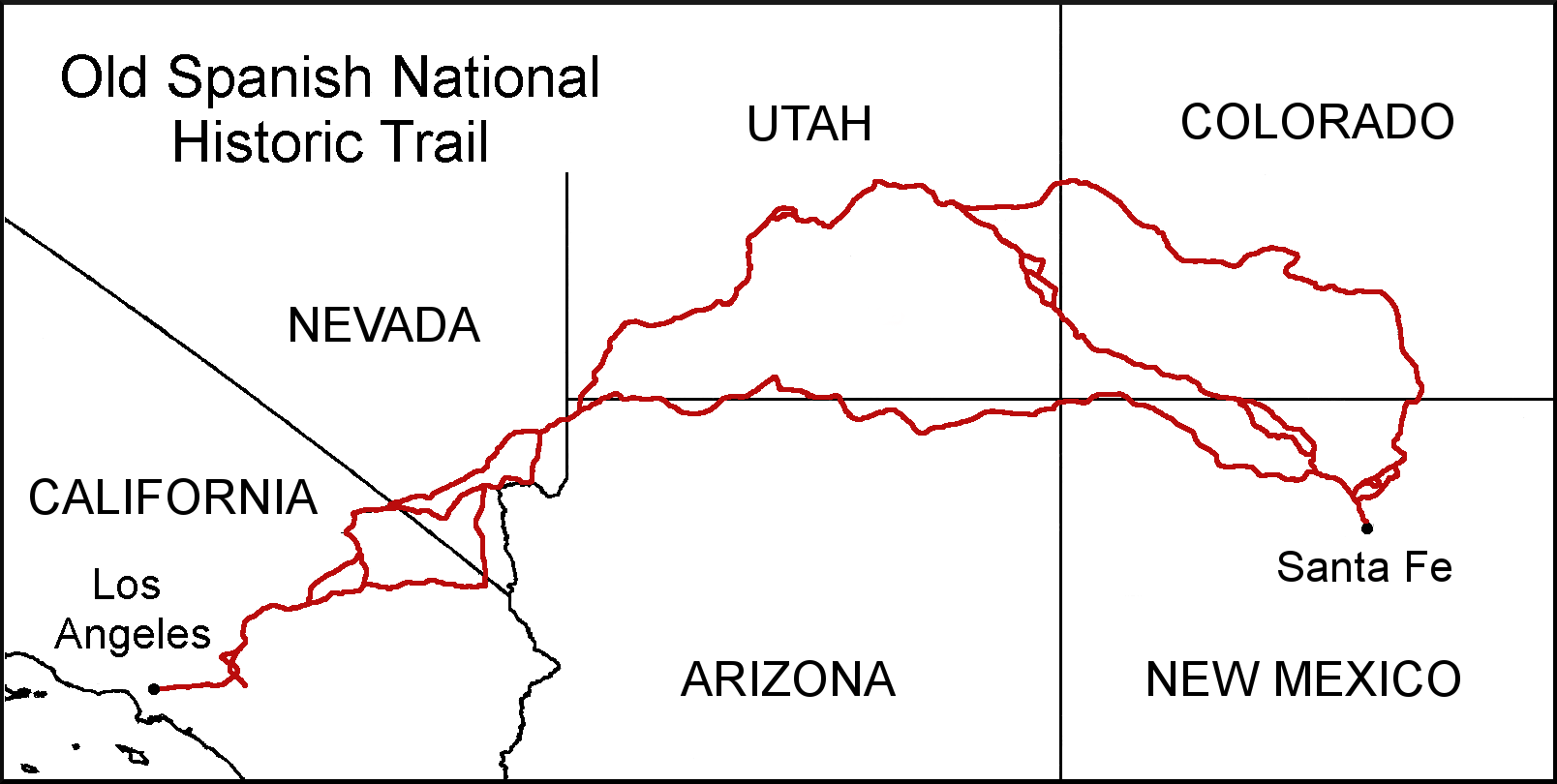
- The route of the Old Spanish Trail.
- Location: Santa Fe, NM–Los Angeles, CA
- NRHP reference No.: 88001181 (original); 01000863 (increase 1); 08000229 (increase 2)
- Markers No.: 31, 32, 33, 34, 139, 140, 141, 142

Significant dates
- Added to NRHP: Utah: October 6, 1988
- Boundary increases: Nevada: August 22, 2001; Nevada: March 21, 2008

The Old Spanish Trail (Spanish: Viejo Sendero Español) is an historic trade route through the American Southwest that connected the colonial Spanish settlements of Nuevo México near Santa Fe with those of Los Angeles and the rest of Alta California. Approximately 700 mi (1,100 km) long, the trail and its many variants ran through areas of high mountains, arid deserts, and deep canyons. It is considered one of the most arduous of all trade routes ever established in the United States. Explored in part by Spanish explorers as early as the late 16th century, the trail was extensively used by traders with pack trains from about 1830 until the mid-1850s. The area was part of Mexico from Mexican independence in 1821 until it was ceded to the United States in 1848.

The name of the trail comes from John C. Frémont's report on his 1844 journey from California to New Mexico for the U.S. Topographical Corps, which was guided by Kit Carson. The name acknowledges that parts of the trail had been known and used by the Spanish since the 16th century. Frémont's report identified a trail that had already been in use for about 15 years. The trail is important to New Mexico history because it established an arduous but usable trade route with California.

In 2002 the trail was designated by Congress as part of the National Trails System under the name Old Spanish National Historic Trail.

== History ==
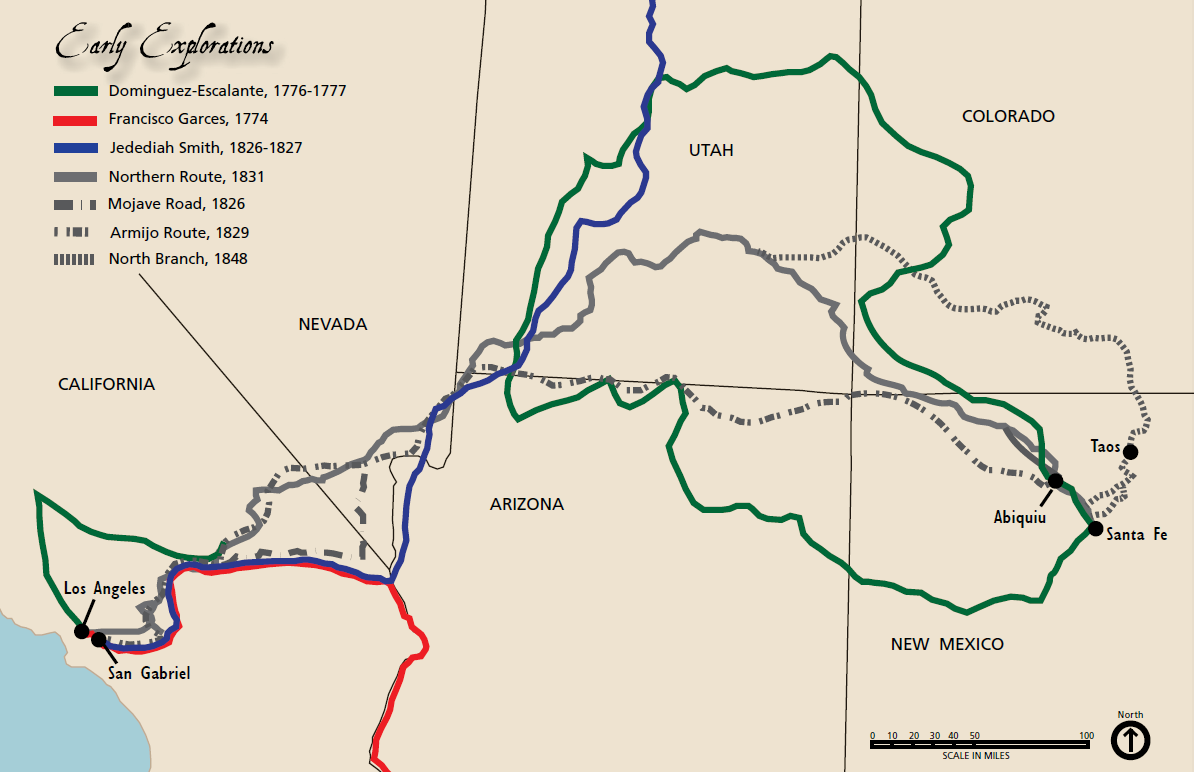
Timeline: Early exploration of the Old Spanish Trail (National Park Service)

The trail is a combination of a network of trails first established by indigenous people and later used by Spanish explorers, trappers, and traders with the Ute and other indigenous tribes. The eastern parts of what later became the Old Spanish Trail, in what is now southwest Colorado and southeast Utah, were explored by Juan Maria de Rivera in 1765. Franciscan missionaries Francisco Atanasio Domínguez and Silvestre Vélez de Escalante unsuccessfully attempted to blaze an overland route to California, which was just being settled, in 1776 during the Domínguez–Escalante expedition. They departed from Santa Fe and traveled across large parts of the Colorado Plateau, reaching the edge of the Great Basin near Utah Lake before returning via the Arizona Strip. Other expeditions, including those led by Franciscan missionary Francisco Garcés and by Captain Juan Bautista de Anza, explored and traded in the southern part of the region. They found shorter and less arduous routes through the mountains and deserts that connected Sonora to New Mexico and California, but these did not become part of the Old Spanish Trail, with the exception of some of the paths through the Mojave Desert. The Mohave Trail was first traveled by Garcés from the Mohave villages on the Colorado River westward across the Mojave Desert, with stops at intermittent desert springs, until he turned northwestward to the Old Tejon Pass into the San Joaquin Valley, looking for a route to Monterey. Garcés returned to the Colorado River by following the whole length of the Mohave Trail from the San Bernardino Valley, over the San Bernardino Mountains at Monument Peak, down the Mojave River and eastward to the Colorado River. This same trail was used by the first Americans to reach California by land, an expedition led by Jedediah Smith in November 1826. The Mojave desert section of the Mohave Trail is now a 4WD trail called the Mojave Road.

A route linking New Mexico to California, combining information from many earlier explorers, was opened in 1829–1830 when Santa Fe merchant Antonio Armijo led a trade party of 60 men and a caravan of mules to Alta California. Armijo's group blazed a trade route using a network of indigenous routes, and incorporated parts of Jedediah Smith's routes of 1826 and 1827 as well as Rafael Rivera's route of 1828 to the San Gabriel Mission through the Mojave Desert along the Mojave River. Armijo documented his route in a report to the governor, and this was published by the Mexican government in June 1830.

After this date, traders generally used the trail for a single, annual round trip. Word spread about Armijo's successful trade expedition, and some commerce began between Santa Fe and Los Angeles. However, in 1830, due to resumed hostilities with the Navajo, the portion of the Armijo route west to the Crossing of the Fathers on the Colorado River was no longer practical. A new route north of the river had to be found, which used trails blazed by the fur traders and trappers of New Mexico through the lands of the Ute. This route ran northwest to the Colorado and Green rivers, then crossed over to the Sevier River, which it followed until crossing westward over mountains to the vicinity of Parowan, Utah. From there it passed southward to the Santa Clara River, linking up with Armijo's route to California.

This commerce usually consisted of one mule pack train from Santa Fe with 20 to 200 members, with roughly twice as many mules, bringing New Mexican goods hand-woven by Indians, such as serapes and blankets, to California. California had many horses and mules, often running wild, but no local market for them; as such they were readily traded for hand-woven Indian products. Usually two blankets were traded for one horse; more blankets were usually required for a mule, which were considered hardier and therefore more valuable. California had almost no wool-processing industry and few weavers, so woven products were a welcome commodity. The trading party usually left New Mexico in early November to take advantage of winter rains to cross the deserts on the trail and would arrive in California in early February. The return party would usually leave California for New Mexico in early April to get over the trail before the water holes dried up and the melting snow raised the rivers too high. The return party often drove several hundred to a few thousand horses and mules.

Small-scale emigration from New Mexico to California used parts of the trail in the late 1830s when the fur trade began to decline. Many New Mexicans migrated to settle in Alta California by this route: some settled first in Politana, then established the twin settlements of Agua Mansa and La Placita on the Santa Ana River, the first towns in what later became San Bernardino and Riverside counties. The family of Antonio Armijo moved to Alta California, where his father acquired the Rancho Tolenas. A number of Americans, most naturalized Mexican citizens in New Mexico, and formerly working in the California trade over the Old Spanish Trail or in the fur trade, settled in Alta California. Several became influential residents in later years, including Louis Rubidoux, John A. Rowland, William Workman, Benjamin Davis Wilson, and William Wolfskill.

The trail was also used for illicit purposes. Some raiders attacked the California ranchos for horses and captives to sell in the extensive Indian slave trade. Mexicans, ex-trappers and Indian tribes, primarily the Utes, all participated in the horse raiding. With allies, Walkara was known to steal hundreds to thousands of horses in a single raid. Native Americans along the route were at risk of being taken captive, especially the women and children of the Paiute, who were sold as domestic servants to Mexican ranchers and other settlers in both California and New Mexico. Mexican traders and Indian raiding parties both participated in this slave trade. The consequences of this human trafficking had a long-standing effect for those who lived along the trail, even after the trail was no longer in use. Intermittent Indian warfare along the trail often resulted from such slave raids by unscrupulous traders and raiding Indians.

John C. Frémont, "The Great Pathfinder", was guided by Kit Carson along the Old Spanish Trail in 1844, and gave the trail its name in his report published in 1845. Trade between New Mexico and California continued until the mid-1850s, when a shift to the use of freight wagons and the development of wagon trails made the old pack trail route obsolete. By 1848 both New Mexico and California had been annexed as U.S. territories following its victory in the Mexican–American War of 1846–1848. After 1848 numerous Mormon immigrants began settling in Utah, Nevada, and California all along the trail, affecting both trade interests and tolerance for the slavery of American Natives.

Place names used in this article refer to present-day states and communities. Few (if any) settlements existed along the trail, except in the coastal plains of Alta California, before 1850, although many of the geologic features along the Trail retain their Spanish designations.

== Description of the trail route ==
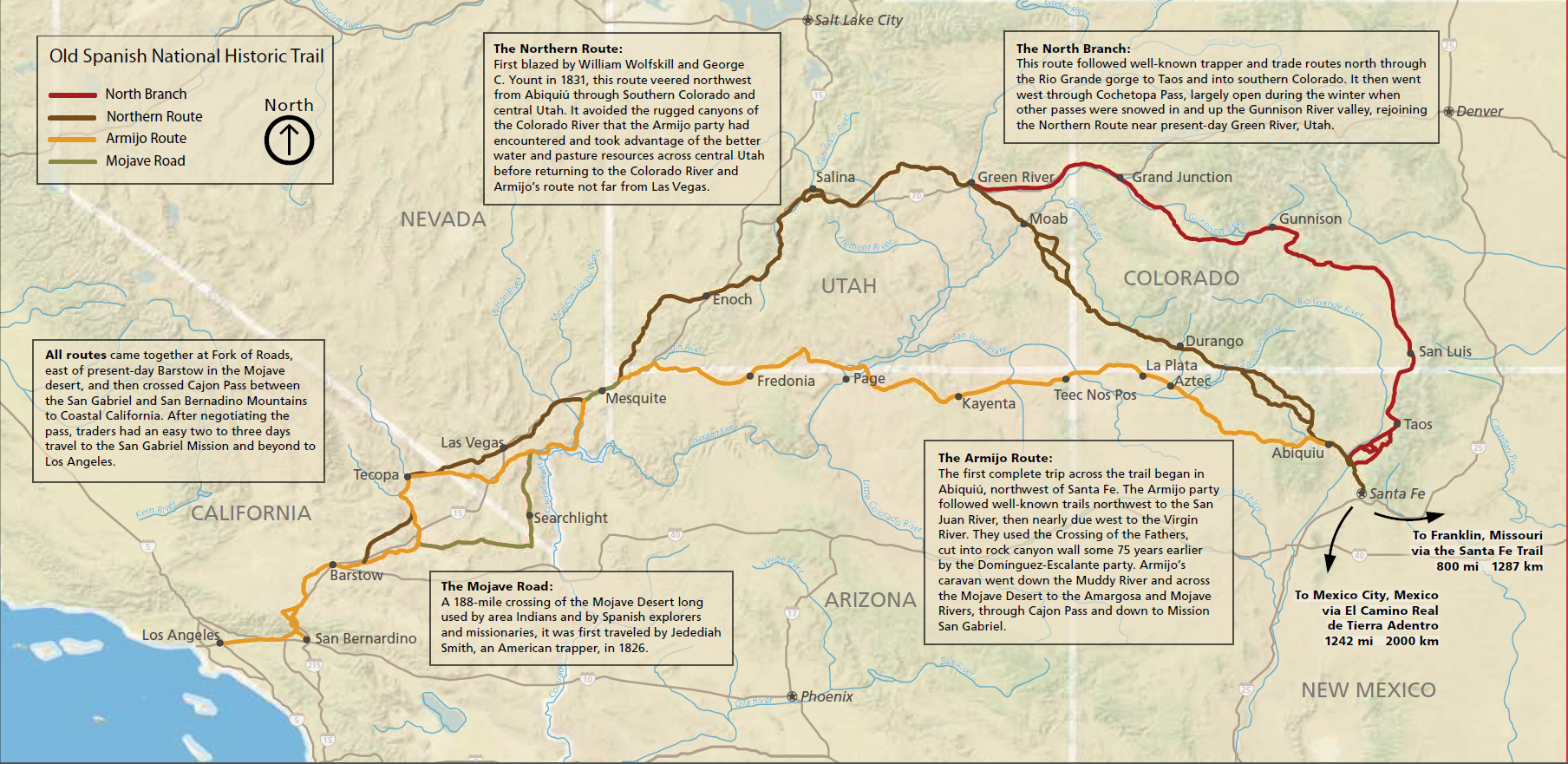
Old Spanish Trail Historic Routes (National Park Service)

=== Armijo Route ===
The Armijo Route of the Old Spanish Trail was established by an expedition led by merchant Antonio Armijo in 1829–1830. Leaving Abiquiú on November 7, 1829, Armijo's expedition traveled a route northwest and west of Santa Fe, following the Chama River and the Puerco River. He then crossed to the San Juan River basin and from there entered the Four Corners area, passing north of the Carrizo Mountains to Church Rock, east of present-day Kayenta. The trail ran to Marsh Pass and north through Tsegi Canyon into canyon country. At the Colorado River (then called the Rio Grande), the travelers forded at the Crossing of the Fathers above present-day Glen Canyon Dam.

Continuing west to Pipe Spring and on to Virgin River above present-day St. George, Utah, the expedition followed the Virgin to the mouth of the Santa Clara River, which they followed up to the vicinity of the Shivwits Reservation. They crossed southward over the Beaver Dam Mountains at Utah Hill Summit to the Virgin River again, which they followed for three days down to the Colorado River. They traveled west, parallel to the river, over difficult terrain in the Black Mountains (in order to avoid the deep narrow gorge of Boulder Canyon), to the riverside oases of Callville Wash and Las Vegas Wash. Armijo waited there for his scouts to return, especially Rivera, who had visited the Mohave villages downriver before. Rivera returned, having recognized the Mohave Trail that led westward to Southern California. Perhaps because the Mohave had been antagonistic to parties of mountain men in recent years, or to save time, Armijo attempted a shortcut route southwest to the mouth of the Mojave River.

From Las Vegas Wash on the Colorado River, Armijo's expedition passed southwestward to Eldorado Dry Lake in Eldorado Valley and the spring at Goodsprings Valley, then through Wilson Pass, across Mesquite Valley and California Valley, through what became known as Emigrant Pass to Resting Springs, then along the Amargosa River from near Tecopa to Salt Spring. From Salt Spring they crossed a two-day-long waterless stretch up Salt Creek to Laguna del Milagro ("Lake of the Miracle") (probably Silver Lake), then to Ojito del Malpais ("little spring of the badlands") on Soda Lake. They had another waterless day beyond Soda Lake, where they reached the Mojave River, only intermittently dependable for potable water, and the Mohave Trail leading upriver.

By then short of food, Armijo sent some of his scouts ahead to get more food in the settlement at San Bernardino de Sena Estancia. They followed the river for six days (110 miles to its head from the mouth), having to kill a mule or horse each day to eat. Probably at Summit Valley at the top of the river east of Cajon Pass, they met vaqueros of the San Bernardino de Sena Estancia who had extra food. Armijo did not cross over the mountains by the Mohave Trail route over Monument Peak, but followed a route he called "Cañon de San Bernardino" from the upper Mojave River west through Cajon Pass and down Crowder and Cajon canyons to the mouth of Cajon Pass, where the trail reached the coastal plain of San Bernardino Valley. This route was undoubtedly known to the vaqueros of San Bernardino de Sena Estancia.

Once through the pass, they turned west along the foot of the San Gabriel Mountains for two days to San Jose Creek; they followed it, crossing the San Gabriel River at the Rancho La Puente, and reaching Mission San Gabriel Arcángel on January 30, 1830. Armijo used the same route to return to his original town, traveling from March 1 to April 25, 1830.

He submitted a brief journal of his journey (itemizing the days with names of places where camps were made but not quantifying distances) to the government of New Mexico, and it was published by the Mexican government in June 1830.

=== Main Northern Route ===
The Main Route (also referred to as the Central Route or the Northern Route) of the Old Spanish Trail avoided territory of the Navajo, who had returned to a state of hostility after Armijo's trip, and the more difficult canyon country traversed by the Armijo Route around the Colorado River. First traveled in 1830 by a party led by William Wolfskill and George Yount, this route ran northwest from Santa Fe through southwestern Colorado, past the San Juan Mountains, Mancos, and Dove Creek, entering Utah near present-day Monticello. The trail proceeded north through difficult terrain to Spanish Valley near today's Moab, Utah, where a ferry crossed the deep and wide Colorado River and then turned northwest to a ferry crossing on the similarly sized and dangerous Green River near present-day Green River, Utah. The route then passed through (or around) the San Rafael Swell, the northernmost reach of the Trail. Entering the Great Basin in Utah via Salina Creek Canyon, the trail turned southwest following the Sevier, Santa Clara, and Virgin Rivers to the north bank of the Colorado River. There they could follow the Colorado River to Las Vegas Wash, then south through the Eldorado Valley and Piute Valley to join the Mojave Trail, west of the Mohave villages (below modern Laughlin) and follow the route between the springs along the Mojave Trail to Soda Lake and the Mojave River. Later caravans could alternatively follow the Armijo Route diverting southwestward from the Colorado at Las Vegas Wash, to Resting Springs and to the Mojave River where it joined the Wolfskill/Yount Route, following that river upward to and over the San Bernardino Mountains through Cajon Pass, Crowder Canyon and lower Cajon Canyon and across the coastal valleys to Mission San Gabriel and Los Angeles.

=== Northern Branch ===
The Northern Branch of the Old Spanish Trail was established by traders and trappers using Indian and Spanish colonial routes. It ran from Santa Fe north to Taos and on north into the San Luis Valley of Colorado. Caravans then headed west to present-day Saguache, crossing over the Continental Divide at Cochetopa Pass, and then through present-day Gunnison and Montrose to the Uncompahgre Valley. The trail then followed the Gunnison River to today's Grand Junction, where the Colorado River was forded, and then on west to join the Main Northern Route just east of the Green River. The North Branch was later of interest to explorers seeking viable routes for a transcontinental railroad along the 38th parallel. In 1853 alone, three separate expeditions explored the North Branch over Cochetopa Pass. These groups were led, in order, by Lieutenant Edward Fitzgerald Beale, Captain John Williams Gunnison, and John C. Frémont.

=== Modifications to the Trail before 1844 ===
Use of the Old Spanish Trail between 1829 and 1848 resulted in numerous variations as travelers adopted or blazed easier paths. But regardless of the route taken, the Old Spanish Trail crossed several mountain ranges, passed through dry sections with limited grass and sometimes limited water, crossed two deserts, and was often littered with the bones of horses that had died of thirst. The western portions of the Old Spanish Trail could only be used semi-reliably in winter when rains or snows deposited water in the desert. In summer, there was often no water and the oppressive heat could kill. A single round trip per year was about all that was feasible. After 1848, the western parts of the trail were used for winter access between Utah and California when other trails were closed by snow.

==== Lower Narrows Crossing – Cajon Pass Cutoff ====
Sometime before 1844, perhaps as early as 1830, a cut off developed on the Old Spanish Trail that cut the distance traveled along the upper Mojave River, by cutting across what is now Victor Valley, from the Cajon Pass to a crossing just below the Lower Narrows of the river. On April 20, 1844, following the advice of his guide, John C. Frémont intercepted this route to the river, riding east southeast from Lake Elizabeth, north of the San Gabriel Mountains.

==== Salt Spring – Fork of the Road Cutoff ====
Another cutoff to the Armijo route of the Old Spanish Trail had developed before 1844, where the trail forked northeastward from the Mojave River and Mohave Trail, east of what is now Yermo, California, running up Spanish Canyon over Alvord Mountain, to Bitter Spring, then through Red Pass to join the Armijo route near Salt Spring in the Silurian Valley. Frémont also used this route in 1844. The fork of the trails there on the Mojave River, later became known as Fork of the Road.

=== Frémont's Cutoff ===
One last modification to this route was that followed by John C. Frémont eastward in 1844. His expedition left the Armijo Route at Resting Spring and turned northeastward after crossing the Nopah Range through Emigrant Pass, through California Valley and across Pahrump Valley to Stump Spring and into the mountains to Mountain Springs, to Cottonwood Spring, to Las Vegas Springs. He then crossed the dry 50 miles to the Muddy River before rejoining the Main Route on the Virgin River at Halfway Wash after crossing what later became known as Mormon Mesa. This route saved the large distances caused by the diversion of the Armijo and Main routes to follow the Colorado River, and would later become the route of the Mormon Road, the wagon road through southern Nevada between Salt Lake City and Los Angeles.

== Historic preservation and commemoration ==
In 1988, a section of the trail in Arches National Park was placed on the National Register of Historic Places.

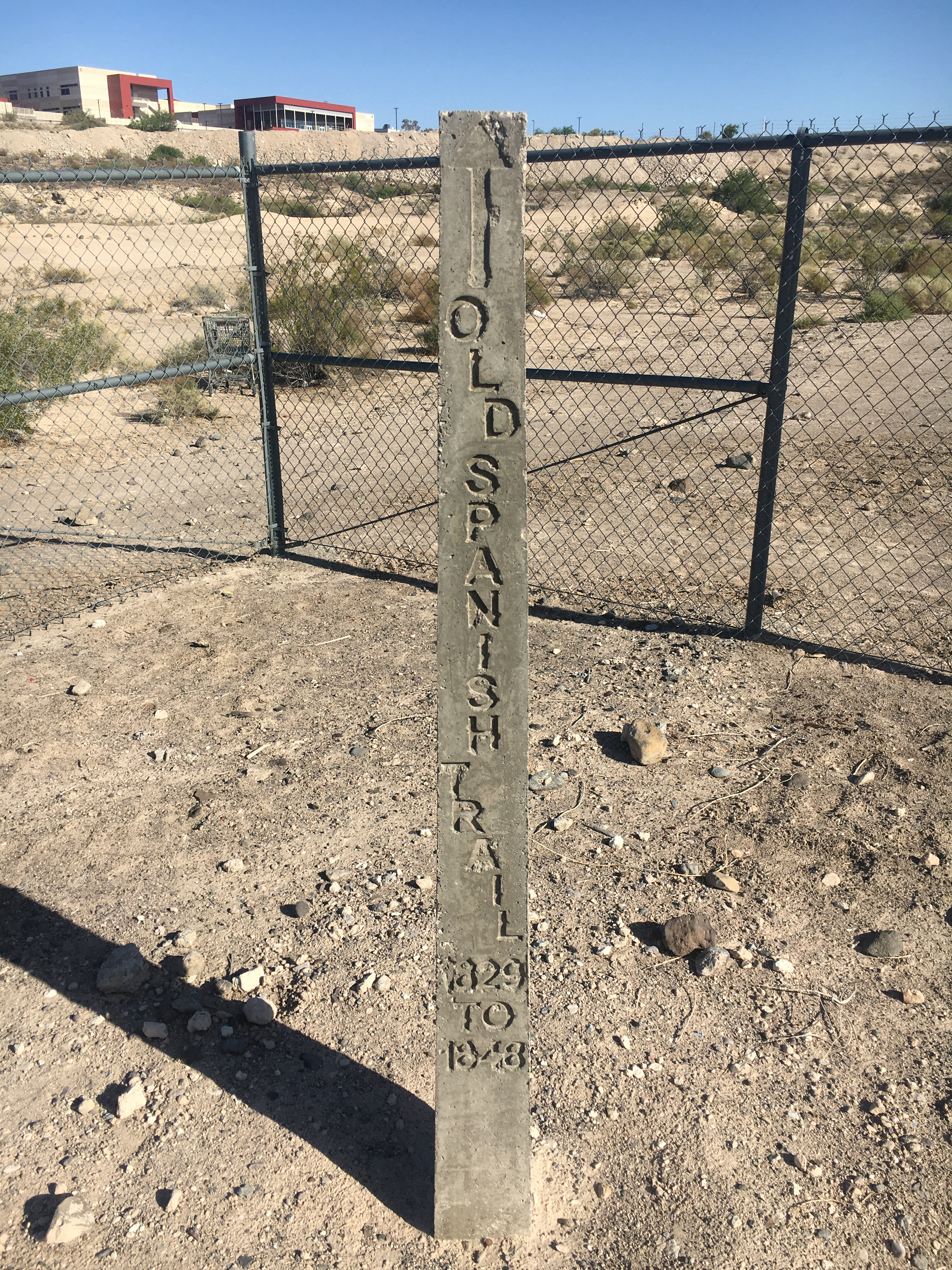
Old Spanish Trail Marker, Las Vegas, Nevada, near Whitney Mesa.

In 2001, the section of the Trail that runs across Nevada from the Arizona border to California was placed on the National Register of Historic Places as the Old Spanish Trail/Mormon Road Historic District.

Mojave National Preserve and Mojave Trails National Monument preserve sections of the trail traveling through the Mojave Desert in California.

The Old Spanish Trail became the fifteenth national historic trail after Congress adopted Senate Bill 1946 and President George W. Bush signed the legislation in December 2002.

Although few traces of the early traders' trail remain, the Trail is now commemorated in many local street and road names, and numerous historical markers in the states that it crossed. Portions of US 160 in Colorado and US 191 in Utah are similarly designated.

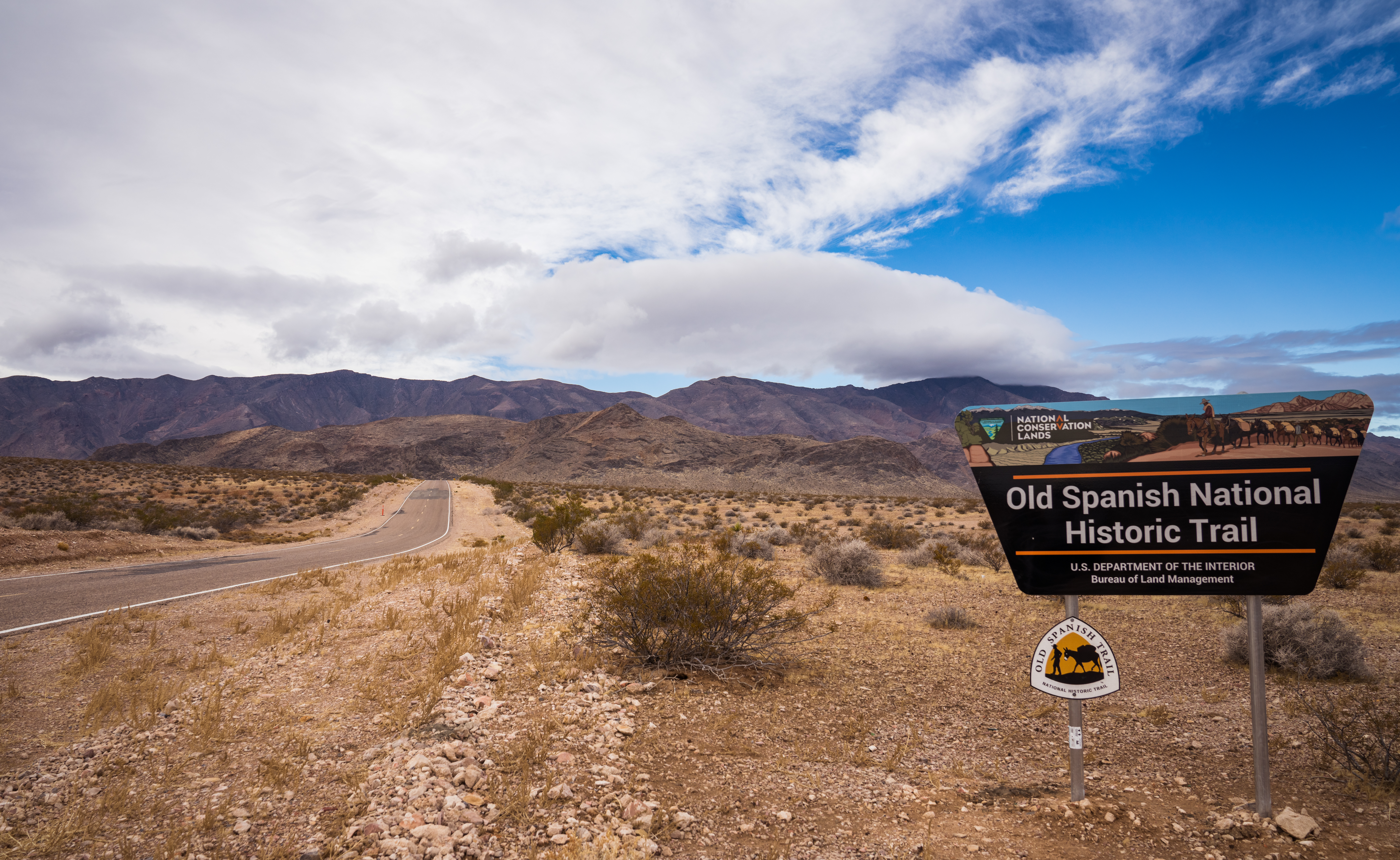
Modern sign marking the Old Spanish Historical Trail across Pahrump Valley on the California-Nevada border. South Nopah Range in background.

== See also ==
- NM: Colfax County Historic Places
- Pawnee Rock
  - Bent's Old Fort National Historic Site
  - Fort Larned National Historic Site
  - Fort Union National Monument
- Old Spanish Trail (auto trail)
- Santa Fe And Salt Lake Trail Monument in Cajon Pass, California
- Santa Fe Trail Historical Park in El Monte, California
- Santa Fe Trail Museum, part of the Trinidad History Museum
- Santa Fe Trail Remains
- Scenic byways in the United States
- Trailside Center museum in Kansas City, Missouri
- Tree in the Trail
