= California Wash (Nevada) =

Stream in Clark County, Nevada, US

California Wash is an arroyo tributary to the Muddy River, in Clark County, Nevada. Its mouth is at its confluence with the Muddy River over a mile southwest of Moapa and a mile and a half west of Glendale, Nevada.

Its source is at an elevation of 3320 feet at the southwestern end of the Muddy Mountains, at 36°17′14″N 114°48′09″W. From there it drains northeastward to its mouth on the Muddy River.

== History ==
California Wash was named for the California Crossing of the Muddy River at its mouth by the Mormon Road, and for the fact that the Mormon Road to California followed the wash from that crossing for many miles of the 52.6 mile water-less stretch of desert between the Muddy River and Las Vegas Wash.
