= Helendale, California =

Unincorporated community in California, United States

Helendale Silver Lakes
- Unincorporated community & census-designated place
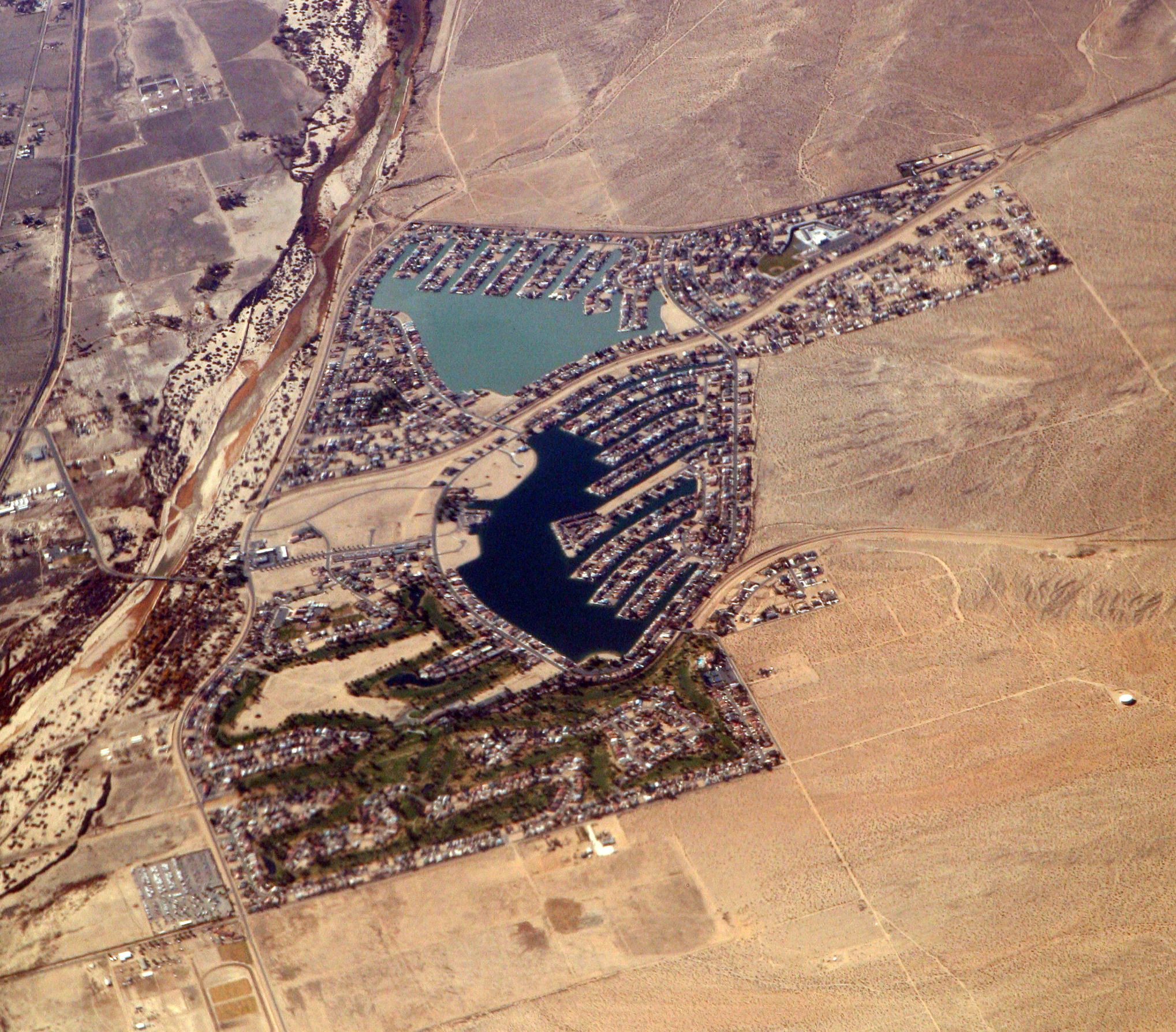
- Aerial view of Helendale, California

- Location in San Bernardino County and the state of California

- Location within the state of California Helendale (the United States)
- Coordinates: 34°44′38″N 117°19′28″W
- Country: United States
- State: California
- County: San Bernardino
- Elevation: 2,430 ft (740 m)

Population (2020)
  - Total: 6,317
- Time zone: UTC-8 (Pacific (PST))
  - Summer (DST): UTC-7 (PDT)
- ZIP codes: 92342
- Area code: 760

Helendale or Silver Lakes is an unincorporated community and census-designated place located in the Victor Valley of the Mojave Desert, within San Bernardino County, California.

It is on historic Route 66, west of the Mojave Freeway (I-15), between Barstow and Victorville. The name Helendale is used by the USPS, while Silver Lakes is used by the US Census. The 2020 United States census reported Silver Lakes's population was 6,317.

== History ==
Several Native American tribes lived in the area, namely the Mojave and Serrano. It is believed that the first White man to travel through was the Franciscan priest Francisco Garcés in 1776. He was exploring a route to the missions on the Coast following the Mojave River.

The original name for Helendale was Point of Rocks. There were several early trails and roadways through this area of the Mojave Desert, including the Mojave Trail, which was used by the Natives and Father Garcés, the Spanish Trail, the Santa Fe Trail, the Mormon Trail, etc.

After Father Garcés, Jedediah Smith traveled through the Point of Rocks area in 1826 on a fur trapping expedition. In 1844, John C. Frémont and his guide, Kit Carson, traveled through heading east via the Cajon Pass. During the Mexican–American War, in late 1846 or early 1847, the Mormon Battalion camped at Point of Rocks on their way to Los Angeles. They were released from the military shortly afterward and part of the battalion returned to Salt Lake City through Point of Rocks.

The first Mormon wagon train traveled through in about 1851. In 1857, Edward Fitzgerald Beale and his camel driver, Hi Jolly, brought a famous caravan through on the way to Wilmington for the Camel Corps. After a few horse ridden mail conveyance companies during the 1850s went out of business, the short-lived Pony Express began its service in the early 1860s and a stone station was built by the river at Point of Rocks. The stagecoach station at Point of Rocks was located west of where the railroad tracks were later put down. In about 1863, the station was burned by Paiute Indians of the Shoshone branch.

The Santa Fe Railroad arrived in the 1880s and built a Point of Rocks station, which provided a watering stop for the steam engine locomotives then moving trains across the High Desert. On December 15, 1897, the name was changed to Helen in honor of Helen A. Wells (born 1885), daughter of railroad executive Arthur G. Wells (1861–1932). On September 22, 1918, the name was changed to Helendale.

Route 66, or National Trails Highway, was paved and officially opened in the Helendale area in 1926. Helendale has a historical marker commemorating the old road that is located 100 yards south of the intersection of Route 66 and Vista Road. Nearby is the World War II Helendale Auxiliary Airfield.

In 1969, construction began on two manmade lakes, North Lake and South Lake, covering approximately 277 acres (1.12 km^{2}), and a resort community called Silver Lakes was built at Helendale that opened in the early 1970s. The ZIP Code is 92342 and the community is inside area code 760.

== Geography ==
According to the United States Census Bureau, the CDP covers an area of 5.6 square miles (14.4 km^{2}), 5.2 square miles (13.4 km^{2}) of it land, and 0.4 square miles (1.0 km^{2}) of it (7.15%) water.

Helendale is located in a generally flat area in the Mojave Desert, between Victorville and Barstow. It is located 100 miles (160 km) northeast of Los Angeles and 180 miles (290 km) southwest of Las Vegas at an elevation of 2,464 feet (751 m).

The town consists primarily of the Silver Lakes resort community, which is built around two manmade lakes. Water for these lakes comes from Mojave River, which, while dry at the surface, has flow underground.

== Climate ==
Helendale is in a desert climate. Like most of the Mojave Desert, it has cool winters and hot summers and very little rainfall. It often will remain dry while nearby Victorville and Barstow are experiencing flash floods. For this reason, natives called the area "The hole in the sky."

Climate data for Helendale, California
Month	Jan	Feb	Mar	Apr	May	Jun	Jul	Aug	Sep	Oct	Nov	Dec	Year
Record high °F (°C)	80 (27)	87 (31)	93 (34)	100 (38)	108 (42)	111 (44)	116 (47)	112 (44)	113 (45)	101 (38)	88 (31)	85 (29)	116 (47)
Mean daily maximum °F (°C)	60 (16)	63 (17)	69 (21)	75 (24)	85 (29)	94 (34)	99 (37)	99 (37)	93 (34)	81 (27)	69 (21)	60 (16)	79 (26)
Mean daily minimum °F (°C)	32 (0)	35 (2)	39 (4)	44 (7)	50 (10)	56 (13)	62 (17)	62 (17)	56 (13)	46 (8)	37 (3)	31 (−1)	46 (8)
Record low °F (°C)	−1 (−18)	11 (−12)	14 (−10)	25 (−4)	30 (−1)	36 (2)	35 (2)	42 (6)	32 (0)	21 (−6)	8 (−13)	6 (−14)	−1 (−18)
Average precipitation inches (mm)	1.1 (28)	1.3 (33)	0.9 (23)	0.3 (7.6)	0.1 (2.5)	0.1 (2.5)	0.2 (5.1)	0.2 (5.1)	0.2 (5.1)	0.4 (10)	0.5 (13)	1.0 (25)	6.3 (159.9)
Source: Weather Channel

== Public Safety and Government ==
Law enforcement is provided by the San Bernardino County Sheriff's Department out of the Adelanto Station. Traffic enforcement is provided by the California Highway Patrol. The San Bernardino County Fire Department maintains a full-time station with paramedics near the Post Office on Helendale Road. Private security firms are hired by the Silverlakes Association and consistently patrol the amenities of Silver Lakes.

Water, Parks, solid waste, sewer, and street lighting is provided by the Helendale Community Services District

== Demographics ==
Historical population
Census	Pop.	Note	%±
2010	5,623		—
2020	6,317		12.3%
U.S. Decennial Census; 1850–1870 1880-1890; 1900 1910 1920; 1930 1940 1950; 1960 1970 1980; 1990 2000 2010

Silver Lakes first appeared as a census designated place in the 2010 U.S. census.

The 2020 United States census reported that Silver Lakes had a population of 6,317. The population density was 1,206.5 inhabitants per square mile (465.8/km^{2}). The racial makeup of Silver Lakes was 63.7% White, 6.9% African American, 1.0% Native American, 4.9% Asian, 0.4% Pacific Islander, 9.9% from other races, and 13.2% from two or more races. Hispanic or Latino of any race were 26.8% of the population.

The whole population lived in households. There were 2,478 households, out of which 28.2% included children under the age of 18, 54.9% were married-couple households, 5.6% were cohabiting couple households, 21.7% had a female householder with no partner present, and 17.8% had a male householder with no partner present. 24.5% of households were one person, and 13.3% were one person aged 65 or older. The average household size was 2.55. There were 1,775 families (71.6% of all households).

The age distribution was 22.4% under the age of 18, 6.1% aged 18 to 24, 22.1% aged 25 to 44, 26.3% aged 45 to 64, and 23.2% who were 65 years of age or older. The median age was 44.6 years. For every 100 females, there were 100.2 males.

There were 2,782 housing units at an average density of 531.3 units per square mile (205.1 units/km^{2}), of which 2,478 (89.1%) were occupied. Of these, 77.3% were owner-occupied, and 22.7% were occupied by renters.

In 2023, the US Census Bureau estimated that the median household income was $111,857, and the per capita income was $60,043. About 3.9% of families and 3.2% of the population were below the poverty line.

== Places of interest ==
- Cottonwood Park
- Silver Lakes Country Club
- South Lake Park
- Desert Fox airsoft field
- Elmer's Bottle Tree Ranch
- Caroli Lake Club

== Education ==
It is in the Helendale Elementary School District and the Victor Valley Union High School District.
