= Silver Mountain (San Bernardino County, California) =

Mountain in San Bernardino County, California

Highest point
- Elevation: 1,270 m (4,170 ft)
- Coordinates: 34°39′05″N 117°16′01″W

Silver Mountain is a summit that is located east of La Delta in San Bernardino County in the US state of California. It rises to an elevation of 4,170 feet (1,270 meters). It is located near Victorville and Apple Valley.

== History ==
In January 1873, the San Bernardino Guardian had reported that near Lane's Ranch, a strike on Silver Mountain at what became the Oro Grande Mine, ore that ran $160 in gold and $18 in silver per ton. This led to the organization of the Silver Mountain Mining District.
