= Parowan Valley =

Valley in Utah, United States

- Little Salt Lake Valley
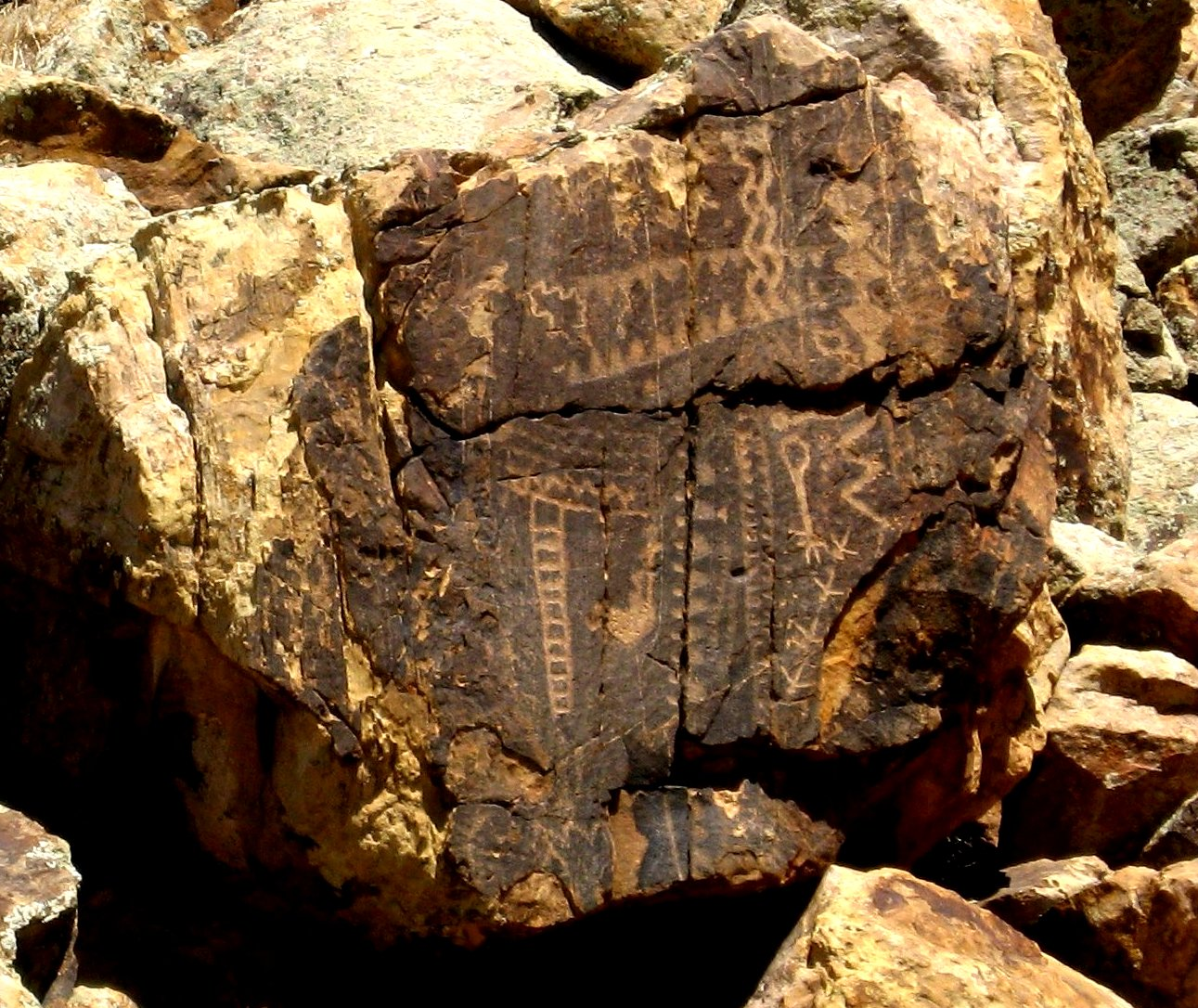
- Fremont culture petroglyphs in Parowan Gap

- Location within Utah Location within the United States
- Floor elevation: 5,682 ft (1,732 m)
- Length: 26 mi (42 km)
- Width: 6.5 mi (10.5 km)
- Area: 140 sq mi (360 km^{2})
- Depth: 1,680 ft (510 m)

Geography
- Location: Iron County, Utah; United States
- Coordinates: 37°56′28″N 112°48′14″W
- Interactive map of Parowan Valley

Parowan Valley, originally known as the Little Salt Lake Valley, is a basin in Iron County, Utah, United States.

== Description ==
Its lowest point is at 5,695 feet (1,736 m) in the Little Salt Lake.

Fremont Wash, Red Creek, Parowan Creek and other tributaries all drain into the Little Salt Lake. In times that the lake overflows it is drained through the Parowan Gap that passes through the Red Hills into Jackrabbit Wash, in Cedar Valley.

== See also ==
- List of valleys of Utah
