= Halfway Wash (Nevada) =

Stream in Clark and Lincoln County, Nevada, U.S.

Halfway Wash, is a stream in Clark County and Lincoln County, Nevada. Its mouth is at its confluence with the Virgin River at an elevation of 1,306 feet (398 m). Its source is at an elevation of 3,560 feet (1,090 m), on the south slope of Davidson Peak at 36°53′09″N 114°19′32″W in Lincoln County, Nevada.
