= Lower Narrows (Mojave River) =

Coordinates: 34°34′24″N 117°19′08″W

Lower Narrows of the Mojave River, is a narrow gap the Mojave River passes through at Mojave Heights in San Bernardino County, California. It lies at an elevation of 2,746 feet (837 meters).
