= Antonio Armijo =

Mexican explorer and merchant

Antonio Mariano Armijo (1804–1850) was a New Mexican explorer and merchant who is famous for leading the first commercial caravan party between Abiquiú, Nuevo México and San Gabriel Mission, Alta California in 1829–1830. His route, the southernmost and most direct, is known as the Armijo Route of the Old Spanish Trail. His route helped to establish the furthest West trading post of Nuevo México for Santa Fe, on the Mormon Road at the old adobe fort, in what became Las Vegas, Nevada.

Abiquiú was the starting point and eastern terminus of the original route of the Old Spanish Trail. Though segments of an overland route between the Spanish colonies of Nuevo México and Alta California had been blazed decades earlier, Armijo was the first to pioneer a complete route that traveled the entire length. Armijo traveled with sixty mounted men and a caravan of pack animals carrying blankets and other trade goods to barter for mules in California. The caravan left Abiquiú on 7 November 1829 and made the journey to the San Gabriel Mission in what is now San Gabriel, California in eighty-six days, arriving on 31 January 1830. He returned by the same route in 56 days, leaving 1 March and arriving on 25 April 1830. Unlike the other routes of the Old Spanish Trail, Armijo's route was documented day by day, although in a very brief report listing dates and stopping places. The trail was documented by those on expedition, including his scout Raphael Rivera who recorded the location of Las Vegas Springs. The report was submitted to the governor of Nuevo México, José Antonio Cháves, and published by the Mexican government on 19 June 1830.
