= California Valley (Inyo County) =

Valley in Inyo County, California, United States

- Location within California
- Floor elevation: 787 m (2,582 ft)
- Length: 14 m (46 ft) North to South
- Width: 5 m (16 ft)

Geography
- Location: California
- Coordinates: 35°53′29″N 116°01′02″W
- Topo map: Tecopa Pass, Horse Thief Springs, North of Tecopa Pass, Calvada Springs
- Interactive map of California Valley

California Valley is a valley in Inyo County, California. It has an elevation of 2582 feet. It lies between the Nopah Range (to the west and north) and the Kingston Range (to the east and south).
