= Holden, Utah =

Town in the state of Utah, United States

- Town
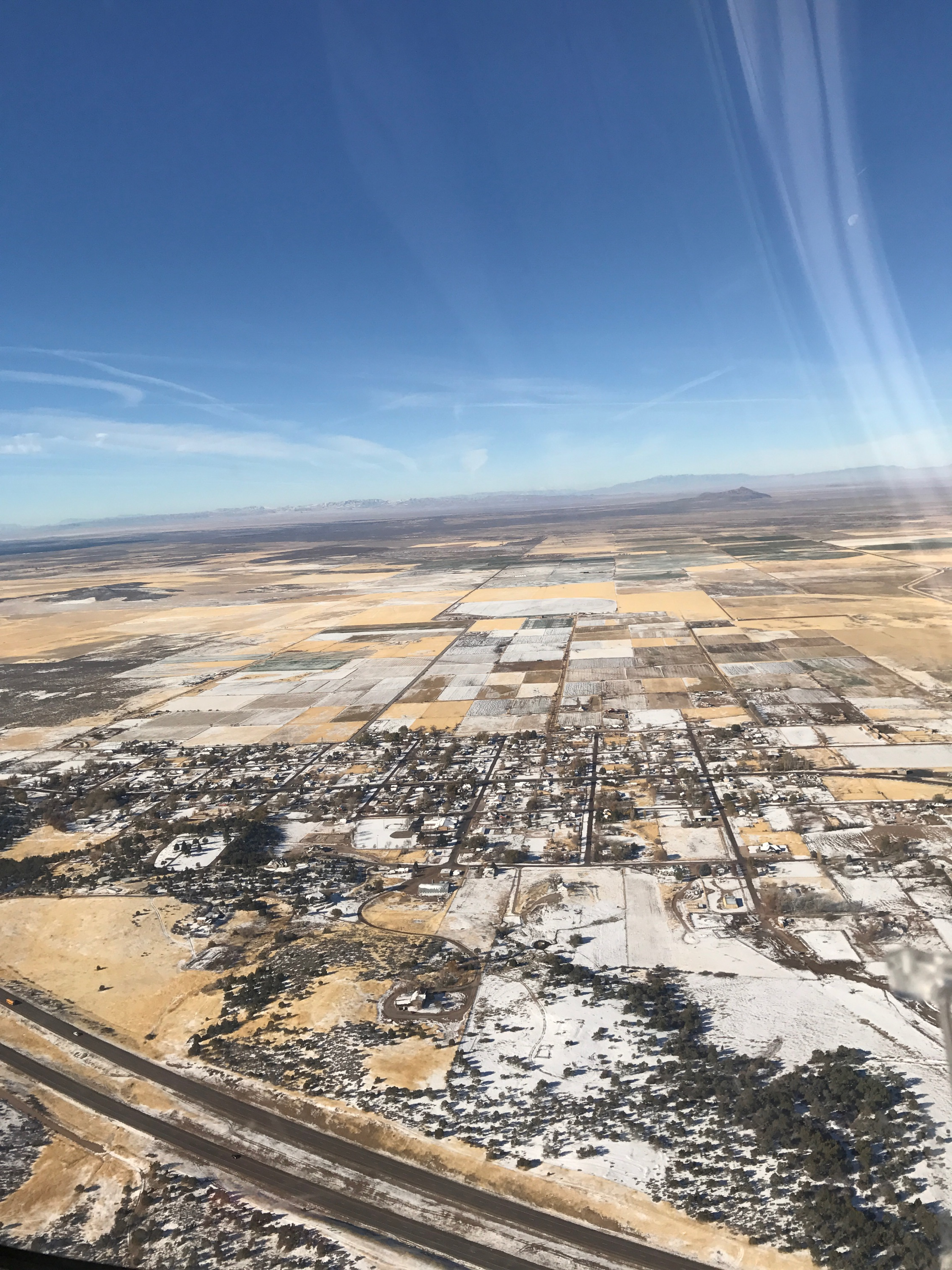
- Aerial view of Holden, with Interstate 15 in bottom left, November 2015

- Location in Millard County and the state of Utah.
- Coordinates: 39°06′00″N 112°16′13″W
- Country: United States
- State: Utah
- County: Millard
- Settled: 1855
- Incorporated: 1923
- Named for: Elijah E. Holden

Area
  - Total: 0.54 sq mi (1.39 km^{2})
  - Land: 0.54 sq mi (1.39 km^{2})
  - Water: 0 sq mi (0.00 km^{2})
- Elevation: 5,112 ft (1,558 m)

Population (2020)
  - Total: 438
  - Density: 734.0/sq mi (283.41/km^{2})
- Time zone: UTC-7 (Mountain (MST))
  - Summer (DST): UTC-6 (MDT)
- ZIP code: 84636
- Area code: 435
- FIPS code: 49-35960
- GNIS feature ID: 2412760
- Website: www.holdenutah.us

Holden is a town in Millard County, Utah, United States. The population was 438 at the 2020 census.

== History ==
Holden was settled in 1855 by a group of ten families sent out by the bishop of the local congregation of The Church of Jesus Christ of Latter-day Saints in Fillmore. Named Cedar Springs for the springs in the junipers that the community was built around. The town then assumed the name Buttermilk Fort because travelers passing through were encouraged to stop for a glass of cold buttermilk while resting. The town got its post office in 1864, and the town was renamed for Elijah E. Holden, a member of the Mormon Battalion who was one of the first settlers of Holden and died while caught in a snowstorm in 1858.

== Geography ==
According to the United States Census Bureau, the town has a total area of 0.6 square mile (1.4 km^{2}), all land.

== Demographics ==
Historical population
Census	Pop.	Note	%±
1870	266		—
1880	355		33.5%
1890	363		2.3%
1900	472		30.0%
1910	553		17.2%
1920	642		16.1%
1930	485		−24.5%
1940	500		3.1%
1950	476		−4.8%
1960	388		−18.5%
1970	351		−9.5%
1980	364		3.7%
1990	402		10.4%
2000	400		−0.5%
2010	378		−5.5%
2020	438		15.9%
U.S. Decennial Census

As of the census of 2000, there were 400 people, 140 households, and 105 families residing in the town. The population density was 728.7 people per square mile (280.8/km^{2}). There were 162 housing units at an average density of 295.1 per square mile (113.7/km^{2}). The racial makeup of the town was 99.50% White, and 0.50% from two or more races. Hispanic or Latino of any race were 1.00% of the population.

There were 140 households, out of which 40.0% had children under 18 living with them, 65.0% were married couples living together, 10.0% had a female householder with no husband present, and 25.0% were non-families. 24.3% of all households were made up of individuals, and 17.1% had someone living alone who was 65 years of age or older. The average household size was 2.86, and the average family size was 3.47.

In the town, the population was spread out, with 34.0% under 18, 6.3% from 18 to 24, 20.0% from 25 to 44, 22.5% from 45 to 64, and 17.3% who were 65 years of age or older. The median age was 36 years. For every 100 females, there were 91.4 males. For every 100 females aged 18 and over, there were 83.3 males.

The median income for a household in the town was $34,000, and the median income for a family was $42,083. Males had a median income of $43,571 versus $16,250 for females. The per capita income for the town was $14,024. About 5.5% of families and 7.9% of the population were below the poverty line, including 8.5% of those under age 18 and 6.9% of those aged 65 or over.

== Economy ==
The traditional economy has been agriculture. Before the freeway, I-15, bypassed the town, there were five gas stations, a grocery store, a cafe, a swimming pool, an open-air dance hall, and a show house. Those businesses are now gone. Now there is a dental office with two dentists, a UPS transfer station where packages are delivered throughout Millard County, a nursery that grows native plants, three beauticians, a cabinet shop, a realty business, and several home businesses featuring craft items. Cattle, alfalfa hay, and corn are the main agricultural products. Most of the farms are located outside of the city limits, but they are owned and operated by farmers and ranchers that live in Holden.

Primary employers in the area are Intermountain Community Hospital, Intermountain Power Project (IPP), Brush Wellman, Sunrise Engineering, the Great Lake Cheese Company of Utah, Mountain View Mushrooms, and the Kern River Gas Transmission.

== See also ==
- List of cities and towns in Utah
