= Chicken Creek (Sevier River tributary) =

Chicken Creek is a tributary stream of the Sevier River, in Juab and Sanpete counties of Utah. Its mouth joins the river in Juab County at an elevation of 5,276 feet (1,608 m) at 39°28′43″N 112°02′13″W. Its source is at an elevation of 7,810 feet (2,380 m) at 39°28′12″N 111°42′26″W in the San Pitch Mountains just over the county line in Sanpete County.

== See also ==
- List of rivers of Utah
