= Muley Point (Iron County, Utah) =

Coordinates: 38.0764°N 112.6844°W

Muley Point is a cliff in Iron County, Utah. It rises to an elevation of 6,010 feet (1,830 meters). It overlooks the northern end of the Parowan Valley, where Fremont Wash enters it.
