= Mormon Mesa =

Mesa in Clark County, Nevada

Coordinates: 36°30′44″N 114°22′33″W

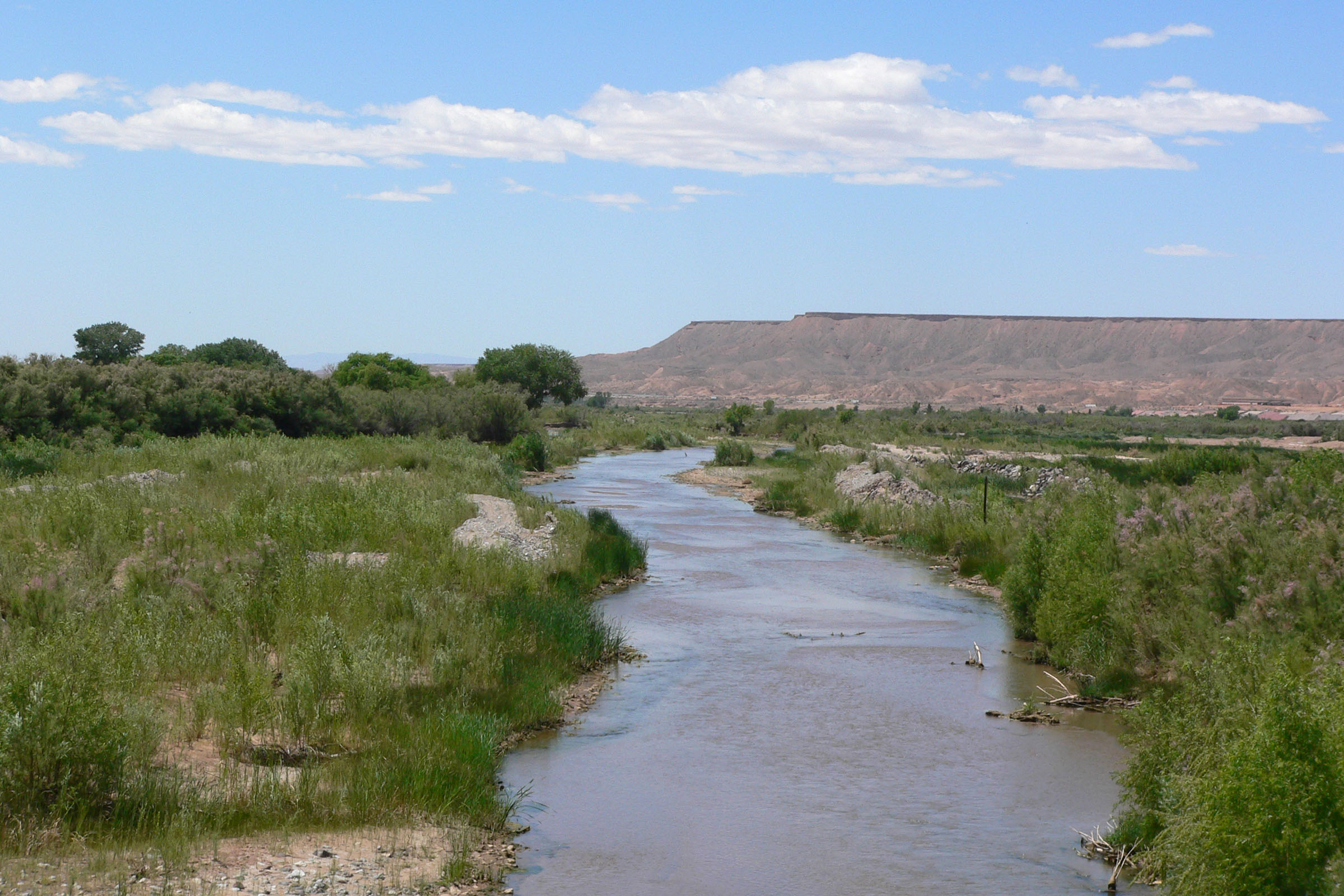
View of Mormon Mesa from the banks of the Virgin River

Mormon Mesa is a mesa between the Muddy River and the Virgin River in Clark County, southern Nevada. It extends northward from the confluence of these rivers to the foot of the Mormon Mountains and East Mormon Mountains, rising to a height of 1,893 feet (577 meters).

== Mormon Mesa Area of Critical Environmental Concern ==
The 149,000-acre (60,000 ha) Mormon Mesa Desert Tortoise Area of Critical Environmental Concern (ACEC) protects the habitat of the desert tortoise, an endangered species. The Delamar Mountains Wilderness Area encompasses a portion of the ACEC. The area is composed primarily of creosote-bursage scrub and mixed Mojave shrub plant communities.

== Double Negative by Michael Heizer ==
Double Negative, a piece of land art created by renowned contemporary artist Michael Heizer in 1969, is located on the eastern edge of Mormon Mesa. It is owned by the Los Angeles Museum of Contemporary Art and is accessible to the public.

== See also ==
- Flora of the Great Basin
- Natural history of the Mojave Desert
