= Resting Springs =

Water source in Inyo County, California

Coordinates: 35°52′39″N 116°09′26″W

Resting Springs are historical springs in Inyo County, California East of Tecopa. They lie at an elevation of 1,762 feet/537 meters, at the southern end of the Resting Spring Range in the Chicago Valley.
