= Las Vegas Springs =

- U.S. National Register of Historic Places
- Nevada Historical Marker No. 40
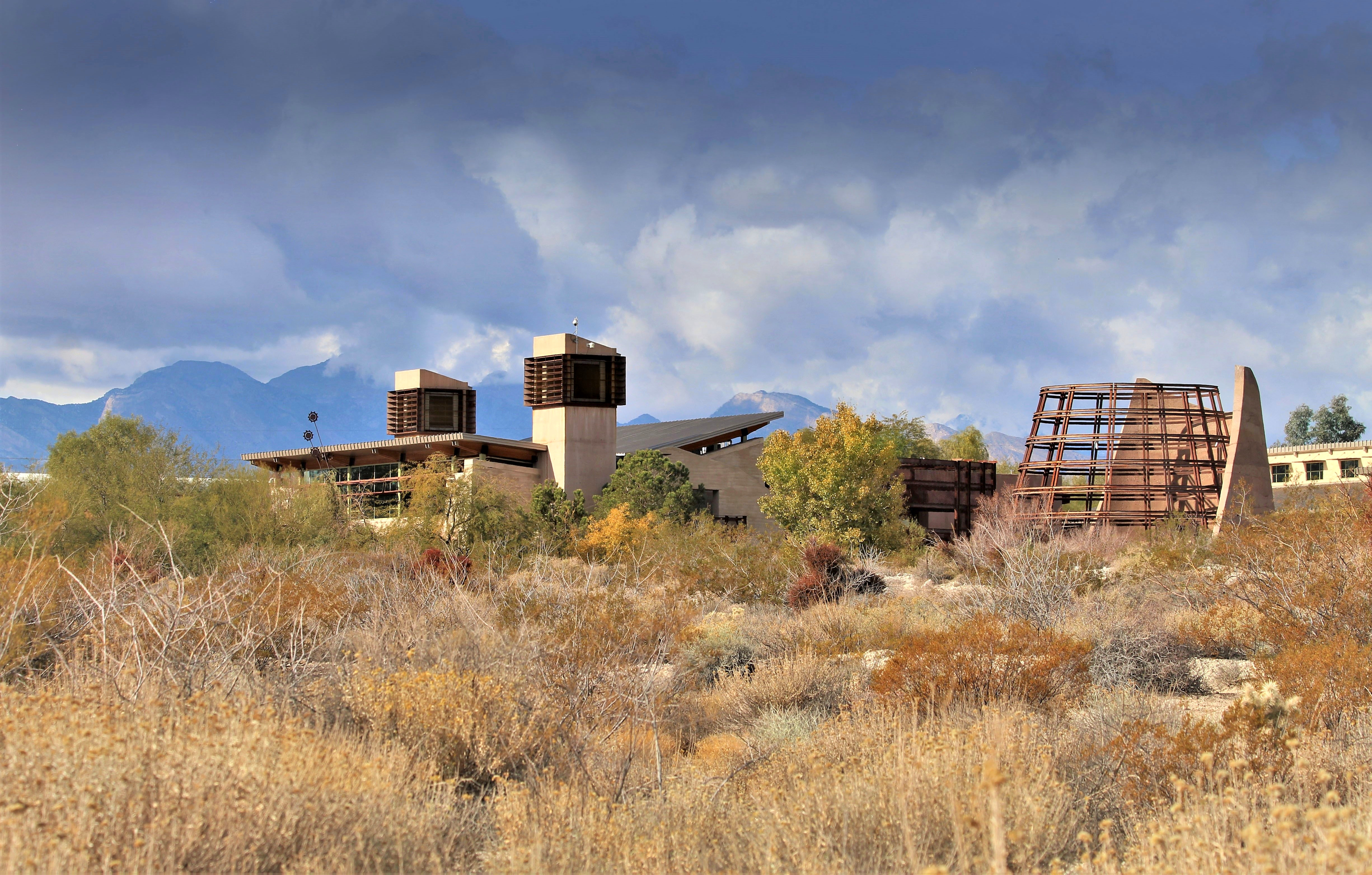
- Springs Preserve with the Desert Living Center rotunda on the right
- Location: Las Vegas, Nevada
- Coordinates: 36°10′22″N 115°11′22″W
- NRHP reference No.: 78001719
- Marker No.: 40
- Added to NRHP: December 14, 1978

The Las Vegas Springs or Big Springs is the site of a natural oasis, known traditionally as a cienega. For more than 15,000 years, springs broke through the desert floor, creating grassy meadows (called las vegas by Spanish New-Mexican explorers). The bubbling springs were a source of water for Native Americans living here at least 5,000 years ago. Known as The Birthplace of Las Vegas it sustained travelers of the Old Spanish Trail and Mormons who came to settle the West. The springs' source is the Las Vegas aquifer.

The springs are now a part of the Las Vegas Springs Preserve.

Las Vegas Springs was once the site of three springs, running into two large pools of water. It is a site historically known for a gathering of pioneers and Native Americans and early settlers in the Las Vegas Valley. In 1905, it provided the water source to the budding town and railroad. Once pipe lines were laid and wells were drilled, the water table dropped, and the springs stopped flowing to the surface in 1962. The site is currently undergoing rehabilitation to protect what remains architecturally and archaeologically.

Now, it is 180 acres of historic land located just west of Downtown Las Vegas. It is open to the public.

== History ==
The first non-Native American crossing Las Vegas Springs was Raphael Rivera in 1829. He was the Mexican scout for the expedition of Antonio Armijo who pioneered the Old Spanish Trail between New Mexico and California. Later, American traveler John C. Fremont and Kit Carson camped at the springs in 1844. The springs stopped flowing to the surface in 1962 as the water table dropped as more water was pumped out to meet the demands of a growing population than was being replaced by rainfall and snow melt.

Uncontrolled use of private wells and wasted water contributed to the early depletion of the aquifer. This forced the Las Vegas Land and Water Company to drill 'Well No. 1' in 1923 to supply the demands for water.

The springs and associated infrastructure have been listed on the National Register of Historic Places since 1978 and are marked as Nevada Historical Marker 40.

== See also ==
- Old Las Vegas Mormon Fort State Historic Park

Preceded by 39 Panaca	Nevada Historical Markers; 40 Las Vegas (The Meadows)	Succeeded by 41 Pueblo Grande de Nevada
