= Fremont Wash =

Valley in Iron County, Utah, United States

Fremont Wash sometimes called Fremont Canyon in its upper reach, is a stream and a valley in the north end of Parowan Valley, in Iron County, Utah. Its mouth lies at its confluence with Little Salt Lake at an elevation of 5,686 feet (1,733 meters). Its head is found at 38°07′46″N 112°34′36″W, the mouth of Fremont Canyon, an elevation of 6,476 feet (1,974 meters).

== History ==
Fremont Wash was originally known as North Canyon Creek for the North Canyon from which it issued into the Parowan Valley at Muley Point. North Canyon consisted of what is now Fremont Canyon and the valley of Fremont Wash between the Black Mountains and Hurricane Cliffs to Muley Point.

On the Mormon Road, the camp on North Canyon Creek, given the mileage recorded by Addison Pratt, was 27.5 miles south of the ford on the Beaver River. Captain Marcy's Prairie Traveler said it was in "... Little Salt Lake Valley, Good grass; no wood." That would put it near Wheatgrass, Utah just above the Little Salt Lake.
