= Cajon Canyon =

Valley in San Bernardino County, California

Cajon Canyon, originally named El Cajon De San Gabriel De Amuscopiabit, El Cajon in Spanish meaning "the box" in English, is a long valley ending in a box canyon in the northeastern San Gabriel Mountains, within San Bernardino County, California.

== Geography ==
The steep slopes around the edges of the box canyon section in its upper reaches, making it difficult to enter and leave it, led to its acquiring this name Cajon.

Its mouth lies at an elevation of 1,991 feet (607 m), in Cajon Pass near Cajon Junction. Its head is to the west, at 34°23′02″N 117°34′37″W at an elevation of 4,910 feet (1,500 m), and less than 1/2 mile south of Mountain Top Junction where the Angeles Crest Highway intersects California State Highway 138.

California State Route 138 runs through the length of the valley, between Interstate 15 and Angeles Crest Highway.

== See also ==
- San Gabriel Mountains topics
- Valleys of San Bernardino County, California
