= Mojave Road (Los Angeles) =

California Historic Landmark

Mojave Road Los Angeles
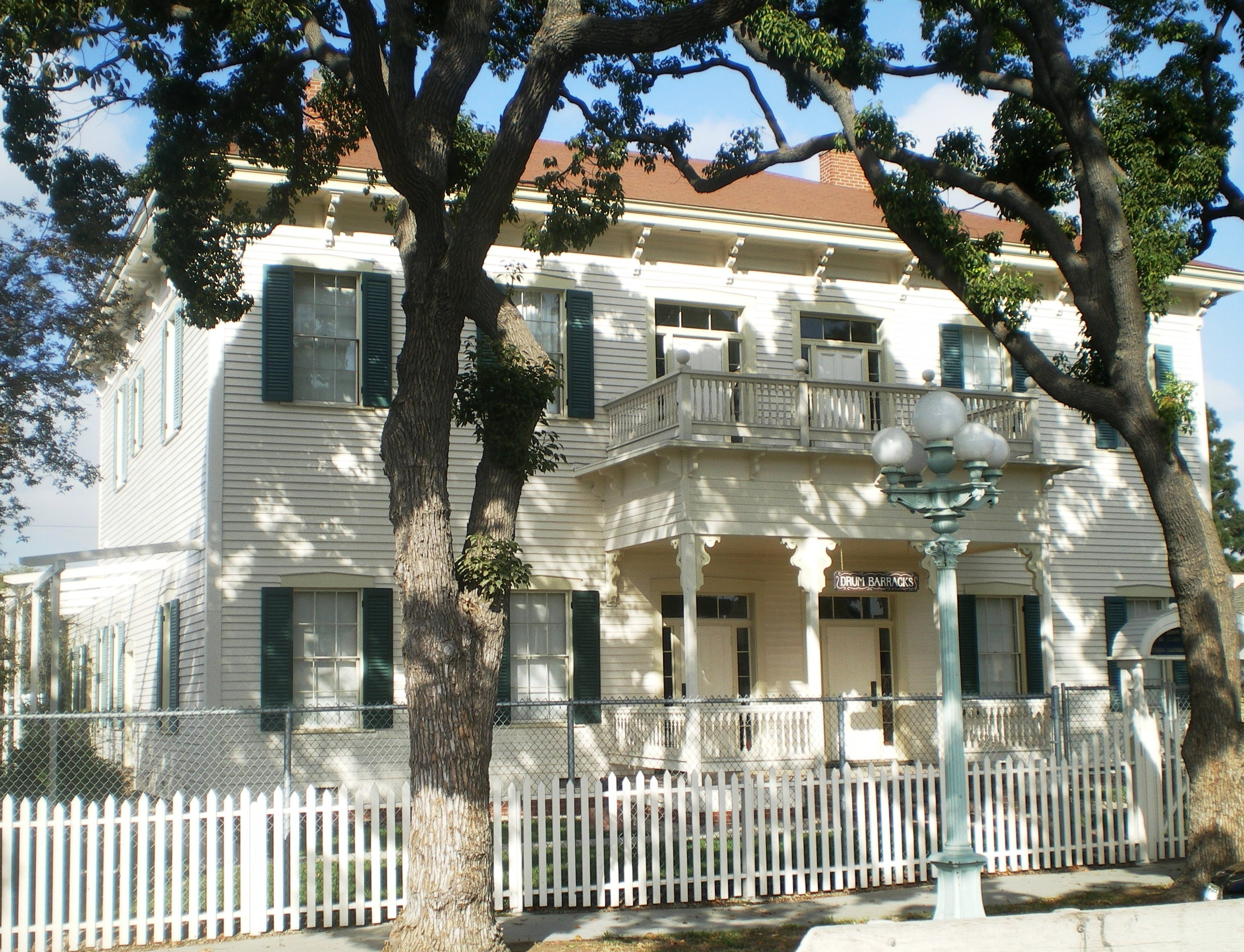
- Officers' quarters of Drum Barracks, the west end of the Mojave Road Los Angeles

- Location within the Los Angeles metropolitan area
- 33°47′05″N 118°15′29″W
- Location: Wilmington, California to the Colorado River.

History
- Built: Prehistory

California Historical Landmark
- Designated: March 19, 1985
- Reference no.: 963

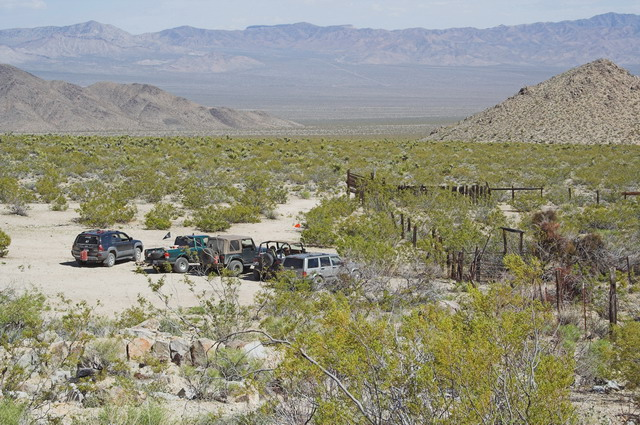
Vehicles traveling the Mojave Road stop for a break at Marl Springs

The Mojave Road Los Angeles was designated a California Historic Landmark (No. 963) on March 19, 1985. It runs from Drum Barracks in Los Angeles County to the Colorado River in San Bernardino County, California.

The Drum Barracks, also known as Camp Drum and the Drum Barracks Civil War Museum, is the last remaining original American Civil War era military facility in the Los Angeles area. Located in the Wilmington section of Los Angeles, near the Port of Los Angeles, it has been designated as a California Historical Landmark and a Los Angeles Historic Cultural Monument, and is listed on the National Register of Historic Places. Since 1987, it has been operated as a Civil War museum that is open to the public. At the start of the American Civil War in April 1861, there were concerns on the Union side about the loyalty and security of the Los Angeles area. Many of the area's residents were recent arrivals from the Southern states, and southerner John C. Breckinridge received twice as many local votes as Abraham Lincoln in the 1860 Presidential election. A company of secessionists was also holding public drills in El Monte, California, displaying California's Bear flag instead of the Stars and Stripes.

The Mojave Road, also known as Old Government Road (formerly the Mohave Trail), is a historic route and present day dirt road across what is now the Mojave National Preserve in the Mojave Desert in the United States. This rough road stretched 147 miles (237 km) from Beale's Crossing (the river crossing site on the west bank of the Colorado River, opposite old Fort Mohave, roughly 10 miles (16 km) southwest of Bullhead City, Arizona), to Fork of the Road location along the north bank of the Mojave River where the old Mojave Road split off from the route of the Old Spanish Trail/Mormon Road.

A traditional thoroughfare of desert-dwelling Native Americans, the Mohave Trail much later served Spanish missionaries, explorers, and foreign colonizers and settlers from the 18th to 19th centuries who called it the Mojave Trail, and ran between watering holes across the Mojave Desert between the Colorado River and Mojave River then following it to the Cajon Pass, the gap between the San Bernardino Mountains and San Gabriel Mountains, into Southern California ending at Drum Barracks. The watering holes recur at intervals of about 60 miles (97 km) to 70 miles (110 km).

Francisco Garcés, the Spanish Franciscan missionary, traveled the trail with Mohave guides, after leaving the expedition of Juan Bautista de Anza in 1776. José María de Zalvidea, the zealous Franciscan administrator of Mission San Gabriel also crossed the trail in 1806, reportedly converting five indigenous Mohaves near present-day Hesperia.

Today a four-wheel drive vehicle is required for all but a few short stretches of this desert road, which is unmaintained. The old road from Fork of the Road eastward along the Mojave River is interrupted after 10.9 acres (4.4 ha) by private property, below the site of the old Camp Cady (on the north bank of the Mojave River, roughly 12 miles (19 km) northeast of Newberry Springs, California). The road is resumed at an access point from the north in Manix Wash. Under optimal conditions, its full length of 133 miles (214 km) from Beale's Crossing to Manix Wash can be travelled in 2 to 3 days. In early 1858 the Mohave Trail became the Mojave Road, a wagon road connected to the newly pioneered Beale's Wagon Road across northern New Mexico Territory from Fort Defiance to Beale's Crossing on the Colorado River where it linked up with the Mojave Road. Wagon trains of settlers coming west on the Santa Fe Trail soon followed Beale's Wagon Road and the Mojave Road into Southern California. Beale's road was shorter than the route via the more southern Southern Emigrant Trail and it was cooler in summer, snow-free in winter, had better forage, and was better watered. Soon hostilities began between the Mohave's and the settlers, triggering the Mohave War.

From the time of the Mohave War the Mohave Road came under the purview of the U.S. government. Army posts were established at Fort Mojave, at Beale's Crossing in 1859, and, after the Bitter Spring Expedition at Camp Cady, 10.9 miles (17.5 km) east of Fork of the Road at its junction with the Mormon Road, in 1860. Smaller outposts were established later in the 1860s east of Camp Cady along the trail and regular patrols instituted. The army protected the settlers and travelers from the attacks of the resident Paiute, Mojave, and Chemehuevi Native Americans until 1871. This also opened the way for large mining development in the Mojave Desert region of San Bernardino County and agricultural development in the Victor Valley area.

In 1826, American trapper Jedediah Smith used the Mojave Road to come to California. In doing so became the first non-Indian to come to California's Pacific Ocean by land from mid-America. Smith and his party of 15 other men left the Bear River on August 7, 1826, and after retrieving the cache he had left earlier headed south through present-day Utah and Nevada to the Colorado River, finding increasingly harsh conditions and difficult travel. Finding shelter in a friendly Mojave village near present-day Needles, California, the men and horses recuperated and Smith hired two runaways from the Spanish missions in California to guide them west. After leaving the river and heading into the Mojave Desert, the guides led them through the desert via the Mohave Trail that would become the western portion of the Old Spanish Trail. Upon reaching the San Bernardino Valley of California, Smith and Abraham LaPlant (who spoke some Spanish) borrowed horses from a rancher and rode to the San Gabriel Mission on November 27, 1826, to present themselves to its director, Father José Bernardo Sánchez, who received them warmly. (Note: Harrison Rogers remembered Sánchez fondly in his journal.)

Camp Cady (1860–1861, 1866–1871) was a U.S. Army Camp, on the Mojave River, located about 20 miles east of modern-day Barstow, California in San Bernardino County, at an elevation of 1690 feet. Camp Cady was named after Major Albemarle Cady, 6th Infantry Regiment, who was a friend of Carleton and commander at Fort Yuma in 1860. Camp Cady is on the Mojave Road. Camp Cady is California Historical Landmark 963-1 designated on March 19, 1985.

- To note this Historic road, the State of California placed a Historic Marker at the end of the road, at Drum Barracks. The marker is at 1053 Cary Street, Wilmington, California, this is at the corner of Cary Ave and Opp street. The Drum Barracks parking lot entrance is at 1052 N. Banning Boulevard, Wilmington, California.

== California Historical Landmark Marker ==
California Historical Landmark Marker NO. 963 near the Drum Barracks site reads:

- NO. 963 THE MOJAVE ROAD – Long ago, Mohave Indians used a network of pathways to cross the Mojave Desert. In 1826, American trapper Jedediah Smith used their paths and became the first non-Indian to reach the California coast overland from mid-America. The paths were worked into a military wagon road in 1859. This "Mojave Road" remained a major link between Los Angeles and points east until a railway crossed the desert in 1885.

California Historical Landmark Marker for Camp Cady #963-1 at the Camp Cady Mojave Desert site reads:

- NO. 963-1 Camp Cady was located on the Mojave Road which connected Los Angeles to Albuquerque. Non-Indian travel on this and the nearby Salt Lake Road was beset by Paiutes, Mohaves, and Chemehuevis defending their homeland. To protect both roads, Camp Cady was established by U.S. Dragoons in 1860. The main building was a stout mud redoubt. Improved camp structures were built 1/2 mile west in 1868. After peace was achieved, the military withdrew in 1871. This protection provided by Camp Cady enabled travelers, merchandise, and mail using both roads to boost California's economy and growth.

== See also ==
- California Historical Landmarks in Los Angeles County
- List of California Ranchos
- Ranchos of Los Angeles County, California
