= Mojave Forks Dam =

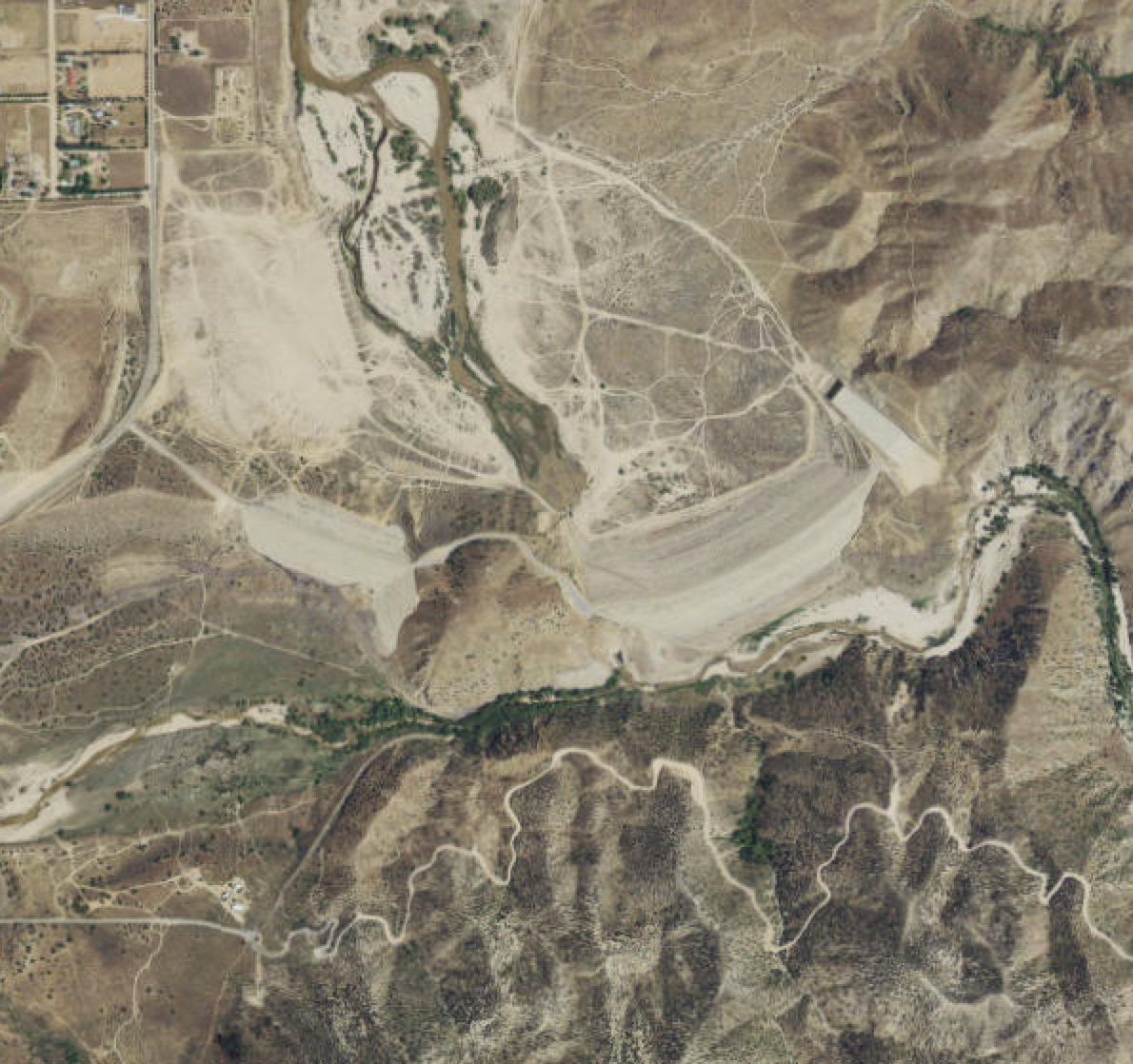
- Satellite view, showing the main dam and spillway to the right, and auxiliary dam to the left. The Mojave River flows north (up) downstream of the dam.

- Location within California
- Country: United States
- Location: Hesperia, California
- Coordinates: 34°20′36″N 117°14′03″W
- Purpose: Flood control
- Construction began: 1967; 59 years ago
- Opening date: 1974; 52 years ago
- Owners: U.S. Army Corps of Engineers, Los Angeles District

Dam and spillways
- Type of dam: Rolled earthfill embankment
- Impounds: Mojave River
- Height: 193 ft (59 m)
- Length: 2,223 ft (678 m)

Reservoir
- Creates: Mojave River Forks Reservoir
- Total capacity: 179,400 acre⋅ft (221,300,000 m^{3})
- Catchment area: 215 mi^{2} (560 km^{2})

The Mojave Forks Dam, most often known as the Mojave River Dam, is an earth-fill dry dam across the Mojave River in San Bernardino County, California in the United States. Completed in 1974 by the U.S. Army Corps of Engineers (USACE), the dam is located at the confluence of the West Fork Mojave River and Deep Creek, and can store approximately 179,400 acre⋅ft (221,300,000 m^{3}) of water.

== History ==
The Mojave River forks were first identified as a potential dam site in 1875, and flooding in the 1930s confirmed the need for a flood control facility along the Mojave River. However, it would be 30 more years before the state endorsed such a project. The West Fork Flood Control and Reservoir Project were authorized in 1960, and the USACE created a final design by 1966. Construction began in June 1967, and the embankment was topped out in May 1971. The project was formally completed and operational by 1974.

Federal engineers found in 2019 that the dam falls short of national safety standards and could erode and collapse in an extreme flood.

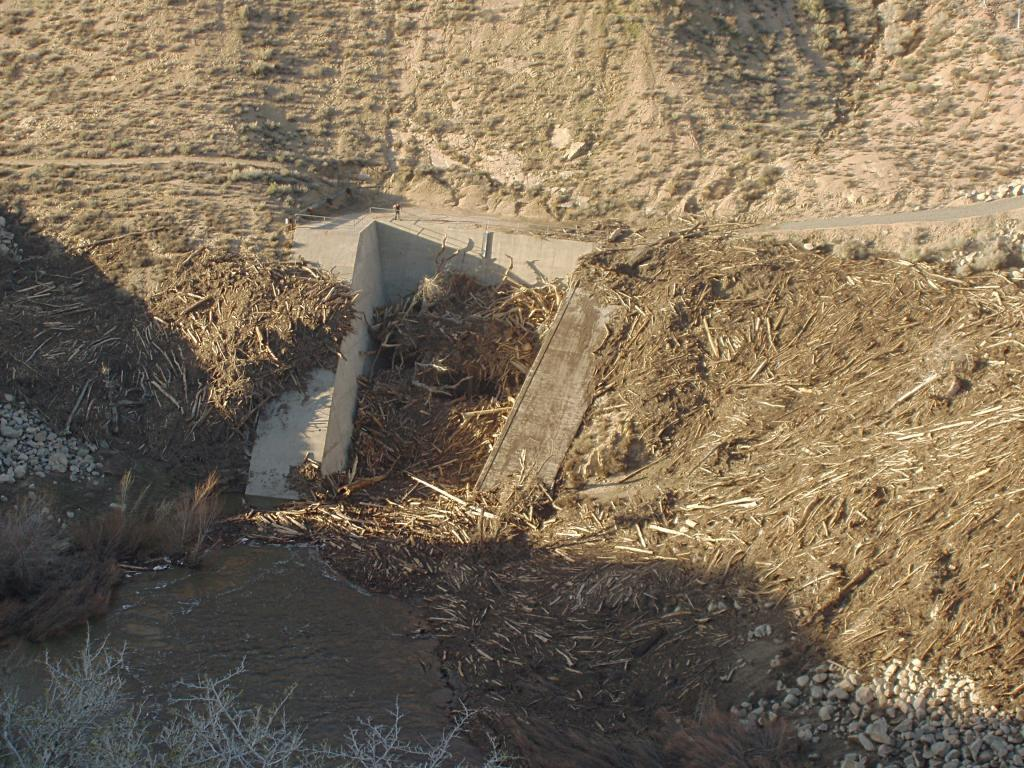
Mojave River dam outlet (upstream view)

== Dimensions and location ==
The dam is 200 feet (61 m) high from the foundations, 193 feet (59 m) high above the riverbed, and 2,223 feet (678 m) long. The main embankment, a rolled earthfill design, contains 5,310,000 cubic yards (4,060,000 m^{3}) of material. A smaller auxiliary dam is located directly to the west of the main dam, while the concrete spillway is on the east side of the dam.

The reservoir controls runoff from a rugged drainage basin of 215 square miles (560 km^{2}) on the north slope of the San Bernardino Mountains. Although the entire Mojave River basin covers 4,700 square miles (12,000 km^{2}), the comparatively small area behind the dam contributes the vast majority of the water in the river, the remaining 95 percent of the watershed being desert. The towns of Victorville, Hesperia, Apple Valley and others in the Victor Valley region along the Mojave River, as well as towns further downstream such as Barstow, are the primary beneficiaries of the project.

== Operations ==
Because the dam serves strictly for flood control, the reservoir is usually low or non-existent; however, it can fill quickly following heavy winter storms. Flood waters are released as quickly as possible without exceeding the capacity of downstream levees. Unlike most dams, the Mojave Dam outlet has no gates, meaning that the outflow is directly dependent on the water level behind the dam. All river flows below 7,300 cubic feet per second (210 m^{3}/s) pass unimpeded through the dam's outlets. The dam is designed to contain a design flood of 94,000 cubic feet per second (2,700 m^{3}/s), to a maximum outflow of 23,500 cubic feet per second (670 m^{3}/s). The reservoir is generally drained within 2–3 days of a flooding event.

Because the dam reduces the sharp peaks of flash floods in the Mojave River channel, it also provides incidental groundwater recharge benefits in the Victor Valley area.

== Recreation ==
Although there is no permanent pool at Mojave Forks, the dam and the surrounding area are part of Mojave River Forks Regional Park, which provides camping and hiking facilities. The Pacific Crest Trail also runs parallel the eastern end of the dam as it travels between the valleys of Deep Creek and the West Fork Mojave River.

== See also ==
- Cedar Springs Dam/Silverwood Lake
- Los Angeles Flood of 1938
- Mojave Narrows Park
