= Indian Hill =

Indian Hill may refer to:

- Indian Hill Cemetery, a cemetery in Middletown, Connecticut
- Indian Hill station, a commuter railroad station in Winnetka, Illinois
- Indian Hill (Minnesota), a peak in the Leaf Mountains of west-central Minnesota
- Indian Hill (New York), an historic site and park in Onondaga County, New York
- Indian Hill, Ohio, a suburb of Cincinnati, Ohio
- Indian Hill, Amador County, California, a place in California
- Indian Hill, Imperial County, California, a place in California
- Indian Hill in Claremont, California, also known as Torojoatngna
- Indian Hill (Lanfair Buttes), southernmost of the Lanfair Buttes, in San Bernardino County, California.
- Indian Hill (arts center), a now-defunct summer art and music camp in western Massachusetts.
- Indian Hill, a mountain in Judith Basin County, Montana
- Indian Hill, a mountain in Lake County, Montana
- Indian Hill, a mountain in McCone County, Montana

== See also ==
- Indian Hills (disambiguation)
- Indian Hill-North Village
- Tumulus, or Indian mound
