= Summit Valley (San Bernardino County, California) =

Valley along SR 138 east of Cajon Pass

Summit Valley is a valley along SR 138 in the San Bernardino Mountains, east of Cajon Pass within San Bernardino County, California.

Its mouth lies at an elevation of 3,048 feet (929 meters) west of the source of the Mojave River, at the confluence of the West Fork Mojave River and Deep Creek. The West Fork Mohave River descends from Silverwood Lake reservoir through the eastern part of Summit Valley to the confluence. The western half of Summit Valley narrows into what is called Horsethief Canyon, that reaches to the head of Summit Valley at 34°19′34″N 117°25′39″W, just east of the summit of Cajon Pass.
