= Fork of the Road =

Locale in San Bernardino County, California

Coordinates: 34°54′05″N 116°45′35″W

Fork of the Road was the locale along the Mojave River where the junction of the Mojave Trail / Mojave Road and the Old Spanish Trail / Mormon Road was located in San Bernardino County, California. The location of Fork of the Road was on the north side of the Mojave River, 18.75 miles southwest of Bitter Spring, about 14.5 miles east of Grapevine, and 10.9 miles west of Camp Cady. The location was an oasis where the Mojave River came to the surface. There travelers could get water, camp, rest and graze their animals before or after crossing the desert.

== Alcorn Ranch ==
By the fall of 1864, a man named Alcorn, from Kentucky and his wife from South Carolina, had started a ranch at Fork of the Road. From November 13, 1864, following an Indian attack on settlers along the Mojave River the Alcorn Ranch was the gathering place for defense of the settler families along the river between Point of Rocks and Camp Cady. Mrs. Jane Rousseau who traveled with her husband, a doctor, in a wagon train from Salt Lake City to Southern California in late 1864, wrote that Alcorn had supplied them with feed for their horses when they had run out of it at Bitter Spring. They stopped at the Alcorn Ranch and her husband treated "a young man about to die, a son of Mr. Allcorn....", before moving on up the Mojave River.
