= Marl Spring =

Coordinates: 35°10′09″N 115°38′56″W

Marl Spring is a spring in San Bernardino County, California. It lies an elevation of 3,901 miles / 1,189 meters on the northeastern part of the Marl Mountains.

== History ==
Marl Spring was a natural spring located along the trade route of the Mohave called the Mohave Trail and the later Mexican trade route called the Old Spanish Trail between New Mexico and Alta California. Marl Springs was located 70 miles west of Fort Mohave on the American wagon road, the Mojave Road, made in 1858 during the Mohave War. Marl Springs was a vital watering hole on the Mojave Road. The next water was 30 miles west at Soda Springs, and 18 miles east at Government Holes. A U.S. Army Camp, Camp Marl Springs was first established in 1867 as an outpost of Camp Cady to defend the springs from Indian raids on the spring and the road. It remained in use until 1868.
