= Sawpit Canyon =

Valley in California, United States

Sawpit Canyon is a steep valley or canyon in the San Bernardino Mountains of San Bernardino County, California. Its mouth is at an elevation of 3,386 feet (1,032 meters). Its source is located at 34°14′43″N 117°20′56″W and lies at an elevation of 5,100 feet, just east of Monument Peak. Its creek was a tributary of the West Fork Mojave River, its original mouth now under Silverwood Lake.

== History ==
Sawpit Canyon was part of the route of the Mohave Trail, taken by the Native American traders from the Colorado River and beyond in the southwest to the Pacific Ocean. In 1776, Father Francisco Garcés became the first known explorer to travel on this route and leave a written record of his experiences. Jedediah Smith, in 1826, was the first known Anglo-American to use the Mohave Trail.
