= Indian Well (Lanfair Buttes) =

Coordinates: 35°08′43″N 115°09′32″W

Indian Well is a locale, an old well, at the foot of the southwestern slope of the Lanfair Buttes, northwest of the summit of Indian Hill. It is located a little over a mile north of the Mojave Road in the Mojave Desert in San Bernardino County, California. Native American Petroglyphs are found nearby Indian Well, on the western slope of the Buttes. The Indian Well petroglyphs indicate it was a Native American water source and camping site in previous centuries. Indian Well was also located along the route of the Mohave Trail.
