= Fort Atkinson =

Fort Atkinson is the name of several locations in the United States:

- Fort Atkinson, Iowa, a town named after General Atkinson
- Fort Atkinson State Preserve, 1840s U.S. Army post in Fort Atkinson, Iowa
- Fort Atkinson (Kansas), an 1850s U.S. Army post
- Fort Atkinson (Nebraska), 1820s U.S. Army post
- Fort Atkinson, Wisconsin, a city
- Fort Koshkonong, a Black Hawk War fort in Wisconsin sometimes called Fort Atkinson
