= Eagle Mountain =

Eagle Mountain or Eagle Mountains may refer to:

== Summits ==
Canada

- Eagle Mountain, British Columbia near Coquitlam
- Eagle Mountain (Alberta) in Banff Park

Republic of Ireland

- Mount Eagle (Ireland), a 516 m peak in County Kerry, Ireland.

United Kingdom

- Eagle Mountain, Down, a 638 m peak in the Mourne Mountains, County Down, Northern Ireland

United States

- Eagle Mountain, summit in Polk County, Arkansas
- Eagle Mountain (Lanfair Buttes), San Bernardino County, California
- Eagle Mountain (Minnesota)
- Eagle Mountain (Ulster County, New York)
- Eagle Mountains, a mountain range in California, USA

== Communities in the United States ==
- Eagle Mountain, California, a modern-day ghost town and birthplace of the Kaiser Permanente health maintenance organization
- Eagle Mountain, Texas, a census-designated place
- Eagle Mountain, Utah

== Other ==
- Eagle Mountain Lake, a lake in the United States
  - Eagle Mountain-Saginaw Independent School District, near the lake
- Eagle Mountain Railroad, a former private railroad in California, USA
- Eagle Mountain (horse), an international champion racehorse
