= Summit Valley =

Summit Valley may refer to:

- Summit Valley (Los Angeles County, California), a valley south of Woodland Hills
- Summit Valley (San Bernardino County, California), a valley along SR 138 east of Cajon Pass
- A former name for Soda Springs, Nevada County, California
