= Albemarle Cady =

United States Army officer 1807-1888

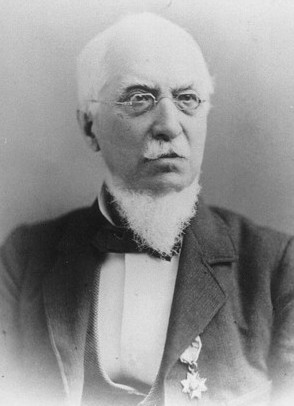
- Albemarle Cady with the medal of the Aztec Club
- Born: February 15, 1807; Keene, New Hampshire
- Died: March 14, 1888 (aged 81) New Haven, Connecticut
- Buried: Concord, New Hampshire
- Allegiance: United States of America
- Branch: United States Army
- Service years: 1829–1864
- Rank: Colonel; Brevet Brigadier general, U.S. Army
- Commands: District of Oregon (military); Camp for Draftees – New Haven, Connecticut
- Conflicts: Second Seminole War; Mexican–American War; Siege of Veracruz; Battle of Cerro Gordo; Battle of Contreras; Battle of Churubusco; Battle of Molino del Rey; First Sioux War; Battle of Ash Hollow; American Civil War

Albemarle Cady (February 15, 1807 – March 14, 1888) was a career United States Army officer who served in the Second Seminole War, Mexican–American War, First Sioux War and the American Civil War. During the Civil War, he was briefly lieutenant colonel of the 7th Infantry Regiment (United States). He then served in administrative positions in the Department of the Pacific, including the District of Oregon. He received brevet appointments for his service in the Mexican–American War and the Civil War. He retired from the Regular Army as a colonel on May 18, 1864. On July 17, 1866, President Andrew Johnson nominated and on July 26, 1866, the United States Senate confirmed the appointment of Cady as a brevet brigadier general in the Regular Army, to rank from March 13, 1865.

== Early life ==
Albemarle Cady was born in Keene, New Hampshire, on February 15, 1807. He graduated from Norwich Military Academy in 1825. He was appointed as a cadet at the United States Military Academy at West Point, New York, on July 1, 1825. Upon graduation from the US Military Academy on July 1, 1829, he was appointed brevet second lieutenant in the 6th United States Infantry Regiment and second lieutenant on the same day.

Cady was stationed at Fort Leavenworth, Kansas, on frontier duty until 1833 and then at Jefferson Barracks Military Post on the same duty during 1833–1834. He was on engineer duty during 1834–1837.

Cady was promoted to first lieutenant, 6th United States Infantry Regiment, on December 31, 1836. In 1837–1838, Cady was again on frontier duty at Camp Sabine, Louisiana. He was promoted to captain on July 7, 1838.

Cady served in the Second Seminole War from 1838 to 1842. He returned to frontier duty at Fort Towson in the Indian Territory in 1842 and at Fort Gibson, also in the Indian Territory, from 1843 to 1846.

== Mexican–American War ==
Cady fought in the Mexican–American War from 1846 to 1848. He participated in the Siege of Veracruz, March 9–29, 1847; the Battle of Cerro Gordo, April 17–18, 1847; Skirmish of Amazoque, May 14, 1847; Capture of San Antonio, August 20, 1847; the Battle of Churubusco, August 20, 1847; and the Battle of Molino del Rey, September 8, 1847, where he was wounded. Captain Cady commanded one of the five parties of one hundred U.S. soldiers each who stormed the flour mill at the Battle of Molino del Rey but who were repulsed with numerous casualties.

Cady was appointed brevet major, September 8, 1847, for gallant and meritorious conduct in the Battle of Molino del Rey. Cady was a member of the Aztec Club of 1847, which was founded as a military society of officers who served with the United States Army in the Mexican–American War.

== Assignments: 1848–1861 ==
After the Mexican–American War, Cady was assigned to garrison duty at Jefferson Barracks Military Post, Missouri, in 1848 and Fort Scott, Kansas, also in 1848. After duty on recruiting service, during 1849–1850, he returned to frontier duty at Fort Scott, Kansas, in 1850–1852; then Fort Riley, Kansas, 1853–1854; and on the Santa Fe Route, near Fort Atkinson (Kansas), 1854. Cady was promoted to major, 6th U.S. Infantry Regiment, January 27, 1853.

Following garrison duty at Jefferson Barracks, 1854–1855, Cady returned to frontier duty. He participated in the Sioux Expedition of 1855. He commanded five companies of the Sixth U.S. Infantry Regiment at the Battle of Ash Hollow, also called the Battle of Blue Water, Dakota Territory, September 3, 1855. The U.S. force, under the overall command of Brigadier General William S. Harney, killed 86 Sioux, including women and children, and took 70 prisoners, mostly women and children, while losing 27 men killed. The attack on the Sioux was a "punitive expedition" in retaliation for the Grattan massacre. Cady continued in command near Fort Pierre, Dakota Territory, in 1855 and 1856. He served as Superintendent of the General Recruiting Service, July 1, 1857, to June 30, 1859. Then, he again served on frontier duty at Fort Yuma, California, 1860–1861.

Camp Cady (1860–1861, 1866–1871) was a United States Army camp, on the Mojave Road near the Mojave River in the Mojave Desert, located about 20 miles (32 km) east of modern-day Barstow in San Bernardino County, California. Camp Cady was named for Major Albemarle Cady by his friend Major James H. Carleton, commander at Fort Yuma, California, in 1860.

== American Civil War ==
Cady was promoted to lieutenant colonel, 7th Infantry Regiment (United States), June 6, 1861. During the Civil War, Cady served in command of the District of Oregon from October 23, 1861, to April 7, 1862. He was on sick leave and awaiting orders, April–November, 1862. Then he was on duty at San Francisco, California, from November, 1862 to January 29, 1863. From January 29, 1863, to July 31, 1863, Cady served as Acting Inspector-General of the Department of the Pacific. Then he was awaiting orders and was before the Retiring Board at Wilmington, Delaware, from July 31, 1863, to February 6, 1864. Meanwhile, Cady was promoted to colonel, 8th Infantry Regiment (United States) on October 20, 1863.

Cady was retired from active service in the U.S. Army on May 18, 1864, due to disability, which resulted from long and faithful service and exposure to disease in the line of duty. Nonetheless, Cady commanded the Draft Rendezvous at New Haven, Connecticut, from March 4, 1864, to October 25, 1865.

== Later life ==
Cady was unemployed from October 25, 1865, to December 18, 1866.

On July 17, 1866, President Andrew Johnson nominated Cady for appointment as a brevet brigadier general in the Regular Army, to rank from March 13, 1865, for long and faithful service to the Army. The United States Senate confirmed the appointment on July 26, 1866.

From December 1866 to March 31, 1867, Cady served on a Court of Inquiry at New York City.

== Death ==
Albemarle Cady died at New Haven, Connecticut on March 14, 1888, at aged 81. He is buried at the Old North Cemetery (Concord, New Hampshire).

== See also ==
- List of American Civil War brevet generals (Union)
