= Point of Rocks (San Bernardino County, California) =

Coordinates: 34°45′29″N 117°18′48″W

Point of Rocks is a point of mountain range, as yet unnamed, that projects into the bed of the Mojave River in San Bernardino County, California. This range of mountains runs south to north along the east side of the Mojave River between Oro Grande and the mountain that Point of Rocks is a part, a mile northeast of Helendale.

== History ==
Point of Rocks was a landmark along the Mojave Trail, and its successors, the Old Spanish Trail and the Mormon Road that followed the riverbed. It marked a point where the Mojave River would appear above ground to run on the surface surrounded by grassland, marshes and groves of cottonwood and willow. This made it a camping spot along the old trails and roads that followed the river. In 1863, the area of Point of Rocks was first settled by the Nicholson family.

The later railroad built along the river there was built through a cut through the Point above the river, and the later automobile roads avoided it passing to the east of the mountain at Helendale.
