= Indian Hills =

Indian Hills may refer to:

== Places in the United States ==
- Indian Hills, Colorado
- Indian Hills, Wichita, Kansas
- Indian Hills, Kentucky
- Indian Hills, Nevada
- Indian Hills, New Mexico
- Indian Hills, Texas
- Indian Hills, Wisconsin

== Other uses ==
- Indian Hills Community College, Ottumwa and Centerville, Iowa
- Indian Hills Theater, Omaha, Nebraska

== See also ==
- Indian Hills High School (disambiguation)
- Indian Hill (disambiguation)
