= East Fork of West Fork Mojave River =

Tributary stream of the West Fork Mojave River

East Fork of West Fork Mojave River is a tributary stream of the West Fork Mojave River, itself a tributary of the Mojave River, in the San Bernardino Mountains of San Bernardino County, California. Its mouth originally was at its confluence with the West Fork Mojave River which is now submerged under Lake Silverwood. It now lies at an elevation of 3,376 feet/1,029 meters at its confluence with that lake. The source of the East Fork is at 34°15′11″N 117°14′24″W at an elevation of 5,500 feet in Twin Peaks, California.
