= Little Green Valley (California) =

Little Green Valley is a valley in the San Bernardino Mountains, of San Bernardino County, California. Its mouth lies southwest of Crafts Peak at an elevation of 6,972 feet / 2,125 meters. Its head is at 34°14′19″N 117°02′52″W at an elevation of 7500 feet. Deep Creek has its source at the head of this valley.
