= Horsethief Canyon =

Upper part of Summit Valley in San Bernardino County, California

Horsethief Canyon, is a canyon comprising the upper part of the Summit Valley in San Bernardino County, California. Its head lies at 34°19′33″N 117°25′38″W at an elevation of 3,800 feet just east of the summit of Cajon Pass, and its mouth at an elevation of 3,123 feet / 952 meters. California State Routes 138 and 173 pass through it.

There is also a separate Horsethief Canyon in San Diego County, California, near Pine Valley, California and the Mexico–United States border. It is located in the Cleveland National Forest, in the Pine Creek Wilderness.
