= Pilot Fire =

2016 wildfire in Southern California

- Part of the 2016 California wildfires
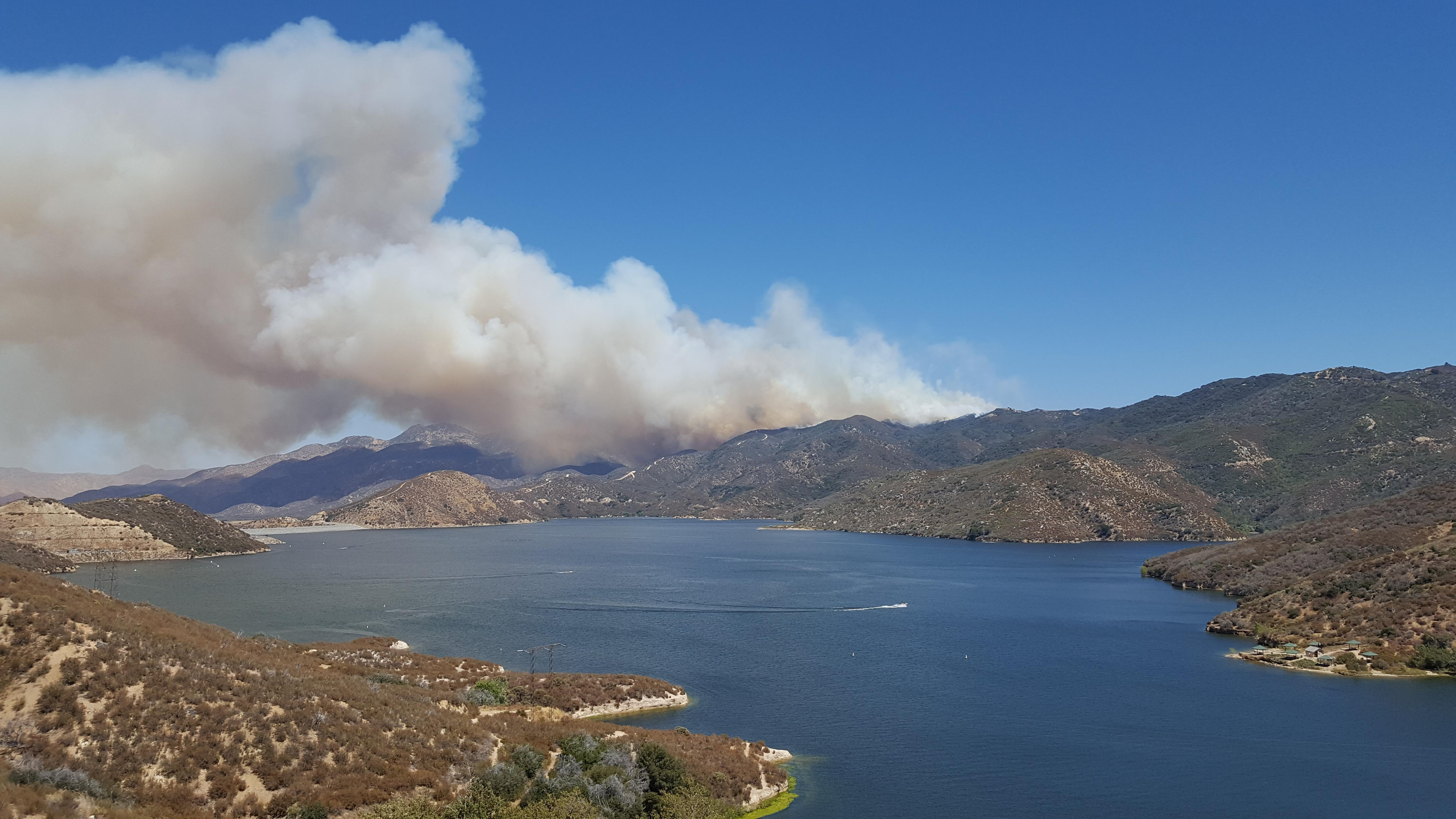
- View of the smoke plume of the Pilot Fire, with Silverwood Lake in foreground, August 07.
- Date: August 7, 2016 –; August 16, 2016
- Location: Silverwood Lake, San Bernardino County, California
- Coordinates: 34.288°N 117.251°W

Statistics
- Burned area: 8,110 acres (33 km^{2})

Impacts
- Structures lost: 0

Ignition
- Cause: Vehicle Fire

Map
- Location in Southern California

The Pilot Fire was a wildfire that burned near Silverwood Lake in San Bernardino County, California. The fire started at about 12:10 pm on Sunday, August 7, 2016, near the Miller Canyon OHV area off California State Route 138.

The name "Pilot" refers to where the fire was first reported: the Pilot Rock Conservation Camp, a minimum-security prison camp/fire camp consisting of inmates trained for firefighting.

The fire was under the management of the United States Forest Service in Unified Command with the California Department of Forestry and Fire Protection (CAL FIRE), the San Bernardino County Fire Department, and the San Bernardino County Sheriff's Department. The estimated full containment date was by 6:00 AM (PST) on August 16, 2016 and burned a total of 8,110 acres.

On March 1, 2017, six months after the fire, fire investigators with the San Bernardino National Forest determined the cause was by a vehicle on fire.
