= Pinto Mountain =

Mountain in California, United States

Coordinates: 35°10′48″N 115°22′23″W

Pinto Mountain is a summit, north of Round Valley, within the Mojave National Preserve, in San Bernardino County, California. Its summit rises to an elevation of 5,948 feet (1,813 m).
