= List of members of the Aztec Club of 1847 =

This is a list of members of the Aztec Club of 1847. The Aztec Club of 1847 was founded as a military society of officers who served with the United States Army in the Mexican–American War.

The first rank indicated is the rank held at the forming of the club during the Mexican War; the later rank is the highest full rank the officer held in Regular, Volunteer or Confederate service.

== Original members ==
There were a total of 160 original members of the Aztec Club, all of whom were serving in the occupation of Mexico City at the time of the Club's founding in 1847. Over time, the club's membership requirements were changed to extend membership to male descendants of officers who served in the Mexican War. Of the 160 original members, 72 became generals in either the United States Army or the Confederate States Army and a majority served in either the Union or Confederate armies during the American Civil War.

Among the Aztec Club's original members were future presidents Franklin Pierce and Ulysses S. Grant as well as Robert E. Lee.

Note - The rank before the member's name is the rank held at the time of their admission to the Aztec Club. The rank after the name is this highest obtained in either the Union or Confederate army.

- Maj. John J. Abercrombie – Brigadier General
- Cpt. Thomas L. Alexander – Lt. Colonel
- Cpt. Robert Allen – Brigadier General
- 1st Lt. Samuel S. Anderson – Colonel, CSA
- 1st Lt. Benjamin H. Arthur – Captain
- Cpt. Electus Backus – Colonel
- Maj. Henry Bainbridge – Lt. Colonel
- Cpt. John G. Barnard – Brigadier General
- Cpt. Moses J. Barnard – Major
- 1st Lt. Jenks Beaman
- 1st Lt. P.G.T. Beauregard – General, CSA
- 2nd Lt. Barnard E. Bee – Brigadier General, CSA
- Lt. Col. Francis S. Belton – Colonel
- Cpt. Charles John Biddle – Colonel
- 1st Lt. William B. Blair – Major, CSA
- Cpt. George A.H. Blake – Brevet Major General
- Cpt. James D. Blanding – Colonel, CSA
- Cpt. William Blanding
- Col. Milledge L. Bonham – Brigadier General, CSA
- 1st Lt. Andrew W. Bowman – Lt. Colonel
- 1st Lt. John M. Brannan – Brigadier General
- Cpt. Horace Brooks – Brigadier General
- 1st Lt. William T.H. Brooks – Major General
- Cpt. Robert C. Buchanan – Colonel
- Brig. Gen. George Cadwalader – Major General
- Cpt. Albemarle Cady – Colonel
- Maj. George Caldwell - Brevet Lieutenant Colonel
- 1st Lt. Robert C. Caldwell, USMC
- 1st Lt. George W. Carr – Colonel, CSA
- 1st Lt. Daniel T. Chandler – Lt. Colonel, CSA
- Maj. Philip St. George Cooke – Brigadier General
- Lt. Henry Coppee
- Cpt. Lewis S. Craig
- Sur. Presley H. Craig
- Lt. Alexander H. Cross
- Cpt. Joseph Daniels
- Maj. Jeremiah V. Dashiell - Colonel
- Cpt. George Deas
- Asst. Sur. David C. De Leon
- Lt. Frederick J. Denman
- Cpt. James Duncan - Colonel
- 1st Lt. Richard S. Ewell - Lieutenant General, CSA
- Lt. Col. Thomas T. Fauntleroy - Brigadier General, Army of Virginia
- Cpt. Edward H. Fitzgerald - Brevet Major
- 2nd Lt. Robert C. Forsyth - Lieutenant Colonel
- 1st Lt. William H. French – Major General
- 2nd Lt. Daniel M. Frost - Colonel
- Cpt. Richard C. Gatlin – Brigadier General, CSA
- 2nd Lt. Alfred Gibbs – Brevet Major General
- 1st Lt. Ulysses S. Grant – General and President of the United States
- 2nd Lt. Schuyler Hamilton – Brigadier General
- Cpt. William J. Hardee - Lieutenant General, CSA
- Col. William S. Harney – Brevet Major General
- 2nd Lt. John P. Hatch - Brevet Major General
- Cpt. William Hoffman - Brevet Major General
- Cpt. Joseph Hooker – Major General
- Cpt. Benjamin Huger - Major General, CSA
- Cpt. Joseph E. Johnston – General, CSA
- Cpt. Philip Kearny – Major General
- Maj. Edmund Kirby - Brevet Colonel
- Cpt. Robert E. Lee – General, CSA
- Lt. Mansfield Lovell - Major General, CSA
- Cpt. John B. Magruder – Major General, CSA
- 2nd Lt. George B. McClellan – Major General
- Cpt. Samuel McGowan - Brigadier General, CSA
- Cpt. William W. Mackall - Brigadier General, CSA
- Cpt. Justus McKinstry – Brigadier General
- Maj. John Munroe – Brevet Colonel, Governor of New Mexico
- Cpt. Abraham C. Myers - Brigadier General, CSA
- Lt. Anderson D. Nelson
- Lt. Washington I. Newton
- Cpt. William A. Nichols - Brevet Major General
- Cpt. Francis N. Page
- 2nd Lt. Innis N. Palmer - Brevet Major General
- Maj. Gen. Robert Patterson - Major General
- 1st Lt. John C. Pemberton – Lieutenant General, CSA
- Brig. Gen. Franklin Pierce - President of the United States
- Maj. William H. Polk – U.S. Representative and brother of President James K. Polk
- Cpt. Andrew Porter - Brigadier General
- 1st Lt. Fitz John Porter – Major General
- Lt. Col. William Preston - Brigadier General, CSA
- Maj. Gen. John A. Quitman - Governor of Mississippi and U.S. Representative
- Lt. George W. Rains - Colonel, CSA and Brigadier General, Georgia Militia
- 2nd Lt. Jesse L. Reno – Major General
- Lt. Roswell S. Ripley - Brigadier General, CSA
- Lt. Oliver L. Shepherd - Brevet Brigadier General
- Cpt. Henry H. Sibley - Brevet Major General and Governor of Minnesota
- Cpt. Charles F. Smith – Major General
- 2nd Lt. Gustavus W. Smith – Major General, CSA
- 2nd Lt. Martin L. Smith - Major General, CSA
- Col. Persifor F. Smith – Brevet Major General
- Lt. William Steele - Brigadier General, CSA
- Cpt. Edward Steptoe - Lieutenant Colonel
- Maj. Adam D. Steuart - Lieutenant Colonel
- 2nd Lt. Charles Pomeroy Stone – Brigadier General
- 1st Lt. George Sykes – Major General
- 2nd Lt. James Stuart - Brevet Captain
- Lt. George Sykes - Major General
- Lt. Francis J. Thomas
- Cpt. Philip R. Thompson
- Lt. Hermann Thorn
- Lt. James Tilton
- 2nd Lt. Zealous B. Tower – Brigadier General
- Surgeon Charles S. Tripler
- Maj. William Turnbull
- Brig. Gen. David E. Twiggs – Major General, CSA
- Maj. Abraham Van Buren – Brevet Lieutenant Colonel and son of President Martin Van Buren
- Lt. Earl Van Dorn
- Maj. Richard D.A. Wade
- 2nd Lt. John D. Wilkins - Colonel
- Col. John S. Williams - Brigadier General
- Lt. Thomas Williams - Brigadier General
- Col. Jones M. Withers - Major General, CSA
- 2nd Lt. Thomas J. Wood – Major General
- 2nd Lt. Lafayette B. Wood - Captain
- Lt. Francis Woodbridge - Brevet Major
- Cpt. Samuel Woods - Colonel
- Bvt. Brig. Gen. William J. Worth - Brevet Major General

== Veteran members ==
In 1871 Club members agreed to accept other officers who had served in Mexico during the Mexican War as Veteran Members; including officers of the United States Navy. Veteran Members were veterans of the Mexican War but were not among the 160 original members who formed the society in 1847. As of 1895, 127 individuals had been admitted as Veteran Members – 49 of which were generals or admirals in United States or Confederate States service.

- Cpt. Benjamin Alvord - Brigadier General
- 1st Lt. Christopher C. Augur – Major General
- Midn. Oscar C. Badger – Commodore, USN
- 2nd Lt. Simon B. Buckner – Lieutenant General, CSA
- 2nd Lt. John L. Broome – Lt. Colonel, USMC
- 2nd Lt. Henry B. Clitz – Lt. Colonel
- Cpt. Silas Casey – Major General
- 2nd Lt. Darius N. Couch – Major General
- Lt. Col. Thomas L. Crittenden – Major General
- 2nd Lt. Frederick T. Dent – Brigadier General
- 2nd Lt. Gustavus De Russy – Brigadier General
- 2nd Lt. Richard C. Drum – Brigadier General
- 1st Lt. William H. Emory – Major General
- 2nd Lt. William B. Franklin – Major General
- 1st Lt. Samuel G. French – Major General, CSA
- 2nd Lt. James Barnet Fry – Brigadier General
- 2nd Lt. George W. Getty – Brigadier General
- Midn. Bancroft Gherardi – Rear Admiral, USN
- 2nd Lt. Winfield Scott Hancock – Major General
- 2nd Lt. Henry Heth – Major General, CSA
- 1st Lt. Henry J. Hunt – Brigadier General
- 2nd Lt. Rufus Ingalls - Brevet Major General
- Lt. Thornton A. Jenkins – Rear Admiral, USN
- Maj. William W. Loring – Major General, CSA
- 1st Lt. James Longstreet – Lieutenant General, CSA
- Midn. Stephen Luce - Rear Admiral, USN
- 2nd Lt. Charles G. McCawley – Colonel, USMC
- 2nd Lt. Joseph H. Potter – Brigadier General
- Cpt. Henry Prince – Brigadier General
- Midn. Alexander C. Rhind – Rear Admiral, USN
- Cpt. Daniel H. Rucker - Brigadier General
- Cpt. Charles F. Ruff - Brevet Brigadier General
- 2nd Lt. Delos B. Sackett - Brevet Major General
- 1st Lt. William T. Sherman – General
- 2nd Lt. Egbert L. Viele – Brigadier General

== Honorary members ==
Only two individuals were chosen as an honorary members of the Aztec Club.

- Chaplain John D. McCarty
- Maj. Gen. Winfield Scott – Bvt. Lieutenant General

== Hereditary members ==
In 1883 provisions were also made to allow male relatives of officers who had died during the Mexican War, prior to the Club's founding, to become members. In 1887, membership was extended to the eldest son or nearest male relative of original and veteran members as hereditary members in order to keep the club alive after the deaths of the veterans. Later, this rule was extended to include direct and collateral male descendants of eligible officers.

- Rear Adm. Conway Hillyer Arnold
- Brig. Gen. Joshua H. Bates
- Henry L. P. Beckwith
- Maj. Charles J. Biddle
- R. Adm. Norman J. Blackwood
- Justice Milledge Lipscomb Bonham
- Lt. Gen. James Carson Breckinridge (USMC)
- R. Adm. Silas Casey, III
- 2nd Lt. Loyall Farragut - Son of Admiral David Farragut
- Alfred W. Gibbs
- Maj. Gen. Frederick D. Grant - son of General Ulysses S. Grant
- Maj. Gen. Ulysses S. Grant, III - grandson of General Ulysses S. Grant
- Maj. Gen. Guy V. Henry
- Mayor George B. McClellan, Jr. - Son of Major General George B. McClellan
- Maj. Gen. David D. Porter (USMC)
- John Stone Stone
- R. Adm. Montgomery M. Taylor
- R. Adm. Aaron Ward
- Maj. Gen. William W. Wotherspoon

== Trivia ==
As the Mexican War was fought only 14 years prior to the American Civil War, many senior officers in both the Union and Confederate armies had been members of the Aztec Club. Of 287 members who joined the society by 1895, 121 were generals in the Union or Confederate armies.

Two presidents of the United States were members of the Aztec Club – Franklin Pierce and Ulysses S. Grant.

Another president who was a veteran of the Mexican War was President and Major General Zachary Taylor, who, although having served with great distinction during the war and despite some sources to the contrary, was not a member of the Aztec Club. He does not appear on the roll of the 160 original members of the society in The Constitution of the Aztec Club of 1847 and the List of Members, 1893. This is because the Club was formed by officers serving in Mexico City in 1847 and Taylor served in northeastern Mexico. The Aztec Club did not expand its membership beyond the original 160 members until 1871 – 21 years after Taylor's death.

John C. Breckinridge, who was Vice President of the United States from 1857 to 1861 and a candidate for president in 1860, who served with the Army of Occupation of Mexico City as the major of the 3rd Kentucky Infantry, did not join the Aztec Club before his death in 1875. He served as a Major General in the Confederate States Army during the American Civil War.

In 1964, the Tomb of the Unknown Soldier at Arlington National Cemetery was presented an Aztec Club medal. "While the Tomb of the Unknown Soldier was created long after the Mexican War, the presentation of the Aztec Club medal connects the Tomb with this conflict and serves as a reminder that the Tomb honors missing and unidentified service members from all periods of American history."
