= Rasor Off-Highway Vehicle Area =

Rasor Off-Highway Vehicle Area is a remote public use area for the off-highway vehicle user located in the Mojave Desert about 50 miles (80 km) east of Barstow, California, administered by the Bureau of Land Management.

Besides the remote nature of the area, another attraction is the historic 19th century Mojave Road which traverses the riding area into the Mojave National Preserve.

Rasor has rolling hills, open valleys, and sand dunes that invite riders willing to travel through this remote area. Elevations range from near 2,427 feet (740 m) elevation down to around 1,275 feet (389 m) elevation at the Mojave River. Vegetation consists of creosote bush scrub, some annual grasses and wild flowers.

== Location ==
The area is located at 35.108780°N 116.143630°W between Interstate 15 and the Mojave National Preserve, about 25 miles (40 km) southwest of Baker. Access roads are Basin Road and Rasor Road east of the I-15. Both of these roads are graded dirt roads.

== Activities ==
Most visitors ride motorcycles or ATVs, drive sandrails or tour the area in four-wheel drive vehicles. The easily accessed areas off the Rasor Road exit are used extensively for OHV and sand rail staging and play. Due to the remoteness of the area, there have been no requests for competitive event permits, leaving this area exclusively for casual riders.

There are many opportunities for hiking, rock scrambling, rockhounding, and plant, bird and wildlife watching. There are desert tortoise, a state and federally listed threatened species, in the riding area.

There are many deep mine shafts in the riding area. Camping is allowed anywhere within the riding area that does not block travel on a road.

== Afton Canyon Natural Area ==
The Afton Canyon Natural Area, managed by the Bureau of Land Management, is located where the Mojave River surfaces due to bedrock. Afton Canyon is designated as an Area of Critical Environmental Concern to protect plant and wildlife habitat, and to preserve scenic values of the Mojave River's riparian area within the canyon.

The Rasor Off-Highway Vehicle Area establishment and use has begun to reverse the heavy off-road vehicles use and damage that occurred in the riverbed and canyon. Restoration projects are ongoing, and have already brought the river's "proper functioning condition" from a "non-functioning" to a "functioning at risk" status. The objectives of the ambitious restoration project are to control exotic plants, particularly the phreatophyte Saltcedar - Tamarix (primarily Tamarix ramosissima and T. parviflora), and restoring critical desert California native plant community "structural elements" for a functioning flora and fauna habitat.

== See also ==
- Category: Mojave Desert
- Desert Region of California
  - Harvey House Railroad Depot "Casa del Desierto" in Barstow, California
  - Barstow Route 66 "Mother Road" Museum,
  - Western America Railroad Museum
