= Deep Creek Hot Springs =

Natural hot springs in San Bernardino National Forest, California, United States

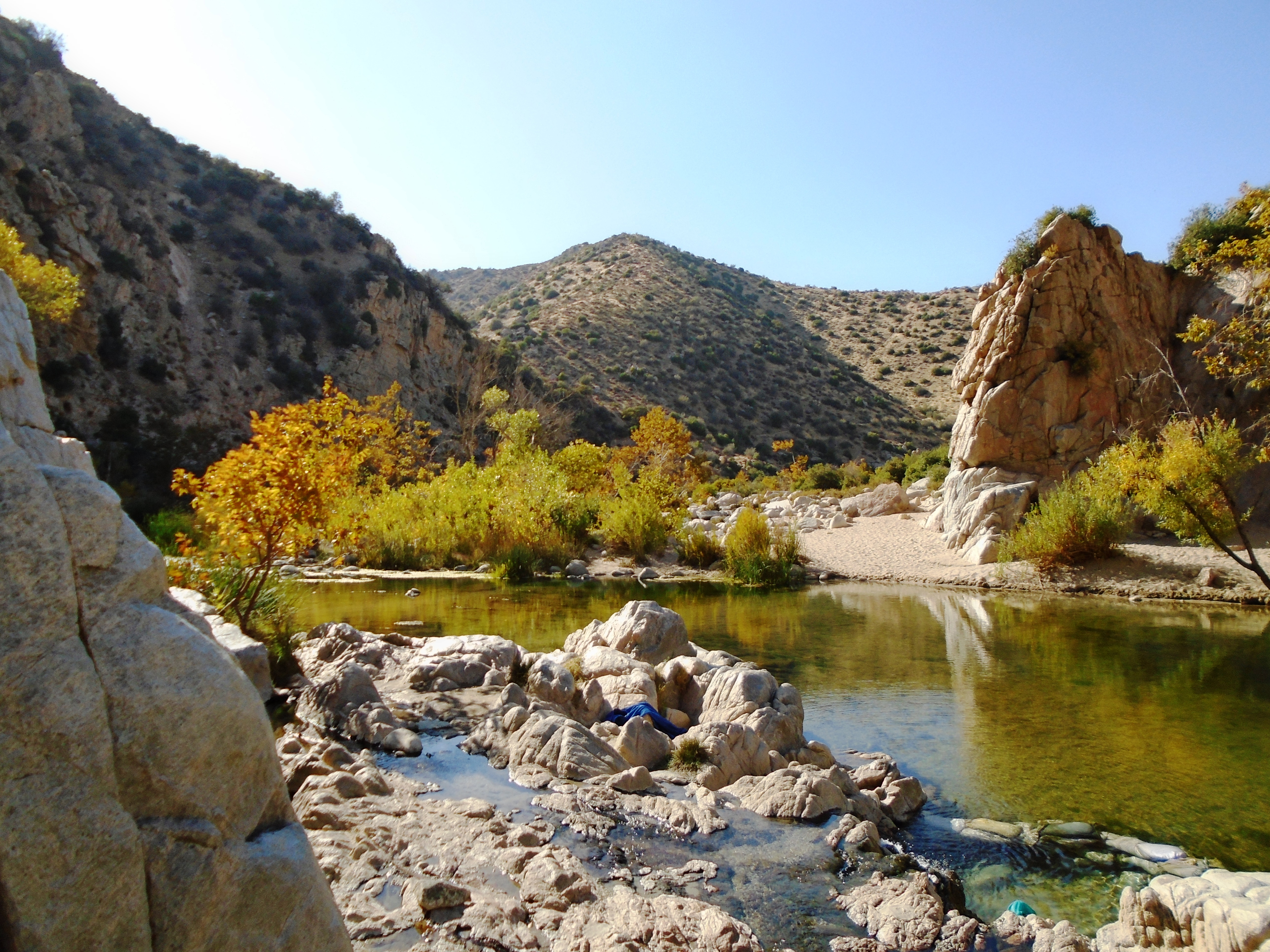
- Deep Creek Hot Springs and Deep Creek, 2019

- Location within California
- Interactive map of Deep Creek Hot Springs
- Location: San Bernardino County, California near the town of Hesperia
- Coordinates: 34°20′22″N 117°10′37″W
- Elevation: 4,500 ft (1,400 m)
- Type: geothermal
- Temperature: 90–108 °F (32–42 °C)

Deep Creek Hot Springs protected area
- Interactive map of Deep Creek Hot Springs protected area
- Governing body: San Bernardino National Forest, United States Forest Service

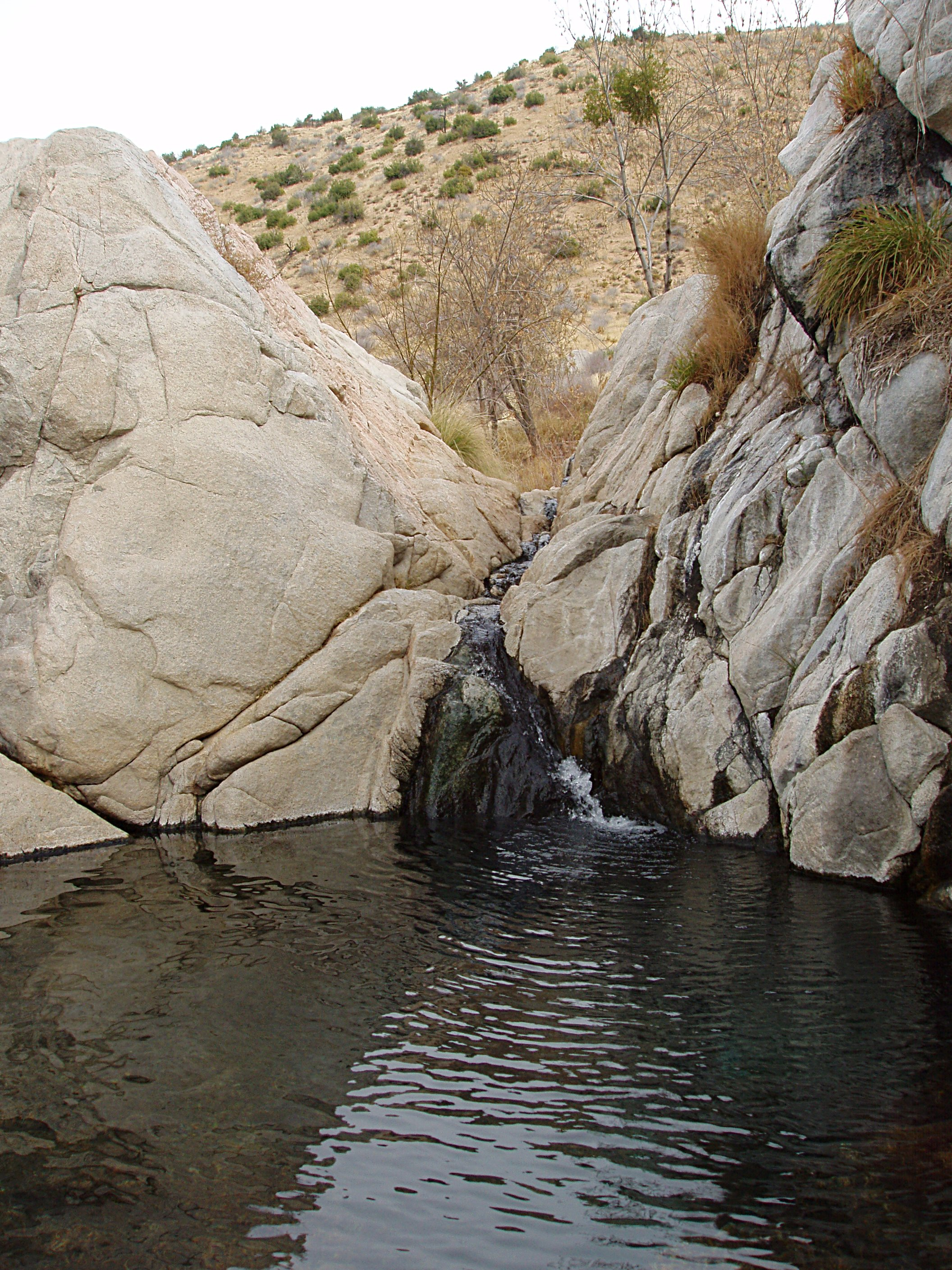
Deep Creek Hot Springs: the Upper Main Pool, fed by hot springs.

Deep Creek Hot Springs, DCHS, are natural hot springs located in the northern Mojave Desert section of the San Bernardino National Forest, near Hesperia in San Bernardino County, Southern California.

== Geography ==
The springs are in the rain shadowed desert foothills of the San Bernardino Mountains on the Deep Creek fork of the Mojave River. They are in a large bouldered riparian zone, surrounded by a rich habitat ecotone of the xeric shrublands—desert chaparral, montane chaparral and piñon-juniper woodlands, and conifer forest plant communities.

The Southwestern Arroyo Toad—Bufo californicus, an endangered species, lives along Deep Creek.

== Recreation ==
Deep Creek Hot Springs, being located next to Deep Creek, provides both hot and cold water locations for clothing optional bathing. The site is managed by the San Bernardino National Forest and is maintained by a volunteer group, the Deep Creek Volunteers.

Water from the creek or pools is not advised for consumption.

The hot pools contain the brain-eating amoeba Naegleria fowleri which can cause the uncommon, but almost invariable fatal, disease primary amoebic meningoencephalitis. Very high fecal coliform counts are found in the hot springs as well.

The hot springs can be reached via three main hiking routes to reach the Hot Springs. The shortest route is the Bowen Ranch / Freedom Trail, at approximately two miles each way. The Bradford Ridge Path is approximately a 2.6 mile one-way hike from the south. The PCT passes through Deep Creek Hot Springs and can be reached from the Lake Arrowhead area, 6 miles each way.

== See also ==
- List of hot springs
- List of hot springs in the United States
- Mojave Narrows Park
