= Eagle Mountain (Lanfair Buttes) =

Summit in Mojave desert, California, USA

Coordinates: 35°09′06″N 115°09′10″W

Eagle Mountain is the tallest and northernmost summit in the Lanfair Buttes is Eagle Mountain in the Mojave National Preserve in the Mojave Desert in San Bernardino County, California. It rises to an elevation of 1338 feet.
