= Mojave Narrows Park =

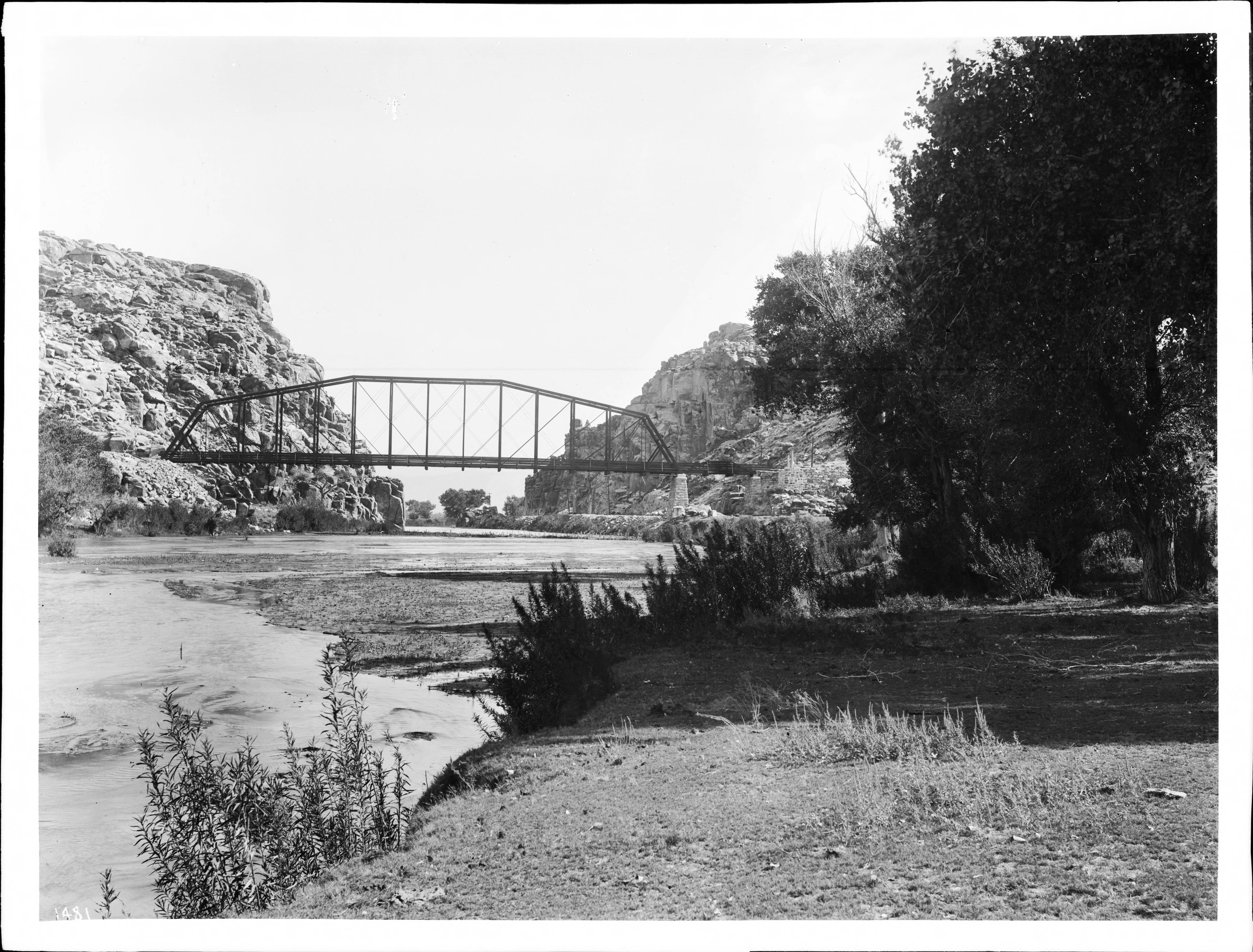
- Mojave River Narrows bridge near Victorville, ca. 1905–1910
- Interactive map of Mojave Narrows Park
- Location: 18000 Yates Rd, Victorville, California
- Coordinates: 34.5219711447832°N 117.27896468992684°W
- Area: 886 acres (359 ha)

Mojave Narrows Park is a regional park in San Bernardino County, California, near Victorville. It features a 50-acre (20 ha) fishing lake and hiking trails.

Once described as "one of Southern California's least-known parks," it is a location where the typically subterranean Mojave River flows above ground. The river rises out of a "long gorge with granite walls" near the park's northern boundary. As described by the Los Angeles Times, "the now-you-see it, now-you-don't Mojave River comes to a rocky gate near Victorville called Mojave Narrows. Here the water comes to the surface in lakes, sloughs and green pastures." The section of the park near the river is "an inviting expanse of green meadows, cottonwoods, willow thickets, and year-round water in river channels, creeks, bogs, ponds, and two small lakes."

Over 250 species of birds have been observed at the park, up from 125 species 50 years ago. Beavers have been periodically sighted in the park since its establishment up to the present day.

The park permits RV camping and tent camping at designated locations.

Los Angeles-bound BNSF Railway freight trains "frequently rumble past," crossing over bridges on the western boundary of the park. The Santa Fe Railroad pioneered a train route named Frost through Mojave Narrows to the west in 1885.

In antiquity, the "oasis" was visited by Native Americans, later by migrant travelers from back east. The land for the park, previously called North Verde Ranch and then Kemper Campbell Ranch, was purchased by San Bernardino County in the late 1960s. A 1973 newspaper "trip of the week" feature described the state of the park at that time: "Ranch guests are housed in adobes that seem to grow out of the hillside. The informal ranch life includes swimming, tennis, bass fishing, hiking and riding on trails…The late afternoon and evening views are gorgeous over the crumpled Narrows rocks, pale desert mountains and snowy San Bernardinos in the distance."

== See also ==
- Mojave National Preserve
- Mojave Trails National Monument
- Joshua Tree National Park
- San Bernardino National Forest
- Deep Creek Hot Springs
