= Deep Creek (Mojave River tributary) =

Deep Creek East Fork Mojave River
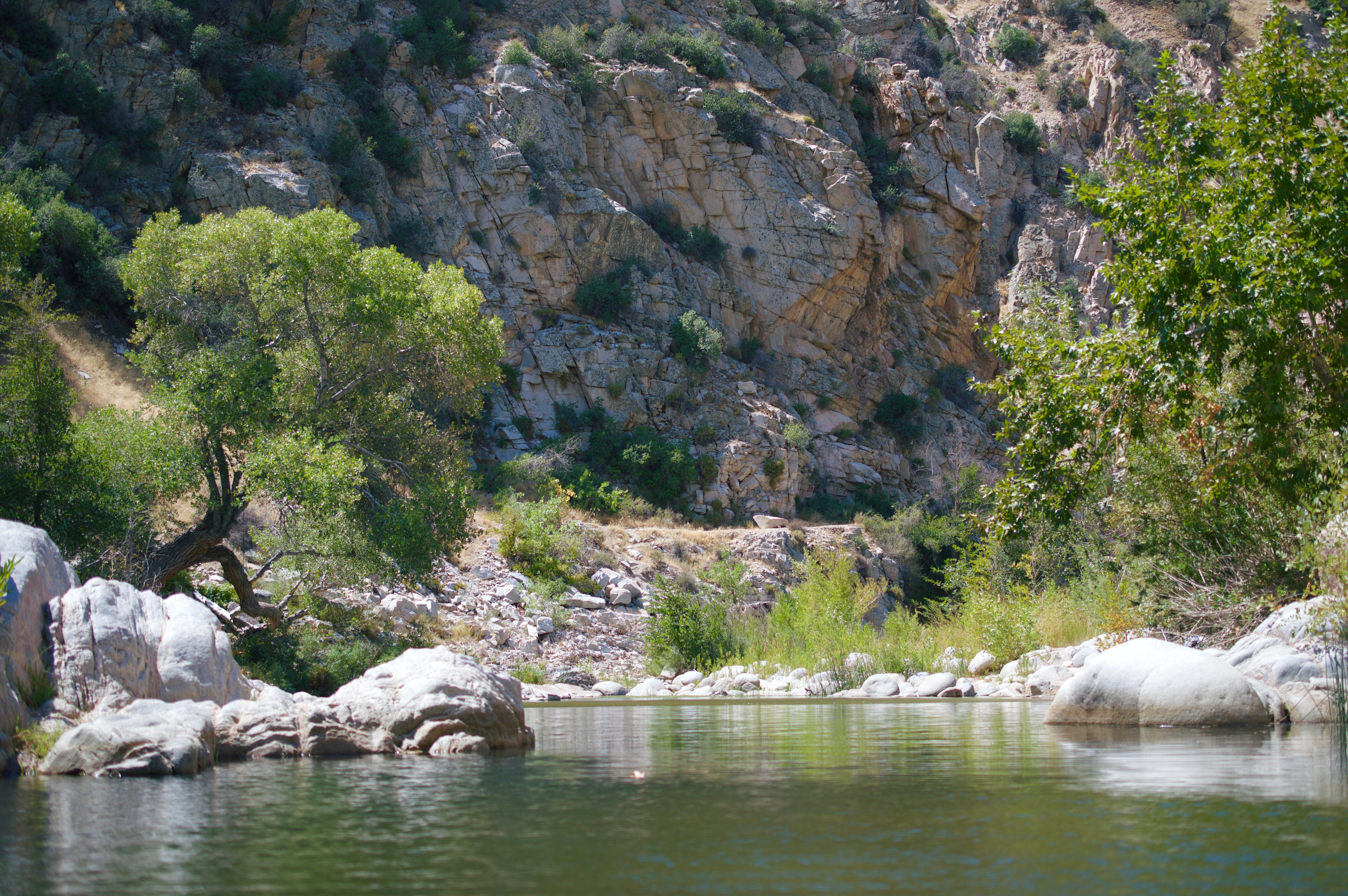
- At Deep Creek Hot Springs

Location
- Country: United States
- State: California
- County: San Bernardino

Physical characteristics
- Source: Little Green Valley
  - location: San Bernardino Mountains
  - coordinates: 34°14′19″N 117°02′55″W
  - elevation: 7,512 ft (2,290 m)
- Mouth: Mojave River
  - location: Mojave Forks Dam
  - coordinates: 34°20′29″N 117°14′15″W
  - elevation: 2,992 ft (912 m)
- Length: 23.4 mi (37.7 km)
- Basin size: 135 mi^{2} (350 km^{2})
- Discharge
  - location: near Hesperia, 0.5 mi (0.80 km) from the mouth
  - average: 72.5 cu ft/s (2.05 m^{3}/s)
  - minimum: 0.07 cu ft/s (0.0020 m^{3}/s)
  - maximum: 46,600 cu ft/s (1,320 m^{3}/s)

Basin features
- Tributaries
  - left: Shake Creek, Sheep Creek, Hooks Creek, Willow Creek, Kinley Creek
  - right: Green Valley Creek, Crab Creek, Holcomb Creek, Coxey Creek

National Wild and Scenic Rivers System
- Type: Wild, Scenic, Recreational
- Designated: March 12, 2019

Deep Creek is a tributary of the Mojave River, 23.4 miles (37.7 km) long, in San Bernardino County, California.

== Course ==
The source of Deep Creek is at an elevation of 7,512 feet (2,290 m), at the head of Little Green Valley in the San Bernardino Mountains. It initially flows southwest, through the communities of Arrowbear and Running Springs, before turning north. It is joined by Hooks Creek from the west; a dam on Little Bear Creek, a tributary of Hooks Creek, forms Lake Arrowhead. A short distance downstream is Aztec Falls, a popular swimming area at a waterfall along Deep Creek.

The creek continues north, at the bottom of a deep gorge through mountainous wilderness, receiving Holcomb Creek and Coxey Creek from the right before turning west, forming a canyon between the San Bernardino Mountains and Ord Mountains. The Deep Creek Hot Springs are located along the stream where it turns to the west. The Pacific Crest Trail follows the Deep Creek canyon for 16 miles (26 km), from the confluence of Hooks Creek to the mouth.

Deep Creek ends at its confluence with the West Fork Mojave River forming the Mojave River, at an elevation of 2,992 feet (912 m). The confluence is located 10 miles (16 km) southeast of Hesperia, directly behind Mojave Forks Dam, a flood-control structure built in 1974.

== Drainage basin ==
The Deep Creek drainage basin is 135 square miles (350 km^{2}) in size. Most of the drainage basin is located in the San Bernardino National Forest. For most of its length it is a remote, swift-flowing mountain stream, with a riverbed characterized by "deep pools and boulder strewn reaches". Deep Creek derives most of its water from snowmelt in the winter and spring, and has very low flows in autumn. The creek is also prone to flash flooding in the summer due to monsoon storms.

Deep Creek is one of the most ecologically diverse areas of the San Bernardino National Forest. At lower elevations, where the drainage approaches the Mojave Desert, the dominant vegetation type is chaparral, and creosote bush, chamise and California buckwheat are common. At middle elevations oak and pinyon-juniper woodland are common, with mixed conifer forests in the highest elevations. The endangered southwestern arroyo toad is found in the lower part of Deep Creek.

The creek is designated a Wild Trout Stream by the state of California, and is home to populations of rainbow and brown trout.

== See also ==
- List of rivers of California
