= List of places in California (I) =

List of places in California - I

This list of current:

- cities
- towns, unincorporated communities
- counties, and other recognized places in the U.S. state of California.

Information on the number and names of counties in which the place lies, and its lower and upper ZIP Code bounds, if applicable are also included.

Name of place	Number of counties	Principal county	Lower zip code	Upper zip code
Ibis	1	San Bernardino County		
Icaria	1	Sonoma County		
Iceland	1	Nevada County		
Idlewild	1	Placer County		
Idlewild	1	Tulare County	93260	
Idria	1	San Benito County	95023	
Idyllwild	1	Riverside County	92549	
Idyllwild-Pine Cove	1	Riverside County	92549	
Idylwood Acres	1	Contra Costa County	94596	
Igerna	1	Siskiyou County		
Ignacio	1	Marin County	94947	
Ignacio	1	Marin County	94947	
Igo	1	Shasta County	96047	
Imola	1	Napa County	94558	
Imperial	1	Imperial County	92251	
Imperial Beach	1	San Diego County	91932	33
Imperial Crest	1	Los Angeles County	90650	
Inaja-Cosmit Indian Reservation	1	San Diego County	92036	
Inca	1	Riverside County		
Incline	1	Mariposa County	95318	
Independence	1	Calaveras County		
Independence	1	Inyo County	93526	
Indian Falls	1	Plumas County	95971	
Indian Gulch	1	Mariposa County		
Indian Hill	1	Amador County		
Indian Hill	1	Imperial County		
Indian Mission	1	Fresno County	93602	
Indianola	1	Humboldt County	95524	
Indian Springs	1	Los Angeles County		
Indian Springs	1	Madera County		
Indian Springs	1	Mendocino County		
Indian Springs	1	San Diego County		
Indian Village	1	Inyo County		
Indian Wells	1	Riverside County	92210	
Indio	1	Riverside County	92201	03
Industrial	1	Los Angeles County		
Industrial	1	Orange County	92705	
Industry	1	Los Angeles County	91714	89
Ingle	1	Fresno County		
Inglenook	1	Mendocino County	95437	
Ingleside	1	San Francisco County		
Inglewood	1	Los Angeles County	90301	12
Ingomar	1	Merced County		
Ingot	1	Shasta County	96008	
Inskip	1	Butte County		
Interlaken	1	Santa Cruz County		
Inverness	1	Marin County	94937	
Inverness Park	1	Marin County	94956	
Inwood	1	Shasta County	96088	
Inyokern	1	Kern County	93527	
Ione	1	Amador County	95640	
Ione Band of Miwok Indians	1	Amador County		
Iowa City	1	Yuba County		
Iowa Hill	1	Placer County	95713	
Iremel	1	Santa Barbara County		
Irmulco	1	Mendocino County		
Iron Horse	1	Plumas County		
Iron Mountain	1	San Bernardino County	92280	
Iron Mountain	1	Shasta County		
Ironsides	1	Los Angeles County		
Irrigosa	1	Madera County		
Irvine	1	Orange County	92602	97
Irvings Crest	1	San Diego County		
Irvington	1	Alameda County	94538	
Irvington District	1	Alameda County		
Irwin	1	Merced County	95324	
Irwindale	1	Los Angeles County	91706	
Isabella	1	Kern County		
Island Mountain	1	Trinity County	95440	
Isla Vista	1	Santa Barbara County	93117	
Isleton	1	Sacramento County	95641	
Ivanhoe	1	Tulare County	93235	
Ivanpah	1	San Bernardino County	92366	
Ivesta	1	Fresno County		
Ivory	1	Tulare County		
