= Mojave Road =

Historical trails and roads

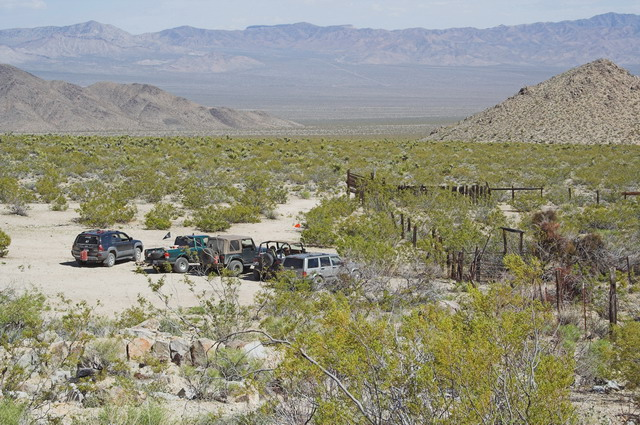
- Vehicles traveling the Mojave Road stop for a break at Marl Springs

- Location within California
- 35°N 115°W
- Location: Colorado River to Wilmington, Los Angeles, the end marker.

History
- Built: Prehistory

Site notes
- Architect: Mohave Indians
- Architectural style: Dirt Trail/Road – Route 66

California Historical Landmark
- Designated: 19 March 1985
- Reference no.: 963

U.S. National Register of Historic Places
- Designated: 27 September 2021
- Reference no.: 100007003

The Mojave Road, also known as Old Government Road (formerly the Mohave Trail), is a historic route and present day dirt road across what is now the Mojave National Preserve in the Mojave Desert in the United States. This rough road stretched 147 miles (237 km) from Beale's Crossing (the river crossing site on the west bank of the Colorado River, opposite old Fort Mohave, roughly 10 miles (16 km) southwest of Bullhead City, Arizona), to Fork of the Road location along the north bank of the Mojave River where the old Mojave Road split off from the route of the Old Spanish Trail/Mormon Road.

A four-wheel drive vehicle is required for all but a few short stretches of this road, which is unmaintained. The old road from Fork of the Road eastward along the Mojave River is interrupted after 10.9 acres (4.4 ha) by private property, below the site of the old Camp Cady (on the north bank of the Mojave River, roughly 12 miles (19 km) northeast of Newberry Springs). The road is resumed at an access point from the north in Manix Wash. Under optimal conditions, its full length of 133 miles (214 km) from Beale's Crossing to Manix Wash can be travelled in 2 to 3 days.

== History ==
=== Mohave Trail ===
A traditional thoroughfare of desert-dwelling Native Americans, the Mohave Trail ran between watering holes across the Mojave Desert between the Colorado River and Mojave River then following it to the Cajon Pass, the gap between the San Bernardino Mountains and San Gabriel Mountains, into Southern California ending at Drum Barracks. It ran westward between springs across the Mojave Desert, from Piute Spring to Indian Well, to Rock Springs, then to Marl Spring and Soda Spring on the west side of Soda Lake. From there the trail led to the mouth of the Mojave River southwest of Soda Lake. It then followed the river up stream, finding oases of water and vegetation where the river came to the surface at various places along its course. The watering holes recur at intervals of about 60 miles (97 km) to 70 miles (110 km).

The Spanish Franciscan missionary Francisco Garcés traveled the trail with Mohave guides, after leaving the expedition of Juan Bautista de Anza in 1776. José María de Zalvidea, the zealous Franciscan administrator of Mission San Gabriel also crossed the trail in 1806, reportedly converting five indigenous Mohaves near present-day Hesperia. The Mohave Trail later became the route of raiders, preying on the herds of the California missions and ranchos. Spanish (and later, Mexican) soldiers pursued the raiders along the route.

In 1826, Jedediah Smith led an expedition of the first US citizens to travel the Mojave Trail.

=== Old Spanish Trail ===
From 1829 to 1830, Mexican traders from New Mexico established the routes that came to be called the Old Spanish Trail trade route to California. The first of these, Armijo's route, intercepted the Mohave's trail at the mouth of the Mojave River near Soda Lake.

Subsequently, in 1830, the Mohave's trail became part of what became the Main Route or Central Route of the Old Spanish Trail, linking up with it from the north 12 miles (19 km) west of the Colorado River in Piute Valley and following it westward to the link up with Armijo's route at the Mojave River mouth, and later with a shortcut from Salt Spring through Bitter Spring and Spanish Canyon at a point just east of Yermo. This place was later called "Fork of the Road" where the Old Spanish Trail or from 1849, the Southern Route of the California Trail or the Mormon Road to Salt Lake City, divided from what came to be the Mojave Road to the Colorado River. From 1849, the Mormon Road became heavily traveled winter road to California by Forty-niners seeking to avoid the fate of the Donner Party, and subsequent travelers, post riders and commercial wagon freighters.

Now consolidated the Old Spanish Trail then followed the Mohave's trail along the Mojave River but instead of crossing over the mountains into San Bernardino Valley they followed a new route Armijo called "Cañon de San Bernardino" from the upper Mojave River west through Cajon Pass and down Crowder Canyon and Cajon Canyon, known to the vaqueros of the San Bernardino de Sena Estancia who had come to their aid with food.

=== Mojave Road ===
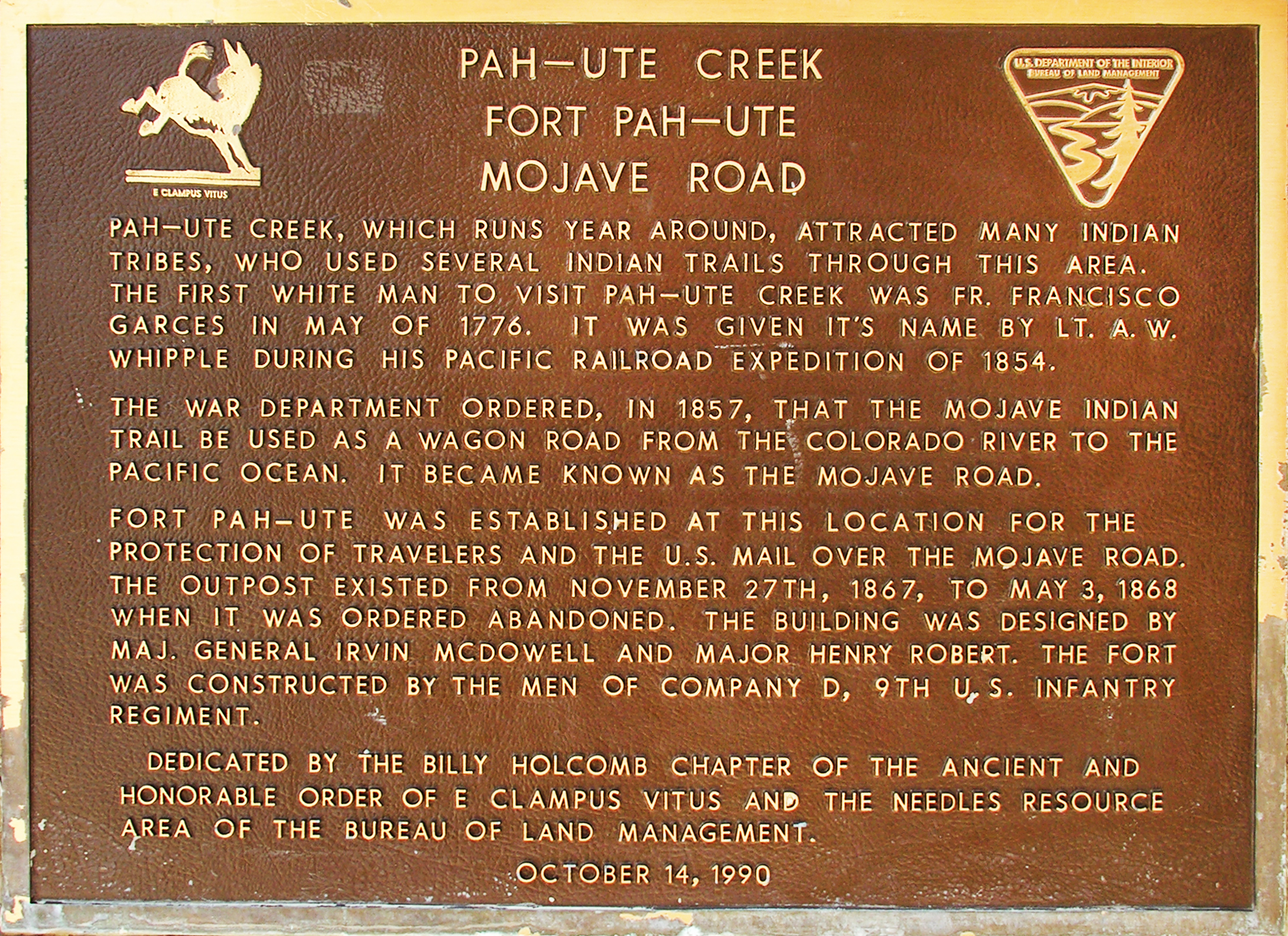
Mojave Road Plaque

The land was ceded from Mexico to the US in 1848 following the Mexican–American War. In early 1858 the Mohave Trail became the Mojave Road, a wagon road connected to the newly pioneered Beale's Wagon Road across northern New Mexico Territory from Fort Defiance to Beale's Crossing on the Colorado River where it linked up with the Mojave Road. This ran from the Colorado crossing to where it left the Mojave River, west of the vicinity of modern Barstow. Wagon trains of settlers coming west on the Santa Fe Trail soon followed Beale's Wagon Road and the Mojave Road into Southern California. Beale's road was shorter than the route via the more southern Southern Emigrant Trail and it was cooler in summer, snow-free in winter, had better forage, and was better watered. Soon hostilities began between the Mohaves and the settlers, triggering the Mohave War.

From the time of the Mohave War the Mohave Road came under the purview of the U.S. government. Army posts were established at Fort Mojave, at Beale's Crossing in 1859, and, after the Bitter Spring Expedition at Camp Cady, 10.9 miles (17.5 km) east of Fork of the Road at its junction with the Mormon Road, in 1860. Smaller outposts were established later in the 1860s east of Camp Cady along the trail and regular patrols instituted. The army protected the settlers and travelers from the attacks of the resident Paiute, Mojave, and Chemehuevi Native Americans until 1871. This also opened the way for large mining development in the Mojave Desert region of San Bernardino County and agricultural development in the Victor Valley area.

During the Colorado River Gold Rush from 1862 it became one of the major roads to the gold and silver mining regions on the upper river and linked by the Hardyville - Prescott Road in 1864 to the mining regions in northern and central Arizona.

== The route today ==
The eastern end of the Mojave Road begins at the edge of the Colorado River, near the site of Beale's Crossing, north of Needles and the western terminus lies beyond the Rasor Off-Highway Vehicle Area and the Afton Canyon Natural Area near the Manix Wash.

=== Landmarks ===
The following list of markers follows east to west travel.

- The Colorado River – Where the trail begins, near Beale's Crossing on the west side of the river across the river from what became the site of Fort Mohave. (mile 0) 35.046280°N 114.627890°W
- Beaver Lake – A lake, sometimes a slough of the Colorado River during spring floods. The original road passed the lake on the north 2.5 miles (4.0 km) – 3 miles (4.8 km) from the river crossing, in the 19th century. The Mohave War Battle of Beaver Lake was fought there just north of the lake. In the 20th century, cutoff from the spring floods of the river by the construction of dams above it, Beaver Lake dried up, becoming playa, desert or farmland. The modern trail cuts across the middle of this former water feature. 35.070010°N 114.639990°W
- Piute Creek – With Piute Spring, a natural spring, as its source, a desert oasis with trees and plants growing all year round, in the Piute Range. (mile 23) 35.115020°N 114.985260°W
- Fort Piute – Next to the mouth of Piute Creek where the oasis ends, this fort was built in 1867 by the US infantry, one of several to guard the Government Road between Fort Mohave and San Bernardino. (mile 23) 35.115020°N 114.985260°W
- Lanfair Valley – Cattle ranches have been here since 1880. (mile 34) 35.094780°N 115.019520°W
- Indian Hill 35.143530°N 115.154260°W, Indian Well 35.145278°N 115.158889°W – About a mile north of the Mojave Road at mile 40, there is Indian Hill, the summit on the south end of the Lanfair Buttes. Indian Well an old well of debatable origin lies to the northwest of Indian Hill.(mile 40)
- Joshua Tree Forest – The road gets very narrow in this thick forest in Lanfair Valley. (mile 47) 35.143340°N 115.291460°W
- Rock Spring – The biggest watering hole along the Mojave Road. The stream flows down large boulders. There is an old cabin here. (mile 49) 35.152830°N 115.327300°W
- Government Holes – Another water supply in Round Valley, west of Rock Spring, with an old concrete trough. (mile 52) 35.147490°N 115.359200°W
- Cedar Canyon – The highest point of the trip, crossing the Mid Hills you will reach 5,000 ft (1,500 m) elevation. (mile 56) 35.152900°N 115.362000°W
- Kelso-Cima Road – In the middle of the trip, this is the last paved road you will see for a long time (mile 62) 35.176210°N 115.509010°W
- Marl Spring – Another spring with a primitive concrete trough. (mile 70) 35.170700°N 115.647590°W
- Mojave Road Mail Box – Sign your name at this solitary flagpole and continue on. (mile 74) 35.185400°N 115.692840°W
- Willow Wash – A wash with heavy sands south and west of the Cima Volcanic Range and Volcanic_Fields, parallels Kelbaker Rd. to where it breaks up into distributary washes beyond Seventeen Mile Point. (mile 77) 35.162850°N 115.842090°W
- Kelbaker Road – The section of the paved road between Baker and Kelso Junction.35.2226°N 115.8789°W
- Seventeen Mile Point – Mountain marking the halfway point between Soda Spring and Marl Spring. Site of Seventeen Mile Point mining camp. 35.22165°N 115.89296°W
- Soda Lake – A large dry lake; proceed with caution. You may have to drive around in the winter. (mile 97) 35.152410°N 116.052710°W
- Soda Springs in (Zzyzx) – Small private building on the edge of Soda Lake. 35.142790°N 116.104740°W
- Travelers Monument – Also known as Government Monument, travelers carry a rock across the dry lake and add it to the pile. (mile 100) 35.130840°N 116.095270°W
- Rasor OHV Area – Open use area. (mile 103) 35.108780°N 116.143630°W
- Sand Dunes – There are a few soft sand dunes along here that you can play on. (mile 106) 35.080507°N 116.193786°W
- Afton Canyon – Deep canyon with steep walls, riparian habitat restoration, and plenty of scenery. (mile 116) 35.042720°N 116.309500°W
- Mojave River crossing – The only water crossing on this trail. (mile 121) 35.037740°N 116.381120°W
- Manix Wash – The exit point of the Mojave Road. (mile 133) 34.974380°N 116.540800°W
- Camp Cady – a former U.S. Army Camp along the old Mojave Road, on the Mojave River (mile 136.1) 34.946111°N 116.589444°W
- Fork of the Road – Location along the north bank of the Mojave River were the old Mojave Road split off from the route of the Old Spanish Trail/Mormon Road east of Yermo. (mile 147) 34.901389°N 116.759722°W
- Drum Barracks the end of the trail in the west in Wilmington, Los Angeles. 33.78466°N 118.258163°W

== Historic designations ==
Mojave Road Los Angeles became a California Historic Landmark (No.963) on 19 March 1985, and was listed on the National Register of Historic Places in 2021. California Historic Marker reads:

- NO. 963 THE MOJAVE ROAD – Long ago, Mohave Indians used a network of pathways to cross the Mojave Desert. In 1826, American trapper Jedediah Smith used their paths and became the first non-Indian to reach the California coast overland from mid-America. The paths were worked into a military wagon road in 1859. This "Mojave Road" remained a major link between Los Angeles and points east until a railway crossed the desert in 1885.

Camp Cady also is a California Historical Landmark Marker #963-1 on the site reads:

- NO. 963-1 Camp Cady was located on the Mojave Road which connected Los Angeles to Albuquerque. Non-Indian travel on this and the nearby Salt Lake Road was beset by Paiutes, Mohaves, and Chemehuevis defending their homeland. To protect both roads, Camp Cady was established by U.S. Dragoons in 1860. The main building was a stout mud redoubt. Improved camp structures were built 1/2-mile west in 1868. After peace was achieved, the military withdrew in 1871. This protection provided by Camp Cady enabled travelers, merchandise, and mail using both roads to boost California's economy and growth.

== See also ==
- California Historical Landmarks in San Bernardino County, California
- California Historical Landmarks in Los Angeles County
- Category: Mountain ranges of the Mojave Desert
- Category: Protected areas of the Mojave Desert
- Desert Region of California
