= Indian Hills High School =

Indian Hills High School may refer to:

- Indian Hills High School (Calabasas, California)
- Indian Hills High School (New Jersey)
