= West Fork Mojave River =

River in California, United States

West Fork Mojave River is a 12-mile-long (19 km) tributary stream of the Mojave River in the San Bernardino Mountains of San Bernardino County, California. Its mouth lies at an elevation of 2,986 feet (910 meters) at its confluence with Deep Creek, together the source of the Mojave River. The source of the West Fork is at 34°15′52″N 117°24′01″W at an elevation of 4,960 feet, on the north side of a saddle between summits on a ridge running west northwest of Sugarpine Mountain. Sawpit Canyon Creek and East Fork of West Fork Mojave River are its tributaries, both of which now feed into Silverwood Lake that was created when the West Fork was obstructed by the Cedar Springs Dam in 1971.

== History ==
The Mohave Trail from the Colorado River crossed the Mojave Desert, then followed the Mojave River, and West Fork Mojave River up to Sawpit Canyon and up it to cross the San Bernardino Mountains at Monument Peak to the coastal plains of Southern California.
