= Fort Atkinson (Kansas) =

Coordinates: 37.7530°N 100.0833°W

Fort Atkinson, Kansas
- 2 miles (3.2 km) west of Dodge City, Kansas

Site information
- Type: U.S. Army fort
- Controlled by: U.S. Army

Site history
- Built: August 1850
- In use: August 1850 - September 1853, June 1854 - October 1854
- Materials: sod, canvas

Garrison information
- Past commanders: Brevet 2nd Lieut. A. H. Plummer, Maj. Albemarle Cady
- Garrison: varied, but averaged 140 men

Fort Atkinson, 2 miles (3.2 km) west of Dodge City, had two lives. One life occurred before Kansas became a territory in 1854. The original Fort Atkinson was established August 8, 1850, by the U.S. Army in an attempt to prevent Indians in the area from attacking travelers on the Santa Fe Trail. Even before this, a site nearby was occupied in July 1850 by Lieut. Col. Edwin Vose Sumner, Who served as a Union major general in the Civil War. This first site was called Camp Mackay or Fort Mackay. Later the camp was moved to the site where it was permanently established. Sod buildings with canvas roofs were constructed. This post was abandoned in September 1853 and the buildings were torn down so Indians could not hide inside them and surprise travelers on the Trail.

A railroad survey squad, led by a captain, said, "The bluffs are low, and the country on all sides unbroken prairie, without timber even on the river bottom." Gwinn H. Heap, who visited the post in 1853, wrote the nearest trees were fifteen miles away. Water was ample, however, since Fort Atkinson was bounded on the south by the Arkansas River.

The most important event occurring at Fort Atkinson was the signing of a treaty. On July 27, 1853, a major treaty was ratified between the U.S. government and the Apache, Comanche and Kiowa tribes in the area. By 1853 the plains tribes were starting to feel the encroachment of whites onto their lands. The treaty had a number of provisions to protect those traveling through the area. In summary, the treaty was to allow for roads to be used and for military posts and such like settlements to be constructed on Indian lands. The tribes involved were to refrain from making incursions into Mexico or to take property or captives from Mexican provinces. Any wrongs committed by the Indians were to be remedied by restitution and any captives were to be freed. As compensation the Indians were to be given annuities for a period of time. Any breaches of the treaty by the Indians could result in reductions to the annuities paid.

This treaty was at times violated by both the Indians and by whites. The treaty became unenforceable by the late 1850s, when whites flooded the area on their way to find gold in Colorado and Montana.

Shortly after the post was abandoned, efforts were made to reestablish it. In February 1854 the New Mexico territorial legislature requested Congress to reestablish Fort Atkinson. It appeared no action would be taken to do this. Secretary of War Jefferson Davis, the future Confederate president, wrote in a letter May 20, 1854, that he considered the resurrection of the fort to be too costly and impractical.

However, Fort Atkinson was reestablished on June 13, 1854. Eight officers and 110 enlisted men from Fort Riley reestablished the post adjacent to its original site. Maj. Albemarle Cady was the commander through Fort Atkinson's second life. The troops lived in tents and no buildings were constructed. They protected a mail station and aided travelers. Approximately 140 men were at the post, but they were unable to do much to help travelers.

A great gathering of the Comanches and Kiowas in the region came to Fort Atkinson in July to receive their annuities, although they still had captives and animals that were not legally theirs. The Indian agent, J. W. Whitfield, distributed at least some of the annuities.

The post did not last long after this gathering. Cady filed the last field return for the post in October 1854. His return said of the closing of the fort, "This post abandoned Oct. 2/54."
