= Round Valley (Pinto Mountain) =

Valley south of Pinto Mountain

- Location within southern California
- Floor elevation: 5,010 ft (1,530 m)

Geography
- Location: United States, California, San Bernardino County, Mojave National Preserve
- Coordinates: 35°09′06″N 115°21′43″W
- Interactive map of Round Valley

Round Valley is a valley south of Pinto Mountain within the Mojave National Preserve in San Bernardino County, California. It has an elevation of 5,010 feet (1,530 meters).
