= Lanfair Buttes =

Lanfair Buttes, also known as Eagle Mountain, Indian Hill, Eagle Hill, and Graveyard Hills is a summit in the Mojave National Preserve in the Mojave Desert in San Bernardino County, California. The Lanfair Buttes lie 3 miles (4.8 km) east-southeast of the Grotto Hills and 8 miles (13 km) north-northeast of Hackberry Mountain in Lanfair Valley. The tallest and northernmost elevation in the Lanfair Buttes is Eagle Mountain at 1338 feet. The southernmost elevation is Indian Hill, at 35°08′36.71″N 115°09′15.34″W at an elevation of 1281 feet. Indian Well, an old well is found west of the Buttes at 35°08′43″N 115°09′32″W, and petroglyphs are found nearby on the slope of the Buttes to the east. Indian Well petroglyphs indicate it was a Native American water source and camping site in previous centuries. Indian Well was also located along the route of the Mohave Trail.

The Lanfair Buttes are a landmark, found about a mile north of the Mojave Road at mile 40.
