= Manix Wash =

Tributary stream of the Mojave River in California

Manix Wash is a 2.5 mile long tributary stream of the Mojave River, in San Bernardino County, California. Its mouth lies at an elevation of 1,621 feet / 494 meters at its confluence with the river. Its source lies at an elevation of 1740 feet at 34°59′45″N 116°34′43″W in the Mojave Valley.
