= Silverwood Lake =

Reservoir in the San Bernardino Mountains of California, United States

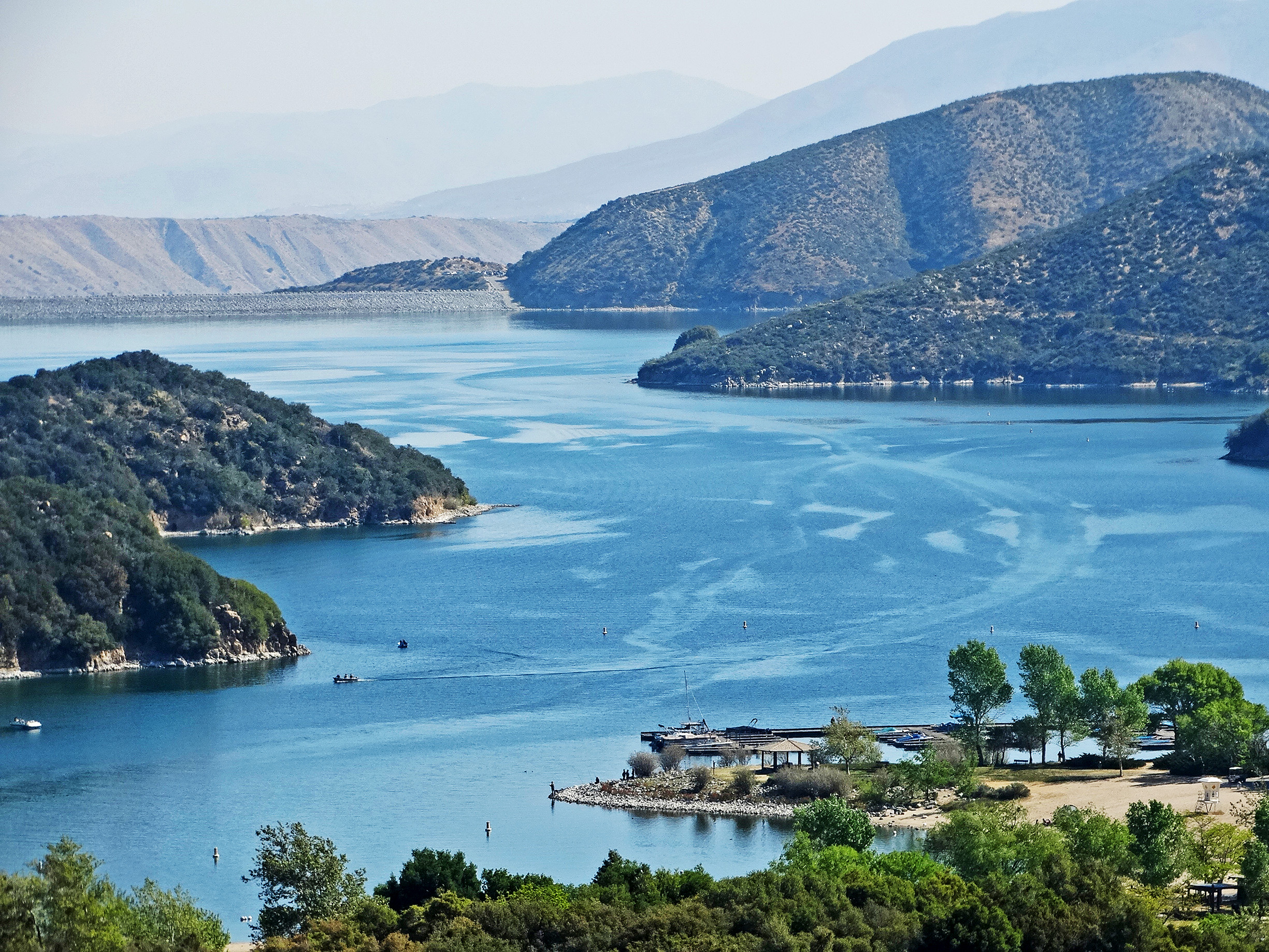
- Looking north, Cedar Springs Dam at top left

- Location within southern California Location within California
- Location: San Bernardino County, California
- Coordinates: 34°18′14″N 117°19′05″W
- Type: Reservoir
- Primary inflows: California Aqueduct and West Fork Mojave River, East Fork of West Fork Mojave River and Sawpit Canyon Creek
- Primary outflows: West Fork Mojave River
- Basin countries: United States
- Water volume: 73,000 acre-feet (90×10^{6} m^{3})
- Surface elevation: 1,023 m (3,356 ft)

Silverwood Lake is a large reservoir in San Bernardino County, California, United States, located on the West Fork Mojave River, a tributary of the Mojave River in the San Bernardino Mountains. It was created in 1971 (55 years ago) as part of the State Water Project by the construction of the Cedar Springs Dam as a forebay on the 444 mi (715 km) long California Aqueduct (consequently inundating the former town of Cedar Springs) and has a capacity of 73,000 acre⋅ft (90,000,000 m^{3}).

== Specifications ==
Silverwood Lake is located on the East Branch of the California Aqueduct. It is operated by the California Department of Water Resources and provides a major water source for agencies serving nearby San Bernardino Mountain and Mojave Desert areas. Some 2,400 acres (9.7 km^{2}) of recreation land surround the lake.

At an elevation of 3,355 ft (1,023 m), Silverwood Lake is the highest reservoir in the State Water Project.

== Silverwood Lake State Recreation Area ==
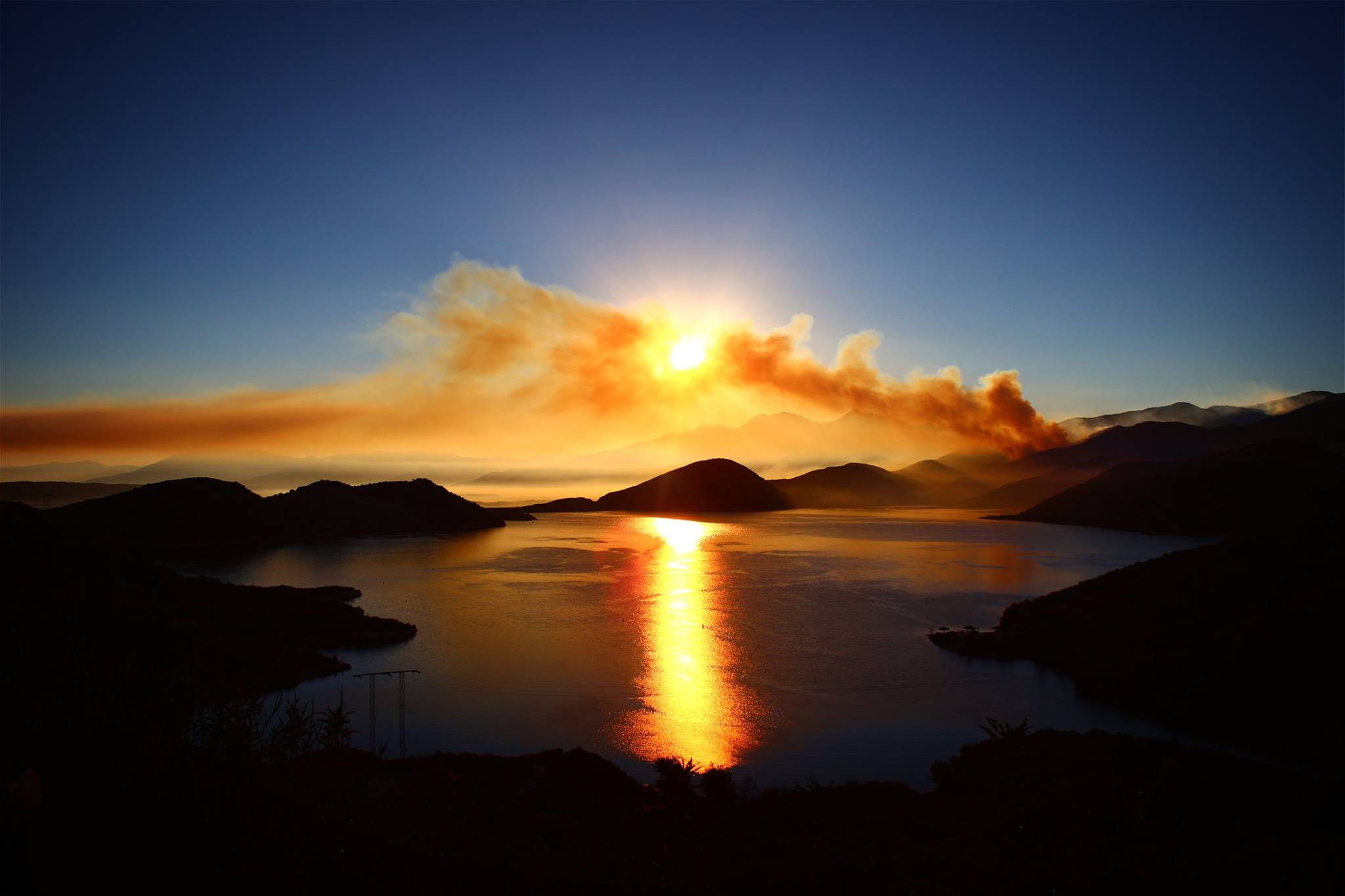
Sunrise through the smoke of the Pilot Fire in Silverwood Lake State Recreation Area

The Silverwood Lake State Recreation Area is one of many California State Parks features picnicking, hiking trails, swimming beaches, and designated areas for boating, water-skiing and fishing.

The Pacific Crest Trail, "the jewel in the crown of America's scenic trails" spanning 2,650 mi (4,260 km) from Mexico to Canada through three western states, passes through the Silverwood Lake State Recreation Area, with trailheads for short or long hikes.

A 2009 California Water Board study found significantly elevated levels of toxic poly-chlorinated biphenyls (PCBS) and mercury levels in largemouth bass at Silverwood Reservoir.

This has prompted local media to express concerns over the large number of anglers keeping and eating fish from this popular Inland Empire lake. The California Office of Environmental Health Hazard Assessment (OEHHA) has developed a safe eating advisory for fish caught in the lake based on levels of mercury or PCBs found in local species.

== See also ==
- List of dams and reservoirs in California
- List of lakes in California
- Category: San Bernardino Mountains
- Category: Geography of San Bernardino County, California
