= Camp Cady =

Historic U.S. Army Camp in California

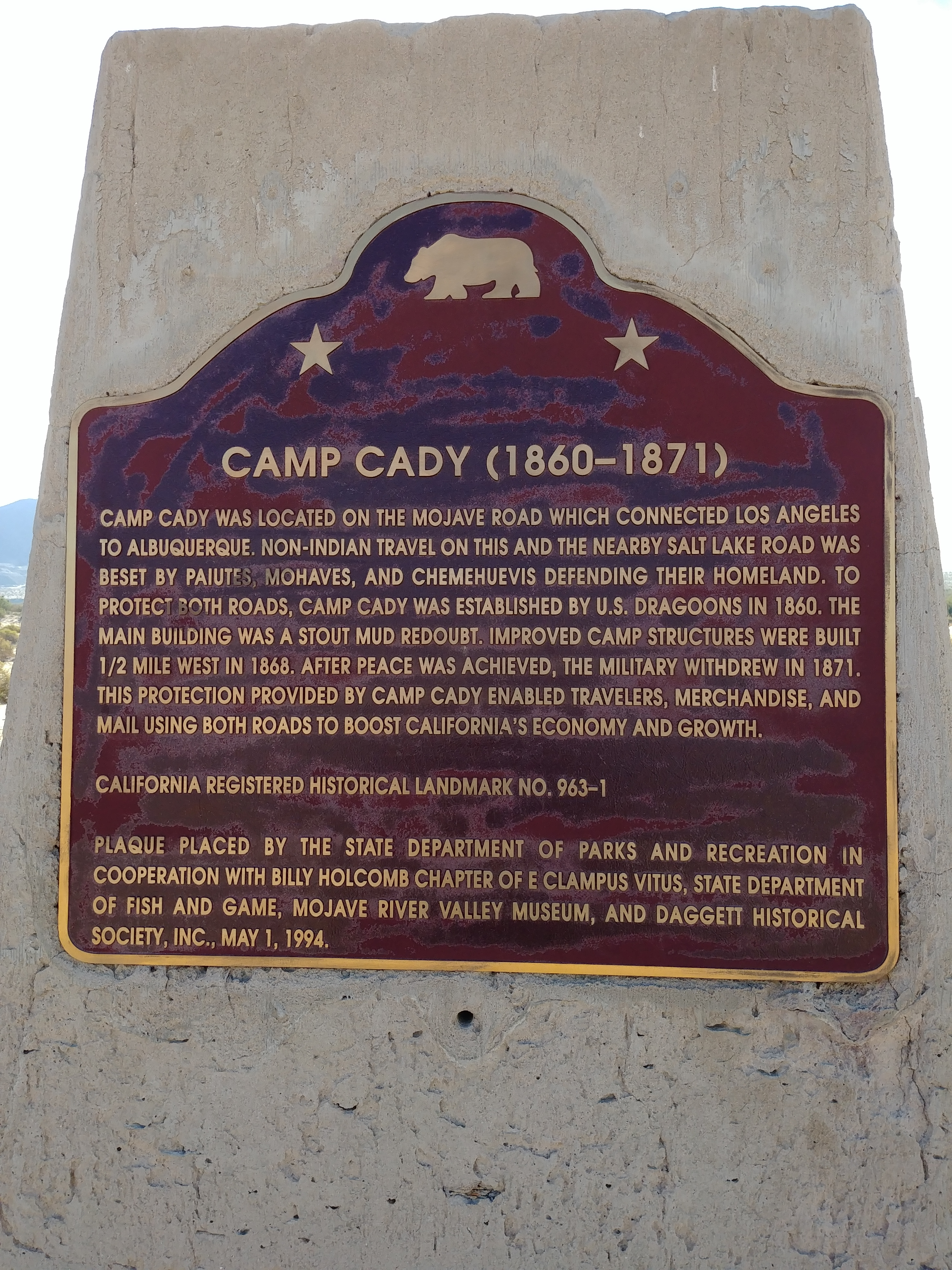
- Camp Cady Marker

- Location within California
- 34°56′42″N 116°35′57″W
- Location: 24 Miles N of Barstow, California

History
- Built: 1860

Site notes
- Governing body: State of California Department of Fish & Game

California Historical Landmark
- Designated: March 19, 1985
- Reference no.: 963-1

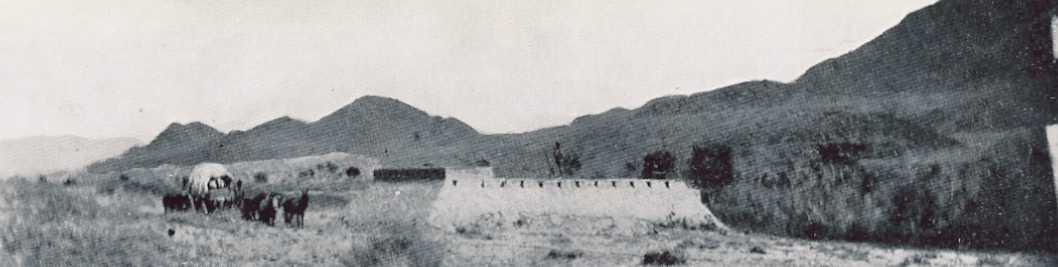
Camp Cady, California, in 1865

Camp Cady (1860–1861, 1866–1871) was a U.S. Army Camp, on the Mojave Road near the Mojave River in the Mojave Desert, located about 20 miles east of modern-day Barstow, California, in San Bernardino County, at an elevation of 1690 feet. Camp Cady was named after Major Albemarle Cady, 6th Infantry Regiment, who was a friend of Carleton and commander at Fort Yuma in 1860.

== History ==
Camp Cady was established during the Bitter Spring Expedition in 1860, by Major James H. Carleton, and Company K, 1st U.S. Dragoons, as a base camp for Carleton's campaign to punish Paiute who had attacked travelers at Bitter Spring on the Los Angeles - Salt Lake Road.

After the Bitter Spring Expedition, Camp Cady was garrisoned off and on until it was abandoned for a time in early part of the American Civil War after Fort Mohave was abandoned in May 1861. Sometimes used by California Volunteers patrolling the area in 1862, it was used by them after Fort Mohave was re-garrisoned in 1863 to guard the Mojave Road until the end of the Civil War. It was later garrisoned by the U. S. Army as one of a number of posts on the Mojave Road to protect travelers on the road from Paiute attacks along the road, from 1866 to 1871, when it was abandoned, after the Paiute were deemed pacified.

== The site today ==
At the site of Camp Cady there remain some ruins and a historical marker east of Barstow, within the Camp Cady Wildlife Area.

== California Historical Landmark ==
California Historical Landmark Marker Camp Cady #963-1 on the site reads:

- NO. 963-1 Camp Cady was located on the Mojave Road which connected Los Angeles to Albuquerque. Non-Indian travel on this and the nearby Salt Lake Road was beset by Paiutes, Mohaves, and Chemehuevis defending their homeland. To protect both roads, Camp Cady was established by U.S. Dragoons in 1860. The main building was a stout mud redoubt. Improved camp structures were built 1/2 mile west in 1868. After peace was achieved, the military withdrew in 1871. This protection provided by Camp Cady enabled travelers, merchandise, and mail using both roads to boost California's economy and growth.

- Marker 963 at the end of the Mojave Road reads:
- NO. 963 THE MOJAVE ROAD - Long ago, Mohave Indians used a network of pathways to cross the Mojave Desert. In 1826, American trapper Jedediah Smith used their paths and became the first non-Indian to reach the California coast overland from mid-America. The paths were worked into a military wagon road in 1859. This "Mojave Road" remained a major link between Los Angeles and points east until a railway crossed the desert in 1885.

== See also ==
- California Historical Landmarks in San Bernardino County, California
- California Historical Landmarks in Los Angeles County
- Mojave Road Los Angeles California Historical Landmark 963
