= Indian Hill (Lanfair Buttes) =

Coordinates: 35°08′36.71″N 115°09′15.34″W

Indian Hill as it is known informally, is the southernmost summit of the Lanfair Buttes in the Mojave National Preserve in the Mojave Desert in San Bernardino County, California. It rises to an elevation of 1281 feet.
