= Mojave River =

River in California, United States

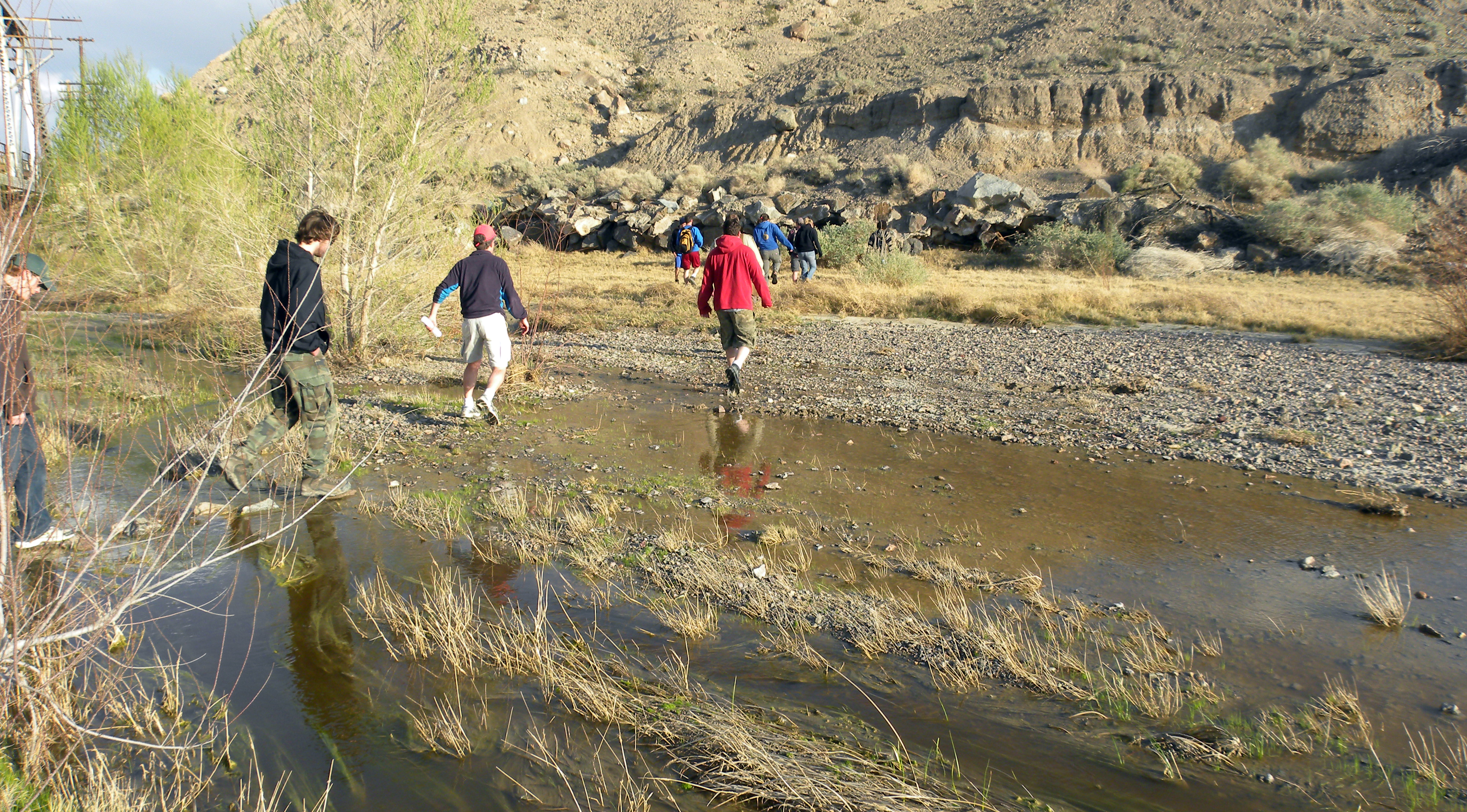
- Mojave River at Afton Canyon, March 2010

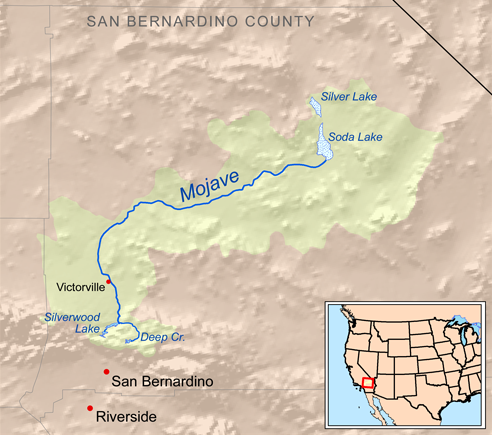
- Map of the Mojave River watershed

Location
- Country: United States
- State: California
- Cities: Hesperia, Apple Valley, Victorville, Barstow

Physical characteristics
- Source: Confluence of West Fork Mojave River and Deep Creek
  - location: Mojave River Forks Reservoir, San Bernardino Mountains
  - coordinates: 34°20′29″N 117°14′14″W
  - elevation: 2,986 ft (910 m)
- Mouth: Soda Lake
  - location: Baker, Mojave Desert
  - coordinates: 35°06′20″N 116°03′53″W
  - elevation: 935 ft (285 m)
- Length: 110 mi (180 km)
- Basin size: 4,580 sq mi (11,900 km^{2})
- Discharge
  - location: Lower Narrows, near Victorville
  - average: 65.7 cu ft/s (1.86 m^{3}/s)
  - minimum: 0 cu ft/s (0 m^{3}/s)
  - maximum: 70,600 cu ft/s (2,000 m^{3}/s)

Basin features
- Tributaries
  - left: Oro Grande Wash, Fremont Wash, Buckhorn Wash, Manix Wash
  - right: Bell Mountain Wash, Stoddard Wash, Daggett Wash

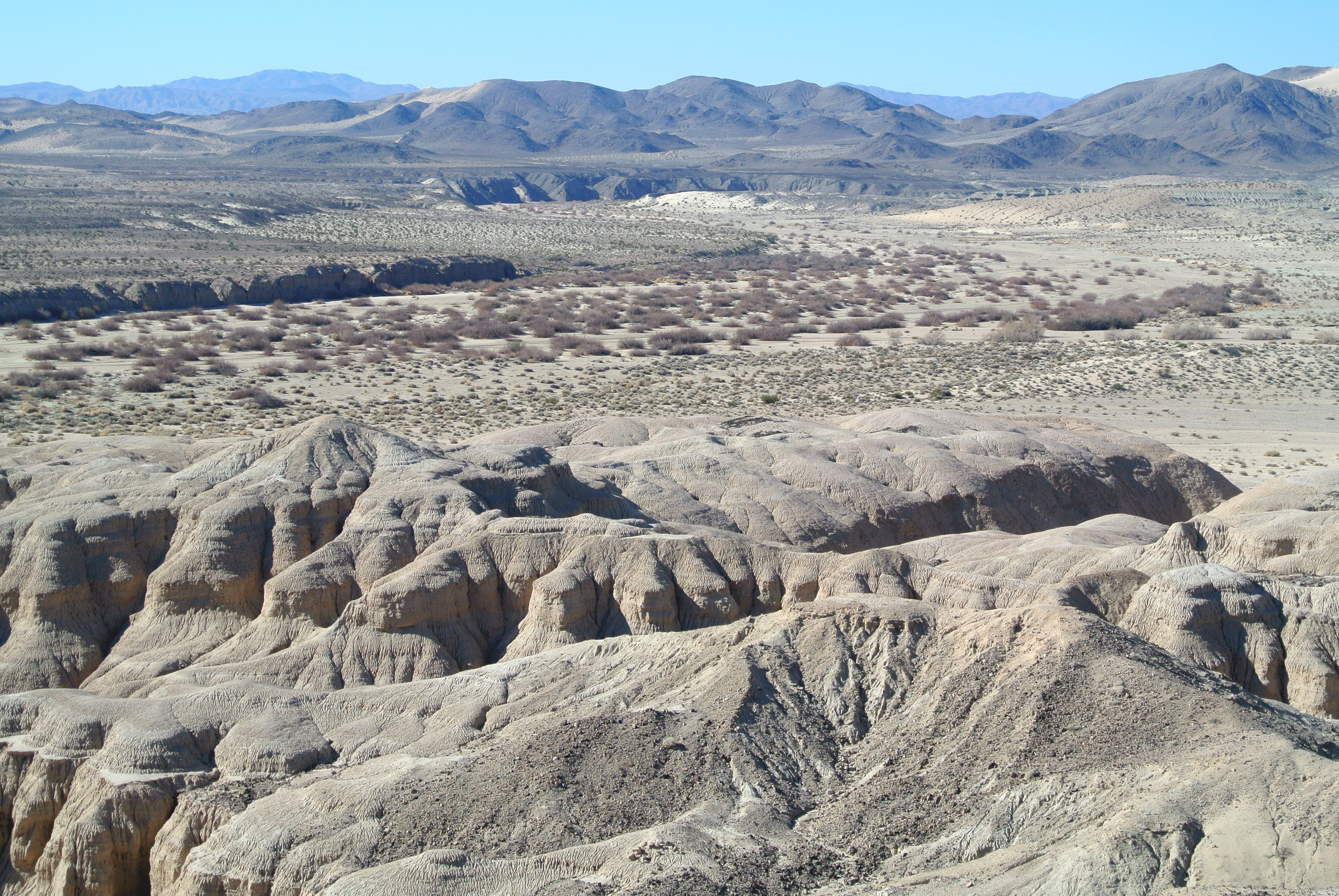
Mojave River cutting through Lake Manix sediments.

The Mojave River is an intermittent river in the eastern San Bernardino Mountains and the Mojave Desert in San Bernardino County, California, United States. Most of its flow is underground, while its surface channels remain dry most of the time, except for the headwaters and several bedrock gorges in the lower reaches.

== History ==
A desert branch of the Serrano Native Americans called the Vanyume or Beñemé, as Father Garcés called them, lived beyond and along much of the length of the Mojave River, from east of Barstow to at least the Victorville region, and perhaps even farther upstream to the south, for up to 8,000 years in a series of villages, including the major village of Wá'peat.

The Mohave's trail, later the European immigrants' Mojave Road, ran west from their villages on the Colorado River to Soda Lake, then paralleled the river from its mouth on the lake to the Cajon Pass. Native Americans used this trade route where water could easily be found en route to the coast. Garcés explored the length of the Mojave River in early 1776. He called the river Arroyo de los Mártires ("river of the martyrs") on March 9, 1776, but later Spaniards called it Río de las Ánimas ("spirit river or river of the (lost) souls"). In 1826 Jedediah Smith was the first non-Native American to travel overland to California by following the Mojave Indian Trail. He called this the Inconstant River.

A pack horse and livestock trail, the Old Spanish Trail, was established by Antonio Armijo in 1829 between New Mexico and El Pueblo de Los Ángeles, joined the Mojave River at its mouth near what is now Soda Lake. It followed the river to where the trail reached the foot of the mountains at Summit Valley and turned westward to pass over Cajon Pass and descend into the coastal valleys of southern Alta California. In 1830, Wolfskill and Yount pioneered what became the Main Route of the Old Spanish Trail, which followed a different route than Armijo, farther south just west of the Colorado River and then followed Jedediah Smith's path on the old Mohave Trail west to the Mojave River mouth at Soda Lake, to meet with Armijo's route coming south from Salt Spring.

Sometime before 1844, a cutoff developed on the Old Spanish Trail that cut the distance traveled along the upper river by cutting across what is now Victor Valley, from the Cajon Pass to a crossing just below the Lower Narrows of the river. John C. Frémont intercepted this route to the river, riding east southeast from Lake Elizabeth, north of the foot of the San Gabriel Mountains on April 20, 1844.

Frémont named the river Mohahve after the Mohave people on April 23, 1844, although these people lived two mountain ranges away on the Colorado River. He had met six traveling Mohaves that day. Some early Mormon ranchers called it the Macaby River. Additionally another cutoff to the Old Spanish Trail had developed before 1844, where the trail forked northeastward from the Mojave River and Mohave Trail, east of what is now Yermo, California running over Alvord Mountain, to Bitter Spring, then through Red Pass, to join the Armijo route near Salt Spring in the Silurian Valley. The fork of the trails there on the Mojave River, later became known as Fork of the Road.

From 1847, Mormons pioneered the wagon road that became the Mormon Road from Salt Lake City to Los Angeles, closely following the route of the Old Spanish Trail from Parowan, Utah. They followed the Mojave River from the Fork of the Road to the Lower Narrows and left the river for the Cajon Pass on the route Frémont had found. In 1849, Forty-niners late on the main trail to California used the Mormon Road as a winter alternative route to California, referring to it as the "Southern Route" of the California Trail. Later, emigrants to California followed the same route during the winter months. In 1855, the Mormon Road was improved, and the route changed in places, becoming a major commercial wagon route between Utah and southern California, ending Utah's winter isolation until the railroads arrived there in 1869.

In 1859, as part of the Mohave War, the Mohave people's trail was improved as the wagon route of the Mojave Road. It followed the Mojave River from where the Mormon Road turned north away from the river at Fork of the Road, near Daggett, to where historic Camp Cady was located. It then followed the river to Soda Lake, where the road turned eastward to Fort Mojave, and in 1862 following the gold and silver strikes on the Colorado River, to Hardyville and the mining districts near it, and its connection at the head of the toll road to Prescott and the mines in the interior of Arizona Territory.

From 1863 to 1864, the Mojave River valley was a refuge from the great drought in California in those years; cattle of some resourceful ranchers of southern California were preserved by its resources.

== Course ==
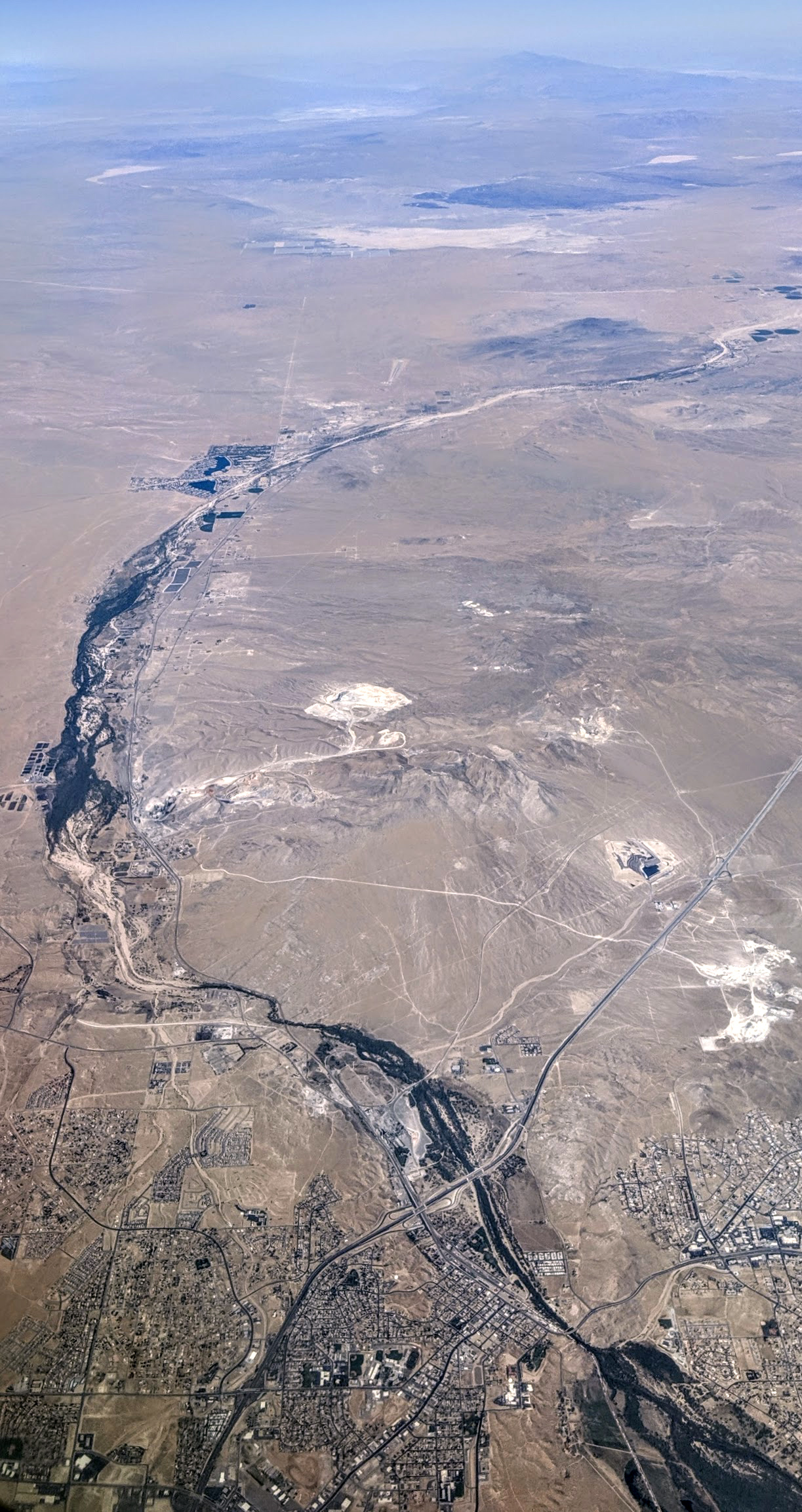
Aerial view of the Mojave River from Victorville (bottom) to Johnstons Corner near Barstow (top)

The river's source is at 34°15′52″N 117°24′01″W at an elevation of 4,960 feet in the San Bernardino Mountains, one of the Transverse Ranges, above Hesperia-San Bernardino. The West Fork Mojave River flows into Silverwood Lake, formed by Cedar Springs Dam, which overflows in the Mojave River Forks Reserve area. On occasion, the lake releases water into the river. Downstream, Deep Creek meets the West Fork, forming the Mojave River mainstem immediately upstream of the Mojave Forks Dam, which provides flood control. Downstream of the dam, the Mojave River flows north and east, underground in most places, through Hesperia, Victorville, and Barstow.

Near its terminus, the Mojave River flows out onto a large inland delta called the Mojave River Wash at the western edge of Mojave National Preserve. During heavy flows, the river reaches Soda Lake near Baker at the north end of Wash, and has reached Silver Lake, even further north, in historic times. For example, during the unusually wet winter of 2004–2005, the Mojave River flowed on the surface to Silver Lake and filled both Soda and Silver Lakes to a depth of several feet. A shallow pass, around 30 feet in height, separates Silver Lake from the Silurian Valley that contains Salt Creek, a tributary of the Amargosa River and thus the Death Valley drainage basin.

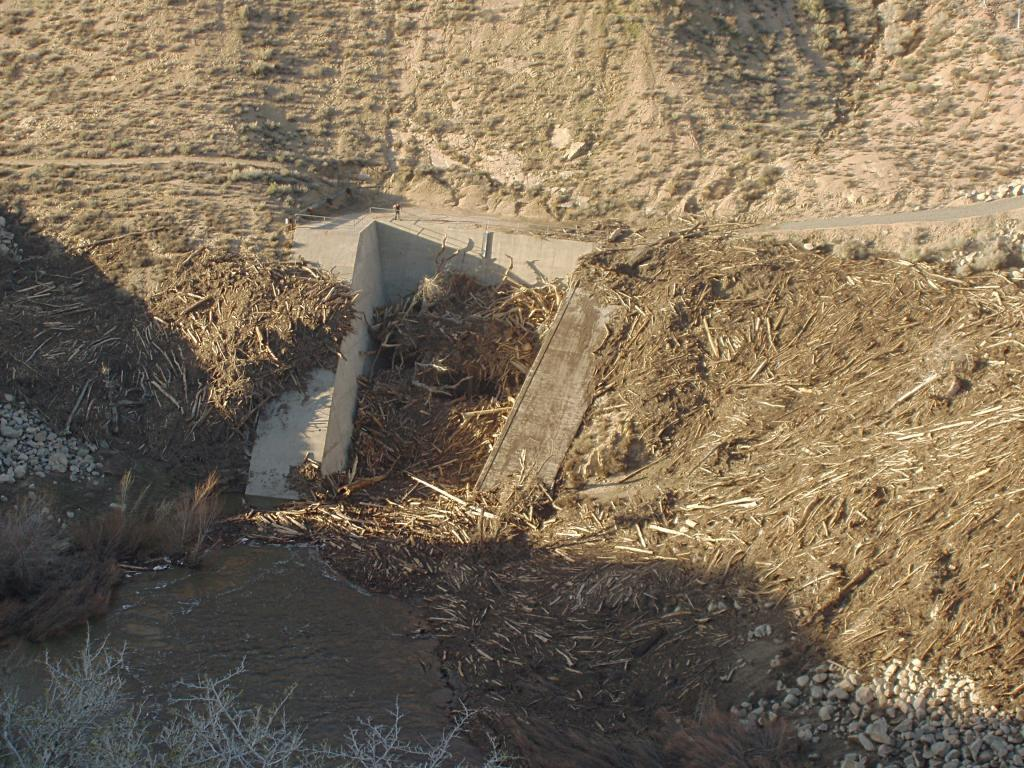
Mojave River Dam Outlet

The water in the river is mostly underground. The channel at the surface remains dry most of the time, but extreme flooding is possible. For example, during a heavy El Niño in the Mojave Desert, rains caused the Mojave River to overflow onto overpassing bridges on February 22, 1993, the most damaged being on Bear Valley Road, where Victorville and Apple Valley are separated. The water comes to the surface only in areas with impermeable rock, such as the upper and lower narrows near Victorville and in the Afton Canyon area northeast of Barstow.

== Afton Canyon Natural Area ==
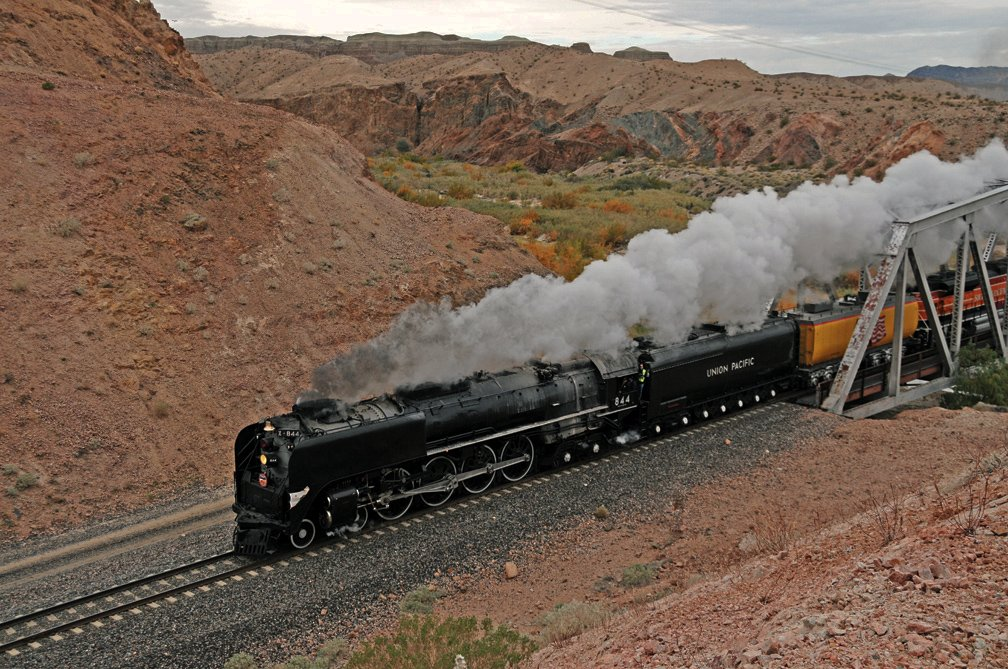
Union Pacific 844 pulls a steam excursion train crossing Afton Canyon, 2011.

The Afton Canyon Natural Area is within Mojave Trails National Monument, and is managed by the Bureau of Land Management. It is located 37 mi (60 km) northeast of Barstow along Interstate 15 between the Afton Road and Basin Road exits.

Afton Canyon is designated as an Area of Critical Environmental Concern to protect plant and wildlife habitat, and to preserve scenic values of the Mojave River's riparian area within the canyon. The Rasor Off-Highway Vehicle Area boundary enforcement has begun to reverse the heavy off-road vehicles use and damage that occurred in the riverbed and canyon. Restoration projects are ongoing and have already brought the river's "proper functioning condition" from a "non-functioning" to a "functioning at risk" status. The objectives of the ambitious restoration project are to control exotic plants, particularly the phreatophyte Saltcedar - Tamarix (primarily Tamarix ramosissima and Tamarix parviflora), and restoring critical desert California native plant community "structural elements" for a functioning flora and fauna habitat.

== See also ==
- Mojave Narrows Park
- Deep Creek Hot Springs

== Bibliography ==
- Philip Stoffer (14 January 2004). "Changing Climates and Ancient Lakes" (.html). Desert Landforms and Surface Processes in the Mojave National Preserve and Vicinity. Open-File Report 2004-1007. USGS, US Department of the Interior.
- Philip Stoffer (14 January 2004). "Playas" (.html). Desert Landforms and Surface Processes in the Mojave National Preserve and Vicinity. Open-File Report 2004-1007. USGS, US Department of the Interior.
- Philip Stoffer (14 January 2004). "The Mojave River and Associated Lakes" (.html). Desert Landforms and Surface Processes in the Mojave National Preserve and Vicinity. Open-File Report 2004-1007. USGS, US Department of the Interior.
