= California State Route 189 =

Highway in California

State Route 189
- SR 189 highlighted in red

Route information
- Maintained by Caltrans
- Length: 5.565 mi (8.956 km)

Major junctions
- West end: SR 18 near Crestline
- East end: SR 173 in Lake Arrowhead

Location
- Country: United States
- State: California
- Counties: San Bernardino

Highway system
- State highways in California; Interstate; US; State; Scenic; History; Pre‑1964; Unconstructed; Deleted; Freeways
← SR 188	→ SR 190

State Route 189 (SR 189) is a state highway in the U.S. state of California that runs through the San Bernardino Mountains in San Bernardino County. The route travels from State Route 18 near Crestline to State Route 173 in Lake Arrowhead, serving Twin Peaks and Blue Jay along its way.

== Route description ==
Route 189 is defined in section 489 of the California Streets and Highways Code, and that the highway is "from Route 18 near Strawberry Peak to Route 173 near Lake Arrowhead via Strawberry Flat".

SR 189 begins at Lake Gregory Drive approximately twenty feet north of State Route 18, between the community of Arrowhead Highlands to the west and the community of Rimforest to the east. It wends its way northeastward to the community of Twin Peaks. It continues roughly eastward through Twin Peaks to the community of Agua Fria (Spanish, cold water), where it forms a tee with the northern terminus of Daley Canyon Road. It turns northeast and continues from there through the downtown section of the community of Blue Jay. It ends at State Route 173 in the Village area of the community of Lake Arrowhead.

SR 189 is not part of the National Highway System, a network of highways that are considered essential to the country's economy, defense, and mobility by the Federal Highway Administration.

== History ==
In 1933, a road from Strawberry Peak to the road between Cajon Pass and Lake Arrowhead was added to the state highway system. It was given the number of Route 189 in 1935. The route was unchanged by the 1964 state highway renumbering.

== Major intersections ==
Except where prefixed with a letter, postmiles were measured on the road as it was in 1964, based on the alignment that existed at the time, and do not necessarily reflect current mileage. Postmile prefixes include: R reflecting a realignment in the route since then, M indicating a second realignment, L referring to an overlap due to a correction or change, and T indicating postmiles classified as temporary. Segments that remain unconstructed or have been relinquished to local control may be omitted. The entire route is in San Bernardino County.

Location	Postmile	Destinations	Notes
	0.00	SR 18 / Lake Gregory Drive – San Bernardino, Lake Gregory	West end of SR 189
	3.09	Daley Canyon Road – Big Bear City	
Lake Arrowhead	5.57	SR 173	East end of SR 189
1.000 mi = 1.609 km; 1.000 km = 0.621 mi
