= California State Route 173 =

Highway in California

State Route 173
- SR 173 highlighted in red

Route information
- Maintained by Caltrans
- Length: 24.944 mi (40.143 km)
- Restrictions: The one-lane, unpaved segment between the Pacific Crest Trail and a point northeast of Lake Arrowhead is closed indefinitely

Major junctions
- West end: SR 138 in Hesperia
- East end: SR 18 near Lake Arrowhead

Location
- Country: United States
- State: California
- Counties: San Bernardino

Highway system
- State highways in California; Interstate; US; State; Scenic; History; Pre‑1964; Unconstructed; Deleted; Freeways
← SR 172	→ SR 174

State Route 173 (SR 173) is a state highway in the U.S. state of California that runs entirely in San Bernardino County, mostly in the San Bernardino National Forest. Its west end is at State Route 138 near the west end of Silverwood Lake in the Summit Valley south of Hesperia. Its east end is at State Route 18 south of Lake Arrowhead. The route starts at the Mojave River Forks, skims the easterly and southerly sides of Lake Arrowhead and meets State Route 189, Lake's Edge Road, at the south entrance to the Lake Arrowhead Village.

It is the only California state highway with an unpaved segment, which is a one-lane jeep trail on the northwestern face of the San Bernardino Mountains directly east of Summit Valley and northwest of Blue Jay. Since March 2011, this one-lane unpaved segment of SR 173 has been closed. Through traffic should use SR 138 and SR 18. An alternate route from Hesperia to Lake Arrowhead would involve heading south on I-15, then south on I-215, then east on SR 210 in San Bernardino to reach the southern terminus of SR 18 at Waterman Road.

== Route description ==
Route 173 is defined in section 473 of the California Streets and Highways Code, and that the highway is "from Route 138 to Route 18 via Lake Arrowhead".

SR 173 begins at SR 138 just inside the Hesperia city limits and travels east near the shore of Silverwood Lake, passing near Cedar Springs Dam, several houses and ranches, and the historic Las Flores Ranch site. The road briefly turns north further into the Hesperia city limits, leaving the San Bernardino National Forest. SR 173 leaves the city and enters Mojave River Forks Regional Park, where it turns east and intersects Arrowhead Lake Road, which leads to the urban center of Hesperia. Once SR 173 intersects the Pacific Crest National Scenic Trail, it turns into a one-lane dirt road rising along the north face of the San Bernardino Mountains, first heading east to its apex before turning south to the Lake Arrowhead area. This one-lane dirt segment has been closed to traffic since March 2011. The paved segment of SR 173 resumes northeast of Lake Arrowhead and enters the community of Cedar Glen, where it parallels the Lake Arrowhead shoreline and encounters Papoose Lake. The highway enters the community of Lake Arrowhead, where SR 173 intersects SR 189 and turns south to terminate at SR 18.

SR 173 is not part of the National Highway System, a network of highways that are considered essential to the country's economy, defense, and mobility by the Federal Highway Administration. SR 173 is eligible for inclusion in the State Scenic Highway System, but it is not officially designated as a scenic highway by the California Department of Transportation.

== History ==
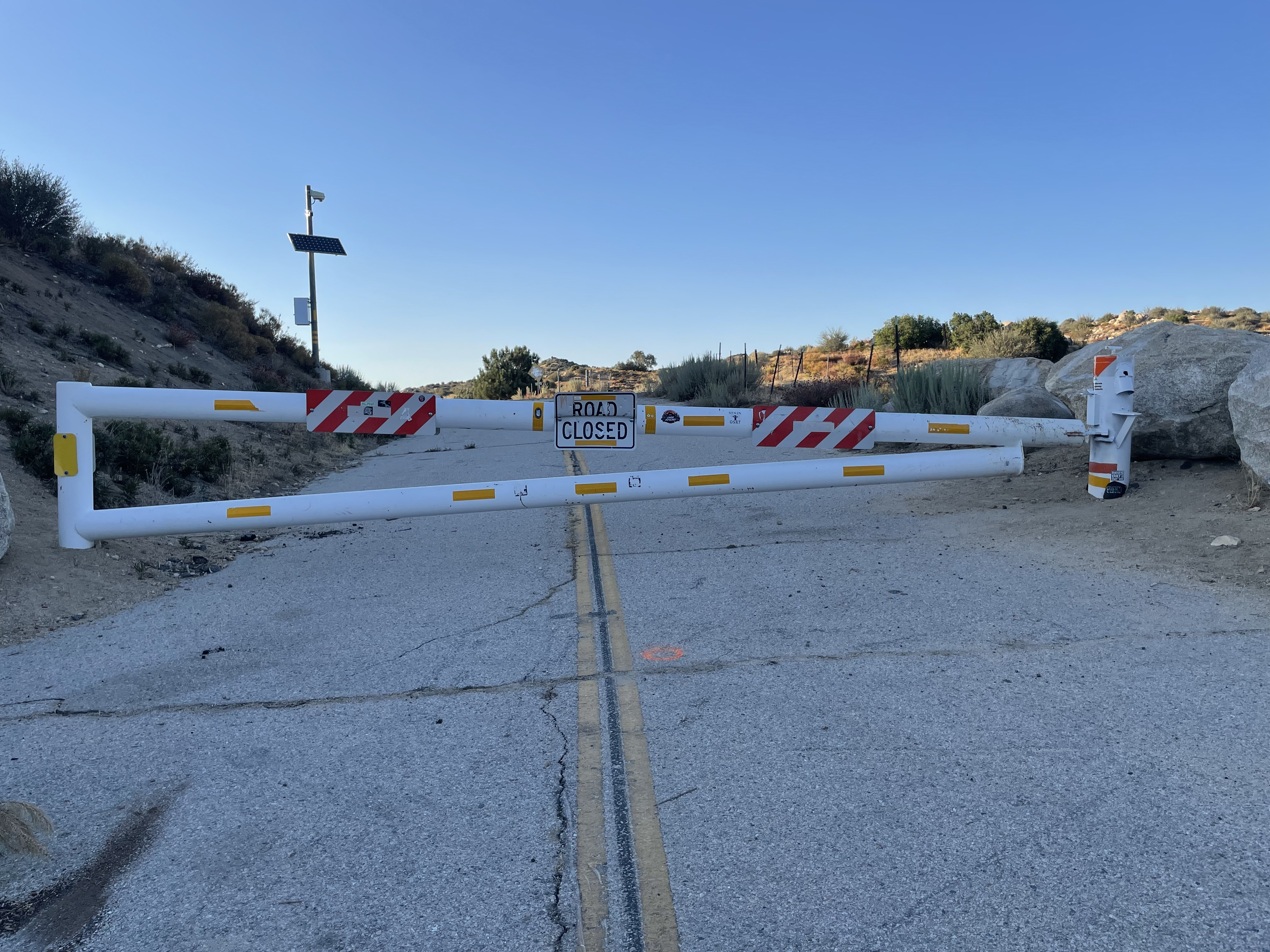
The barrier at the eastern end of the closed unpaved segment of SR 173

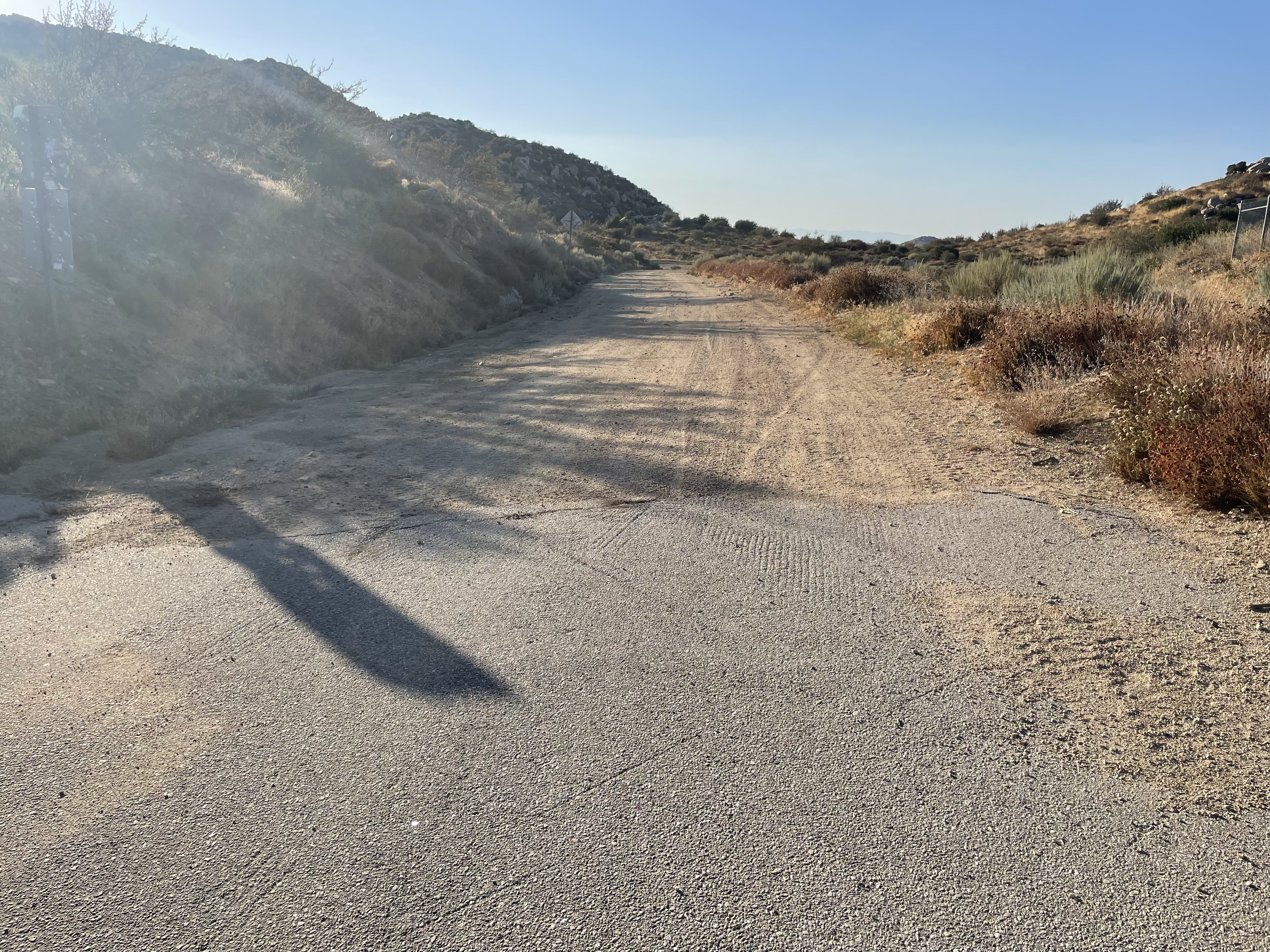
The eastern point along SR 173 where the pavement ends and the unpaved segment heads west

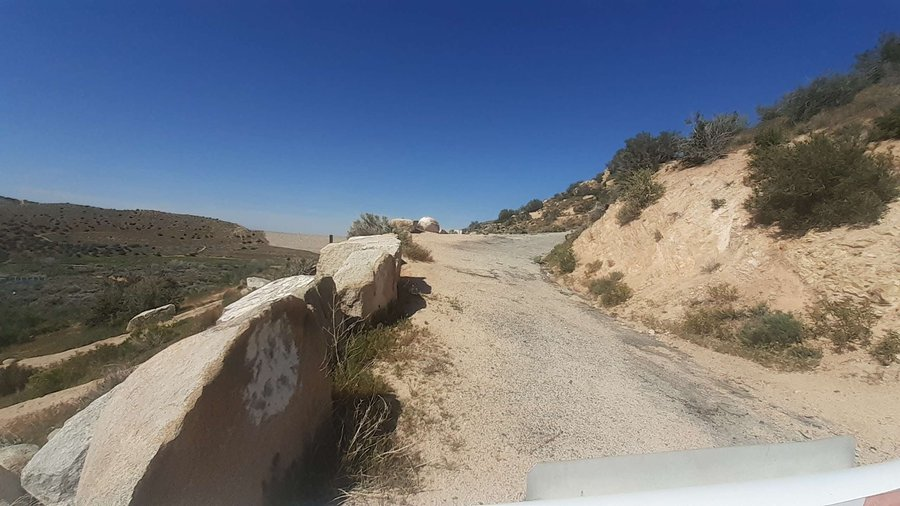
The western barrier along SR 173 where the closed unpaved segment begins and heads east

Before 1964, Route 173 was part of California Legislative Route 59; however, like a small number of other California State highways, it was not signed. From 1934 to the mid-1950s the part of Route 59 that is now Route 173 was designated by the California Division of Highways to be a segment of California sign route 2; however, signing did not occur. From the mid-1950s through July 1964, the Division of Highways changed the routing of future sign route 2 from the subject segment of Route 59 to Legislative Route 188, the segment of present California 138 between the junction of Routes 138 and 173 and Mount Anderson Junction, the junction of Routes 18 and 138 south of Crestline.

The highway has faced repeated problems since the 2003 Willow Fire that has made the one-lane unpaved trail portion (approximately between Postmile 7.5 and Postmile 11.5) unsafe for passage from erosion and storm damage. Since March 2011, the one-lane trail portion of SR 173 has been permanently closed to through traffic. While roadway preservation maintenance (basic grading, debris clearance) is still done, this decision effectively ends all further interest to upgrade the segment to a 2-lane passable highway through state-funded projects.

== Major intersections ==
Except where prefixed with a letter, postmiles were measured on the road as it was in 1964, based on the alignment that existed at the time, and do not necessarily reflect current mileage. Postmile prefixes include: R reflecting a realignment in the route since then, M indicating a second realignment, L referring to an overlap due to a correction or change, and T indicating postmiles classified as temporary. Segments that remain unconstructed or have been relinquished to local control may be omitted. The entire route is in San Bernardino County.

Location	Postmile	Destinations	Notes
Hesperia	L0.00	SR 138 to I-15 – Silverwood Lake, Crestline	West end of SR 173
	L6.99	Arrowhead Lake Road – Hesperia	
	L7.75– 10.90	One-lane, unpaved segment, closed	
Lake Arrowhead	21.46	SR 189 / Village Road – Blue Jay	Eastern terminus of SR 189
	23.04	SR 18 – Running Springs, Big Bear Lake, San Bernardino	East end of SR 173
1.000 mi = 1.609 km; 1.000 km = 0.621 mi: Closed/former
