= Old Fire =

2003 wildfire in Southern California

- Part of the 2003 California wildfires
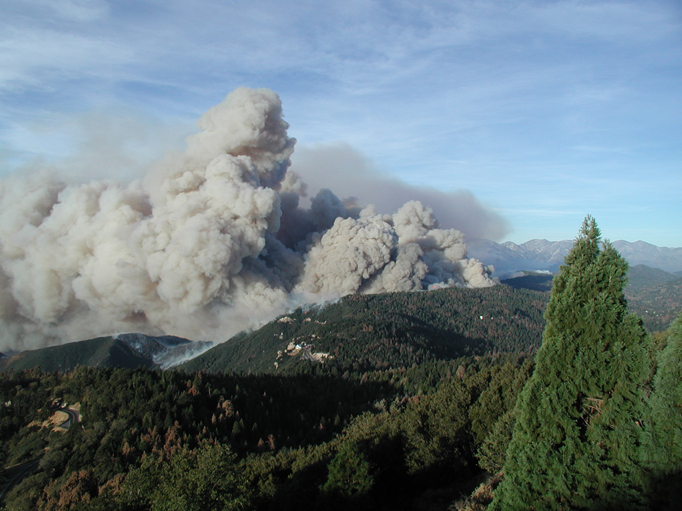
- The Old Fire burning in the San Bernardino Mountains, viewed from Strawberry Peak
- Date: October 25, 2003 –; November 2, 2003; (9 days)
- Location: San Bernardino Mountains, California, U.S.
- Coordinates: 34.20°N 117.28°W

Statistics
- Burned area: 91,281 acres (369 km^{2})

Impacts
- Deaths: 6
- Structures destroyed: 975
- Cost: $1.2 billion (2003 USD)

Ignition
- Cause: Arson
- Perpetrator: Rickie Lee Fowler

Map
- Location within southern California

The Old Fire was a large complex wildfire that started on October 25, 2003, near Old Waterman Canyon Road and California State Route 18 in the San Bernardino Mountains, in San Bernardino County, Southern California, United States. The Old Fire caused at least $1.2 billion in damage.

The Old Fire was one of 15 wildfires throughout Southern California that month, which became known as the "2003 Firestorm" and the "Fire Siege of 2003." This included the huge Cedar Fire, what was then the second-largest fire in California's history after the Santiago Canyon Fire of 1889.

== The wildfire ==
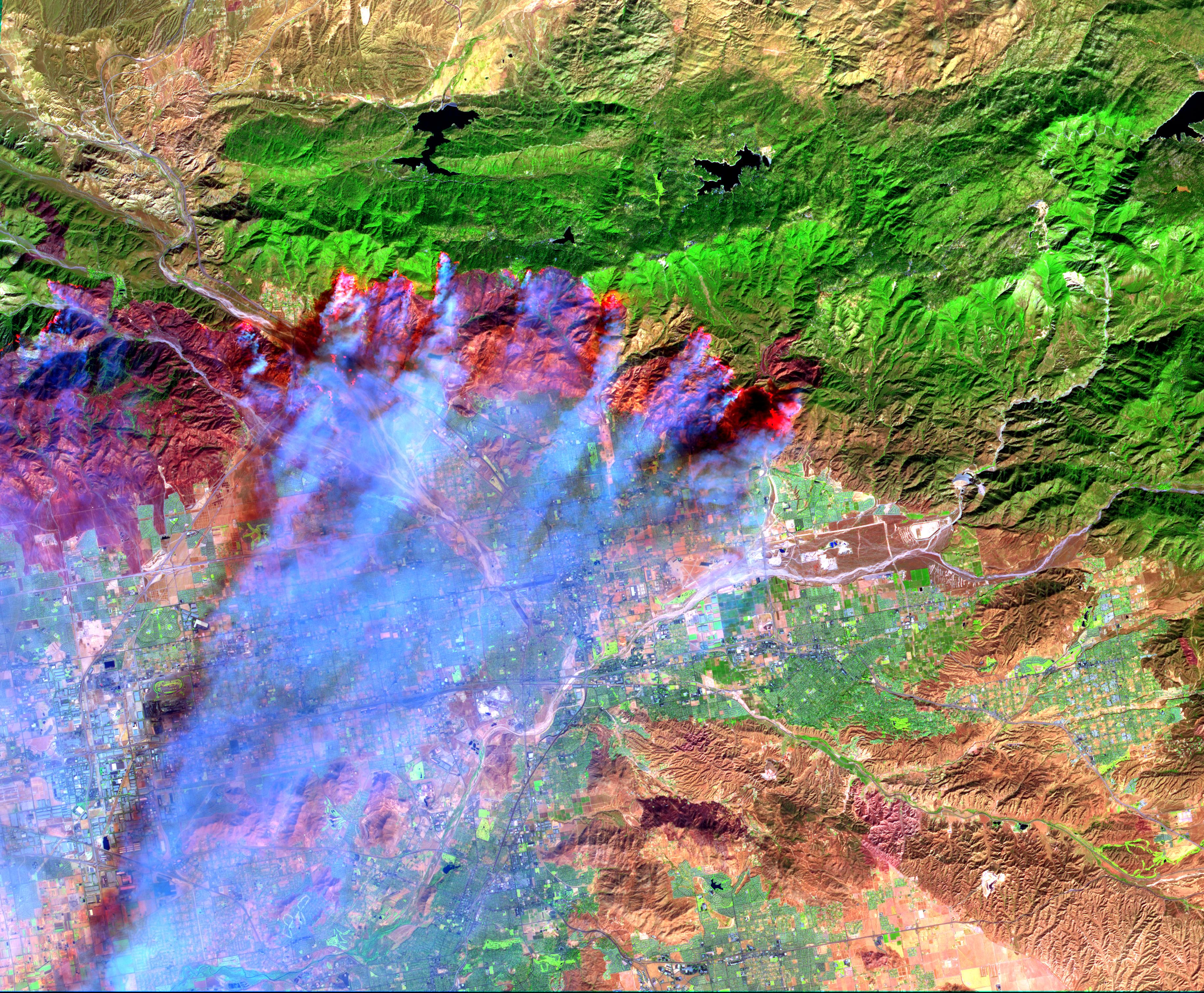
Old Fire: Infrared aerial close-up image

Fanned by the Santa Ana winds, the Old Fire burned 91,281 acres (369.40 km^{2}), destroyed 993 homes, and caused six deaths. The fire threatened San Bernardino and Highland, as well as the mountain resort communities of Cedar Glen, Crestline, Running Springs and Lake Arrowhead and forcing upwards of 80,000 residents to evacuate their homes. Part of California State University, San Bernardino burned during the fire.

The fire was fully contained on November 2, 2003, with the help of rain and snow. The final cost of fighting the fire was $42 million. The Lake Arrowhead community is now part of a Redevelopment Agency, which a Board of Supervisors controls.

=== Old Fire, Padua, and Grand Prix wildfires ===
A United States Forest Service report on the "true" combined costs of the 2003 Old Fire, Padua, and the Grand Prix wildfires (the Grand Prix Fire merged with the Old Fire and the part of the Grand Prix Fire that crossed into Los Angeles County was known as the "Padua Fire") was nearly $1.3 billion. Wildfire impacts are much higher when cleanup, watershed damage, and other costs are considered beyond the expenses for firefighting and property damage. About 750,000 acres (3,000 km^{2}) were blackened across five southern California counties.

== Cause ==
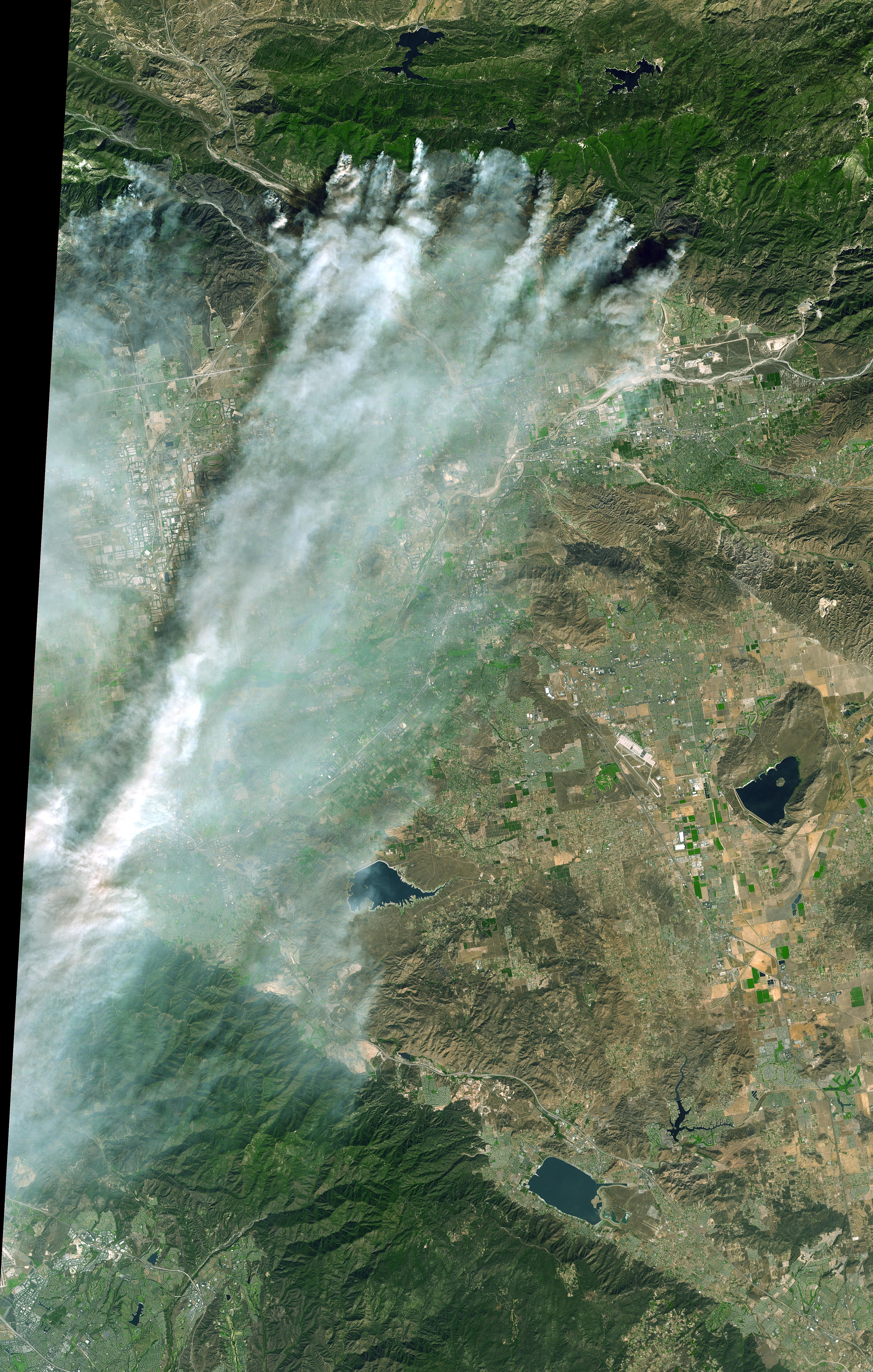
Old Fire and Grand Prix fires: Natural color aerial image

=== Arson ===
In 2009, Rickie Lee Fowler was charged with igniting the Old Fire. Authorities charged that he was a passenger in a white van seen leaving the area where the fire started, and that Fowler was the person seen throwing a lit flare into brush by the side of the road. The driver of the van, Martin David Valdez, Jr., died of a gunshot wound in 2006. A grand jury indicted Fowler on October 19, 2009, with one count of arson of an inhabited structure, one count of aggravated arson, and five counts of murder, based on five residents in the burn evacuation areas who died of heart attacks. Although a sixth man also died of a heart attack after the fire was set, prosecutors could not link that death to the stress of the fire directly. The deaths of an additional fourteen people may be associated with this fire, killed two months later when a mudslide ripped through a camp in Waterman Canyon. A jury would later assign 30% of responsibility for the deaths to Caltrans, citing inadequate engineering of Highway 18.

On January 21, 2010, the San Bernardino County prosecutor announced that he would seek the death penalty. Fowler then recanted his confession, saying that he had admitted to the crime only to appease authorities so that he could be transferred to a prison closer to his mother.

In September 2011, Fowler moved to dismiss the indictment because the prosecutors had failed to present exculpatory evidence to the grand jury. In January 2012, he was reportedly discussing a plea bargain, but no plea bargain was reached and the case went to trial.

The trial started in July 2012 in San Bernardino, having been rescheduled from January. Prosecutors charged with special circumstances which can bring the death penalty. On August 15, 2012, Fowler was convicted of five counts of murder and two counts of arson. On September 28, 2012, the jury returned a verdict of death. The death verdict was affirmed by the trial judge on January 28, 2013.

=== Accidental ignition ===
On August 7, 2007, local newspapers reported that 25-year-old Jeremiah D. Hope of Riverside, faced federal charges for starting a blaze that eventually merged with the Old Fire. Authorities said Hope had been evacuated from his Crestline home when he and some friends off-roaded onto dry vegetation to get a better view of the Old Fire. The vehicle's catalytic converter reportedly sparked a second fire near Playground Road, which firefighters dubbed the Playground Fire. That fire quickly consumed forest land and became part of the Old Fire. Hope faced misdemeanor counts of causing the national forest to burn without a permit and one count of placing a vehicle in a dangerous area.

== Victims ==
The victims identified were Charles Howard Cunningham, 93, of San Bernardino; Ralph Eugene McWilliams, 67, of Cedar Glen; Chad Leo Williams, 70, of Crestline; James William McDermoth, 70, of San Bernardino; and Robert Norman Taylor, 54, of San Bernardino. All five victims died from indirect consequences of the fire due to heart attacks brought on by physical or emotional strain.

== See also ==
- 2003 California wildfires
- List of California wildfires
- Fire ecology
- San Bernardino Mountains-related topics
- Wildfires in California-related topics
- Wildfire suppression
- List of death row inmates in the United States
