= Arthur Gregory =

Arthur Gregory may refer to:

- Arthur Gregory (cricketer) (1861–1929), Australian cricketer
- Arthur Gregory (footballer) (born 2007), English footballer
- Arthur John Maundy Gregory (1877–1941), British theatre producer
- Arthur Tappan Gregory (1886–1961), American lawyer and naturalist
- Arthur Gregory Sr., California citrus grower for whom Lake Gregory was named
