= Rim of the World High School =

High school in Lake Arrowhead, California, US

Location
- 27400 State Highway 18, Lake Arrowhead, California 92352; United States
- 34°13′55″N 117°12′28″W

Information
- Type: Public
- Opened: July 1, 1950
- School district: Rim of the World Unified School District
- Superintendent: Dr. Paul Sevillano Superintendent
- Principal: Hailey Corse
- Teaching staff: 42.17 (FTE)
- Grades: 9–12
- Enrollment: 897 (2023–2024)
- Student to teacher ratio: 21.27
- Colors: Blue and grey
- Nickname: Fighting Scots
- Website: rhs.rimsd.k12.ca.us

Rim of the World High School is a public secondary school located in Lake Arrowhead, California, at the top of the mountain overlooking the San Bernardino Valley. It is part of the Rim of the World Unified School District and is the only comprehensive 9–12 high school in the system.

== The school ==
Rim of the World High School has a student body size that ranges between 800 and 1,000 students. Rim of the World High School is believed to be the first in California (and among only a handful in the nation) which has utilized both solar and wind energy for direct use by the high school. The school teams are "The Fighting Scots." The official mascot is the Scottish Terrier.

The school's Advanced TV-Video class puts out a “TV Show” on their website rimtoday.tv every other week, that shows what's going on around campus and often skits put on by the students.

== Green energy ==
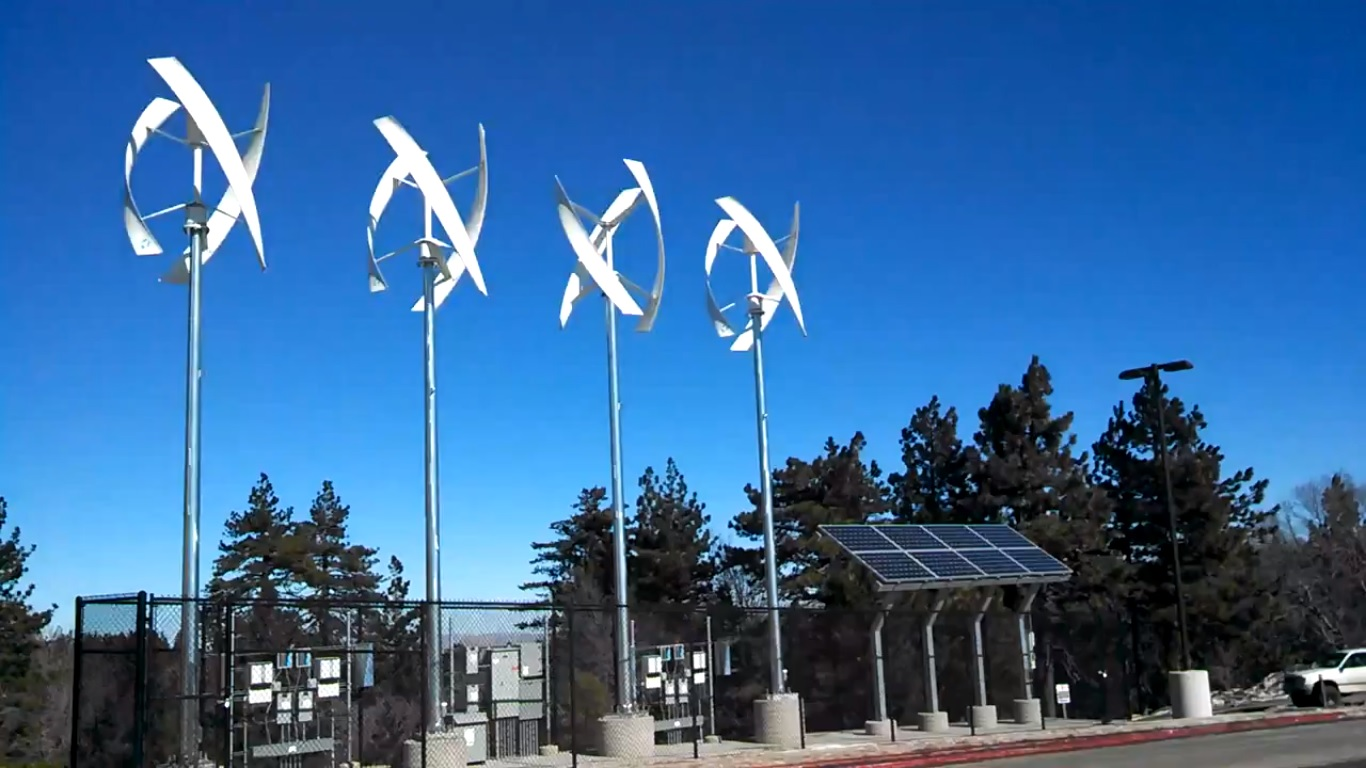
Solar panels and wind turbines power Rim High's science wing

Rim of the World High School utilizes both solar panels and wind turbines to supplement its energy needs.

== Notable alumni ==
- Mike Warnke (Class of 1965), Christian evangelist and Christian comedian
- Tim D. White (Class of 1968), Physical Anthropologist, best known for his work on Lucy (Australopithecus afarensis)
- Pat Hill (Class of 1970), Fresno State football head coach (1997–2011)
- Eddie Elguera (Class of 1979), professional skateboarder
- Jason Hall (Class of 1991), actor and Oscar-nominated screenwriter (for American Sniper, 2014)
- Mike Wahle (Class of 1995), American football guard (1998–2008) and 2005 Pro Bowl selection
- Michelle Kwan (Class of 1998), Olympic figure skater
- Nathan Chen, 2022 Olympic Gold medalist; 2017, 2018, 2019 U.S. champion; 2018, 2019 World champion figure skater
- Kassie Lyn Logsdon (Class of 2005), Playboy Miss May 2010 Playmate
- Michael Griffin (escape artist) (Class of 1979), professional escape artist
