= Cedar Glen, California =

Unincorporated community in California, United States

- Unincorporated community
- Location within the state of California Cedar Glen, California (the United States)
- Coordinates: 34°15′14″N 117°9′54″W
- Country: United States
- State: California
- County: San Bernardino
- Elevation: 5,403 ft (1,647 m)

Population (2000)
  - Total: 552
- Time zone: UTC-8 (Pacific (PST))
  - Summer (DST): UTC-7 (PDT)
- ZIP codes: 92321
- Area code: 909

Cedar Glen is an unincorporated community in San Bernardino County, California, United States. This mountain community lies at an elevation of 5403 ft (1647 m), and is located within the San Bernardino National Forest resort area immediately east of Lake Arrowhead. California State Highway 173 bisects Cedar Glen and passes through Lake Arrowhead.

== History ==
The town's ZIP Code is 92321 and it lies entirely within area code 909. In 2003 Cedar Glen was devastated by the Old Fire with numerous houses and cabins destroyed. In the winter of 2023, Cedar Glen, along with the rest of the San Bernardino mountains, was under a state of emergency due to "Snowmaggedon." In 2023, Cedar Glen made international headlines after Lauri Carleton was shot and killed for hanging a pride flag outside her store.

== Geography ==
=== Climate ===
Cedar Glen has a roughly Mediterranean climate.

Climate data for Lake Arrowhead, CA
Month	Jan	Feb	Mar	Apr	May	Jun	Jul	Aug	Sep	Oct	Nov	Dec	Year
Mean daily maximum °F (°C)	44 (7)	45 (7)	52 (11)	59 (15)	68 (20)	76 (24)	81 (27)	81 (27)	75 (24)	63 (17)	51 (11)	44 (7)	62 (16)
Mean daily minimum °F (°C)	30 (−1)	30 (−1)	32 (0)	36 (2)	42 (6)	49 (9)	57 (14)	57 (14)	51 (11)	42 (6)	35 (2)	30 (−1)	41 (5)
Average precipitation inches (mm)	8.20 (208)	9.54 (242)	6.08 (154)	2.73 (69)	1.00 (25)	0.25 (6.4)	0.10 (2.5)	0.21 (5.3)	0.69 (18)	2.51 (64)	3.41 (87)	5.21 (132)	39.93 (1,013.2)
Source: weather.com

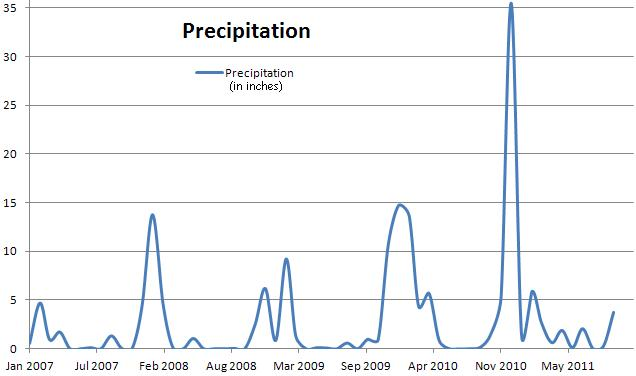
Precipitation at the Cedar Glen Observatory.

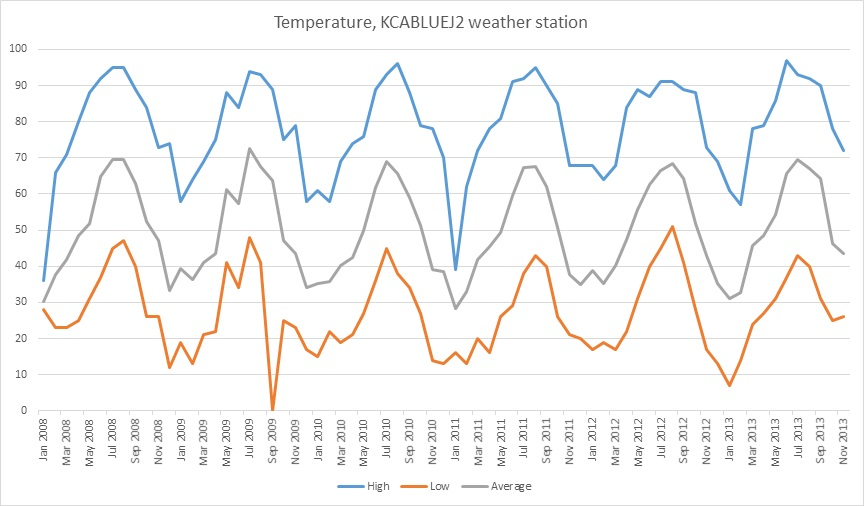
Temperature (high/average/low) at the Cedar Glen Observatory

== Demographics ==
As of the census of 2020, there were 1,310 people and 1,249 housing unit. The racial makeup of the CDP was 67% White, 2% African American, <1% Native American, <1% Asian, <1% Pacific Islander, 15% from other races, and 15% from two or more races. Hispanic or Latino of any race were 25% of the population.

== Government ==
In the California State Legislature, Cedar Glen is in the 23rd senatorial district, represented by Republican Suzette Martinez Valladares, and in the 33rd Assembly district, represented by Republican Alexandra Macedo.

In the United States House of Representatives, Cedar Glen is in California's 8th congressional district, represented by Democrat John Garamendi.

== Education ==
Cedar Glen is served by the Rim of the World Unified School District.
