= Mike Wahle =

American football player (born 1977)

No. 68
- Position: Guard

Personal information
- Born: March 29, 1977 (age 49); Portland, Oregon, U.S.
- Listed height: 6 ft 6 in (1.98 m)
- Listed weight: 304 lb (138 kg)

Career information
- High school: Rim of the World (Lake Arrowhead, California)
- College: Navy (1995–1997)
- Supplemental draft: 1998: 2nd round

Career history
- Green Bay Packers (1998–2004); Carolina Panthers (2005–2007); Seattle Seahawks (2008)

Awards and highlights
- Pro Bowl (2005)

Career NFL statistics
- Games played: 152
- Games started: 138
- Fumble recoveries: 4
- Stats at Pro Football Reference

Michael James Wahle (/ˈwɔːl/; born March 29, 1977) is an American former professional football player who was a guard for 11 seasons in the National Football League (NFL). He played college football for the Navy Midshipmen. He was selected by the Green Bay Packers in the second round of the 1998 NFL Supplemental Draft. A Pro Bowl selection in 2005, Wahle also played for the Carolina Panthers and Seattle Seahawks.

== Early life ==
Wahle attended Rim of the World High School (Lake Arrowhead, California) and won four varsity letters in baseball as a pitcher, and three varsity letters each in football and basketball before graduating in 1995. He played three years at the U. S. Naval Academy before being forced to resign in his senior season after he tested positive for steroids.

== Professional career ==
=== Green Bay Packers ===
Wahle played the first seven seasons of his career with the Green Bay Packers from 1998 to 2004.

=== Carolina Panthers ===
Wahle signed as a free agent with the Carolina Panthers in 2005 and was selected to the Pro Bowl that season. He was released by the Panthers on February 11, 2008.

=== Seattle Seahawks ===
On February 14, 2008, Wahle signed a five-year contract with the Seattle Seahawks. He started 10 games for the Seahawks in 2008 before being placed on injured reserve with a shoulder injury on December 5. The team signed offensive lineman Steve McKinney to take his place on the roster.

Wahle was released after a failed physical on July 31, 2009, and subsequently retired.

== Family ==
Wahle and his wife, Trina, have two children; daughter Teagan and son Maddox. He now resides in San Diego, California.
