= Simi Fire =

2003 wildfire in Southern California

- Part of the 2003 California wildfires
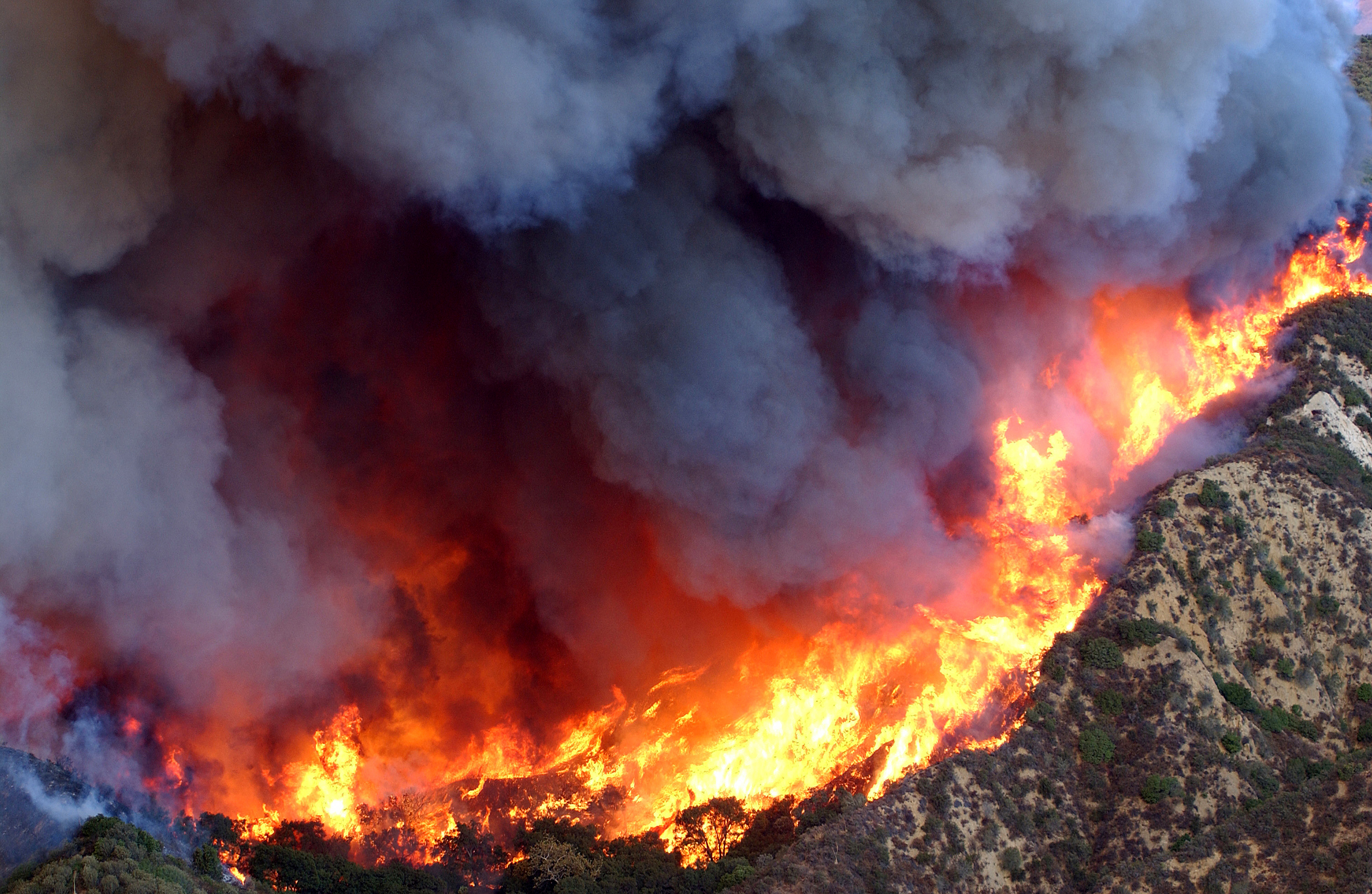
- The Simi Fire burns in Southern California's Simi Hills, viewed from a C-130 air tanker.
- Date: October 25, 2003 –; November 5, 2003; (12 days)
- Location: Los Angeles County & Ventura County, California, United States

Statistics
- Burned area: 108,204 acres (438 km^{2})

Impacts
- Injuries: 21
- Structures lost: 37 residences; 278 outbuildings
- Cost: $10 million (2003 USD)

The Simi Fire was a devastating 2003 wildfire that burned 108,204 acres (438 km^{2}) of land in the Simi Hills and southeastern Simi Valley in eastern Ventura County and western Los Angeles County, in the U.S. state of California. The Simi Fire was one of multiple large, fast-moving, and destructive wildfires in Southern California in October 2003, in a fire siege that included the Cedar, Old, and Grand Prix fires. The Simi Fire resulted in no fatalities but did cause 21 injuries. The cause of the fire remains unknown.

At its peak, the Simi Fire burned up to 10,000 acres (40 km^{2}) an hour. It threatened the major foothill communities of Porter Ranch and Chatsworth after crossing from Ventura County into Los Angeles County. The fire threatened homes near Stevenson Ranch, though it burned none. It also forced the closure of the Golden State Freeway (Interstate 5) for more than 2.5 hours on October 29 as fire crews successfully worked to prevent it from jumping the freeway north of California State Route 14, near Santa Clarita. By the night of October 30, the Simi Fire was 40% contained. That number jumped to 85% by the night of October 31. The fire was declared 100% contained on November 1 when precipitation moved into the area and aided firefighters.

The governor of California Gray Davis declared a state of emergency in Ventura and Los Angeles counties as a result of the Simi Fire and others burning concurrently.

== See also ==
- 2003 California wildfires
