= Rim of the World Unified School District =

School district in California, United States

Address
- 27315 North Bay Road San Bernardino County Blue Jay, California, 92317; United States

District information
- Type: Public
- Grades: K – 12
- NCES District ID: 0632610

Students and staff
- Students: 2,926 (2020–2021)
- Teachers: 131.21 (FTE)
- Staff: 169.35 (FTE)
- Student–teacher ratio: 22.3:1

Other information
- Website: www.rimsd.k12.ca.us

Rim of the World Unified School District is a school district headquartered in Blue Jay, San Bernardino County, California. It consists of three elementary schools, one middle school and one high school.

It includes the census-designated places of Lake Arrowhead and Running Springs, and almost all of the Crestline CDP.

== Schools ==
=== Secondary Schools ===
- Rim of the World High School (Nicknamed "Rim HS")
- Mountain High School

- Mary Putnam Henck Intermediate School

=== Primary schools ===
- Charles Hoffman Elementary School
- Lake Arrowhead Elementary School
- Valley of Enchantment Elementary School
- Lake Gregory Elementary (closed)
- Grandview Elementary (closed)
