= Eddie Elguera =

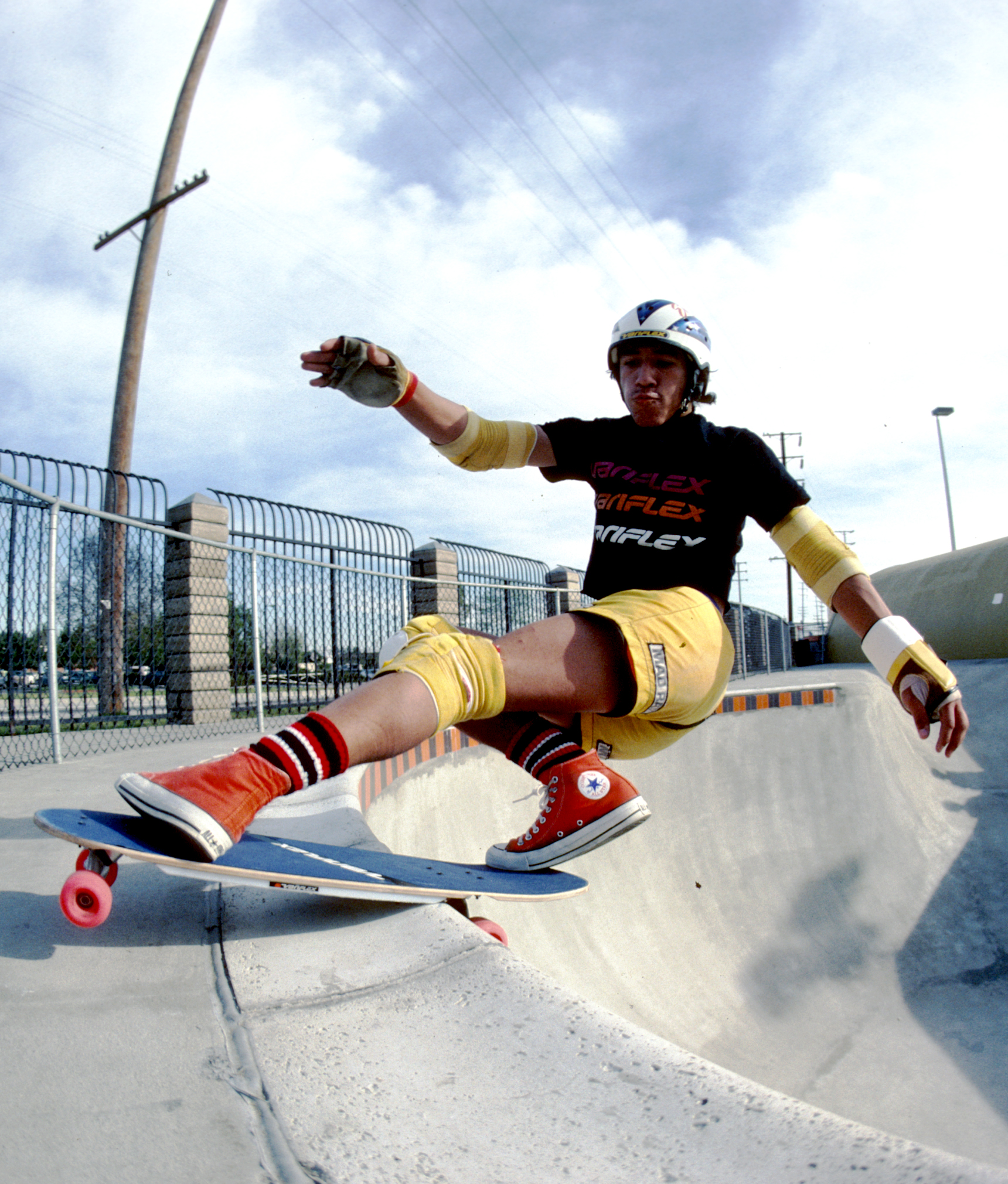
- Born: November 12, 1962 (age 63); Bellflower, California, U.S.
- Other name: Nicknamed El Gato
- Occupations: Pastor, Skateboarder
- Spouse: Dawna Claydon (m. 1984)
- Children: Malachi (b. 1985), Christopher (b. 1987), Isaac (b. 1993)
- Website: Elguera.com

Eddie Elguera (born November 12, 1962, in Bellflower, California) is a 2-time world champion skateboarder and senior pastor of C3 Church, in the Palm Springs area of Southern California. He is also known by the nickname "El Gato". Eddie graduated from Rim of the World High School. He is married to Dawna Elguera and has three sons, Malachi Elguera, Christopher Elguera, and Isaac Elguera. Elguera also has six grandchildren. Elguera and his family currently live in Palm Desert, California.

== Skateboard career ==
Elguera, who was given the nickname "El Gato" (Spanish for "The Cat") early on in his career (in reference to his Mexican American heritage), is recognized as an early innovator of vertical skateboarding.

In May 1979, Elguera received the title of U.S. Amateur Skateboard Association Champion. He then went on to the professional circuit and became Skateboarder of the Year a Skateboard Magazine readers' poll, and received the "Most Spectacular New Maneuver" award.

In 1980, Elguera went on to win the 1980 Gold Cup Series of skateboarding and became the World Champion for the second year in a row. Some of the tricks, which have enabled him to play a part in skateboarding history, include the Elguerial, the frontside rock-n-roll, the fakie ollie, and the frontside invert, which he perfected. Elguera performed in the music video "Freedom of Choice" for the new wave band "Devo". However, Elguera developed a substance abuse problem that he struggled with for several years.

Elguera continues to compete in the Masters Division on World Cup Skateboarding. He was inducted into the Skateboarding Hall of Fame in 2016. Elguera has been described as an innovator and mentor by figures within the skateboarding industry by many in the skateboard industry including Tony Hawk, Steve Caballero, Christian Hosoi and Eric Koston.

== Christianity ==
In 1983, Elguera became a born-again Christian. He joined a church pastored by Jim Cobrae. Within a three-year period of time, Elguera married his wife Dawna, a girl from his church, and they began a family. During this time Elguera decided to return to skateboarding.

Elguera has been skating and telling people the good news about the Lord Jesus Christ, all over the world. “The Lord has blessed me one hundredfold, with a comeback after seven years of having left skating. From success to nothing, and back to success with Jesus, only God could do such a thing”. Elguera has been on Nickelodeon, ESPN, The 700 Club, T.B.N.’s Fire By Night, 100 Huntley Street a Christian program in Canada, and on television programming in various countries around the world. Along with various magazine interviews such as Christianity Today, Breakaway, a Focus on the Family publication, Elguera has skated as part of the Franklin Graham and John Guest Crusades across the U.S. and Youth Alive in Australia.

Elguera has used skateboarding as an approach to ministry and a means to motivate children to get involved in religion. “Through the gift that God has given me, I have the honor of seeing kids come to Christ, as well as many of the parents!”

In recent years, Elguera and his wife Dawna created and hosted the El Gato Classic which began as an event that gathers skateboarders and fans from around the world for a weekend that combines art, music, and skateboarding. Elguera's vision for the event is to "Honor the Past and Champion the future". Since its inception, it has grown to include skateboard contests that feature all generations of skateboarders, including a women's event.

Elguera and Dawna have been Executive Producing and Directing a Docu-Series titled "The Golden Era of Skateboarding". It is the story of the generation of skaters, who respected and raised the bar of the Dogtown era in the 1970s and inspired a new generation of skaters like Tony Hawk and Christian Hosoi throughout the 1980s and 90s. This DocuSeries will profile the first vertical Pro Bowl contest series: skateboarding from the Hester Series #1 in 1978, Hester Series #2 in 1979, and the Gold Cup Series in 1980. It will includearchival footage, interviews, and documentation of the event.
