= Murder of Laura Ann Carleton =

2023 murder of American woman

- Part of 2020s anti-LGBT movement in the United States
- Image of Lauri Carleton
- Location of the incident in California
- Date: August 18, 2023
- Time: 5 p.m. PT
- Location: Cedar Glen, California, U.S.; 34°15′20.32″N 117°10′18.53″W
- Type: Shooting
- Motive: Anti-LGBT sentiment
- Perpetrator: Travis Ikeguchi
- Deaths: 2 (including the perpetrator)

On August 18, 2023, 66-year-old Laura Ann "Lauri" Carleton was murdered in connection with hanging a pride flag outside the Mag.Pi clothing store that she owned, located in Cedar Glen, California, following an altercation with a patron. According to law enforcement, detectives learned the suspected killer, 26-year-old Travis Ikeguchi, made "several disparaging remarks about a rainbow flag that stood outside the store before shooting Carleton." The murder is being investigated as a possible hate crime.

Later that day, Ikeguchi was shot and killed by police after opening fire on them. The murder occurred amid a widespread right-wing anti-LGBT campaign in the United States.

== Victim ==
Lauri Carleton was a 66-year-old businesswoman in Cedar Glen. She studied fashion at the ArtCenter College of Design a private art university in Pasadena, California, and worked 15 years as an executive at Kenneth Cole. She was the mother of nine children. Although not a member of the community herself, Carleton was an LGBTQ+ ally. According to a friend, Carleton experienced prior harassment due to her pride flags and once stated, "I'm scared that I'm going to get into an altercation some day."

== Perpetrator ==
The killer was Travis Ikeguchi, a 26-year-old man from Cedar Glen. He regularly posted anti-LGBTQ and anti-abortion messages on Twitter and Gab. In one post, Ikeguchi wrote "What to do with the flag?" alongside an image of burning the rainbow flag. According to media reports, Ikeguchi also posted statements including, "We need to STOP COMPROMISING on this LGBT dictatorship [...] True followers of Christ SHOULD NOT and NEVER TOLERATE this stupid indoctrination of LGBT agenda in marriage or in our own businesses." He frequently retweeted Bible verses, Christian nationalist content, and anti-Semitic materials. He was critical of former President Donald Trump and instead supported Tom Hoefling, a far-right Constitution Party and American Independent Party candidate for president. Ikeguchi was a supporter of anti-trans blogger Matt Walsh, having retweeted and reposted his content on many occasions.

== Murder ==
According to the San Bernardino Sheriff's Department, Ikeguchi made disparaging remarks about the pride flag hanging outside Carleton's store. Following a confrontation in which he used homophobic slurs, Ikeguchi shot Carleton. When police arrived, Carleton was found suffering from a gunshot wound and later pronounced dead at the scene. The shooting was filmed by the store's closed-circuit cameras.

Authorities then received notice that Ikeguchi had been seen nearby. After locating Ikeguchi, who was armed with a handgun, a confrontation with police occurred in which Ikeguchi opened fire on officers, striking several squad cars. Police returned fire, killing Ikeguchi, who was pronounced dead on the scene.

== Reactions ==
=== Public figures ===
Director Paul Feig was a friend of Carleton's. In a tweet, he connected Carleton's death to a large wave of anti-LGBT backlash, writing, "What happened to her is an absolute tragedy. If people don't think anti-gay & trans rhetoric isn't dangerous, think again." On Instagram, actress Bridget Everett wrote, "All that anti-LGBTQ rhetoric has a price. And now, Lauri's husband Bort, her daughters, friends and community are devastated. And for what?"

Actress Jamie Lee Curtis wrote, "I feel deeply saddened by this. This is our country now and we can't look away. Rest in peace Laura Ann Carleton, a mother of nine." UNHCR Goodwill Ambassador Kristin Davis stated, "I cannot comprehend what has happened and I can only imagine what her family and close friends are going through. We cannot rest in our work towards love and understanding and equality for every person. It is abundantly clear that divisive senseless hate is the only motive for this hate crime."

=== Organizations ===
The president of the LGBT-rights organization GLAAD stated, "The tragic, targeted killing of Lauri over the Pride flag displayed at her Lake Arrowhead store was senseless and, unfortunately, part of a growing number of attacks on LGBTQ people and our allies."

=== Politicians ===
In a statement, San Bernardino County Supervisor Dawn Rowe wrote, "This senseless act of hate and violence is unthinkable and I stand with my mountain communities as we mourn this incredible loss. Everyone deserves to live free of hate and discrimination and practice their constitutional right of freedom of speech. Lauri was a remarkable member of the community and I send my deepest condolences to her family in this time of grief." California Governor Gavin Newsom wrote, "This is absolutely horrific. A shop owner has been shot and killed by a man after he criticized the pride flag hanging outside her business. Lauri leaves behind her husband and 9 children. This disgusting hate has no place in CA."

In response to the shooting California State Senator Scott Wiener wrote, "The threat to our community is real. And it flows directly from the violent rhetoric being directed at us." House Representative Cori Bush wrote, "This is the danger of the onslaught of homophobia & transphobia we're seeing across the country. We won’t forget Lauri or her commitment to LGBTQIA+ rights."

=== Family ===
In a phone interview, Carleton's daughter told The New York Times, "I just want the world to remember her for who she was. And that she passed away in a place that she cherished, doing what she loved and defending something that was so important to her."
