= Crest Park, California =

Unincorporated community in California, United States

- Unincorporated community
- Location within California Location within the United States
- Coordinates: 34°14′02″N 117°11′47″W
- Country: United States
- State: California
- County: San Bernardino
- Elevation: 5,630 ft (1,720 m)
- Time zone: UTC-8 (Pacific (PST))
  - Summer (DST): UTC-7 (PDT)
- ZIP code: 92326
- Area code: 909
- GNIS feature ID: 1660521

Crest Park is an unincorporated community in San Bernardino County, California, United States. Crest Park is located in the San Bernardino Mountains on California State Route 18 1 mile (1.6 km) south of Lake Arrowhead. Crest Park had a post office with ZIP code 92326, which opened in 1949.
