= 2003 California wildfires =

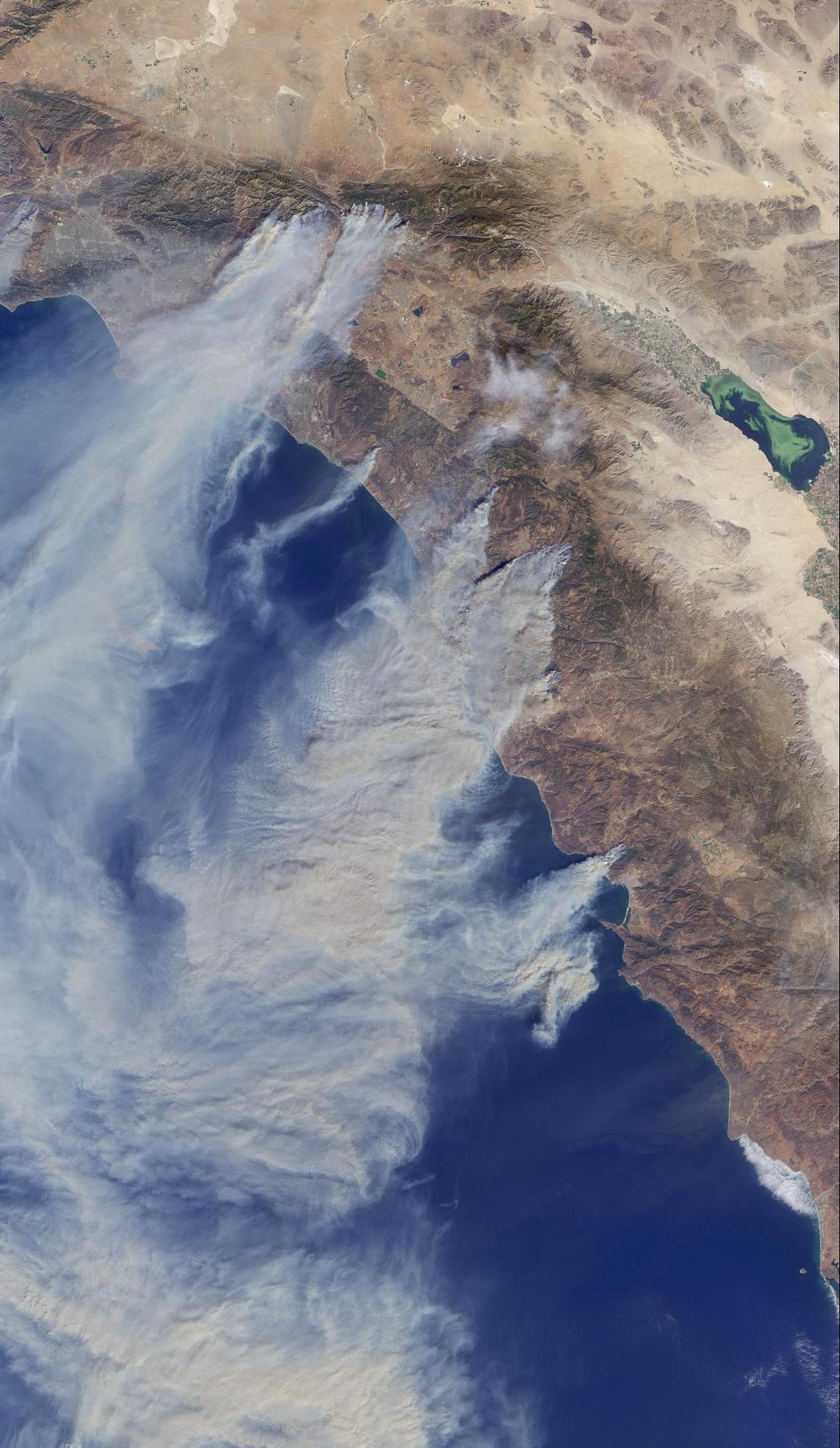
- Satellite view of the October 2003 wildfires in Southern California, depicting the smoke blowing out over the Pacific Ocean.

Statistics
- Total fires: 9,116
- Total area: 1,020,460 acres (4,129.7 km^{2})

Impacts
- Deaths: 24 civilians 1 firefighter
- Injuries: At least 1 firefighter, 36 civilians
- Cost: >$2.729 billion (2003 USD)

During 2003, 9,116 wildfires burned 1,020,460 acres (4,129.7 km^{2}) across the US state of California. In October, a major wildfire outbreak in Southern California burned more than 750,000 acres, destroyed thousands of homes, and killed two dozen people. Many of the victims were killed in their cars while trying to flee.

== Background ==
The timing of "fire season" in California is variable, depending on the amount of prior winter and spring precipitation, the frequency and severity of weather such as heat waves and wind events, and moisture content in vegetation. Northern California typically sees wildfire activity between late spring and early fall, peaking in the summer with hotter and drier conditions. Occasional cold frontal passages can bring wind and lightning. The timing of fire season in Southern California is similar, peaking between late spring and fall. The severity and duration of peak activity in either part of the state is modulated in part by weather events: downslope/offshore wind events can lead to critical fire weather, while onshore flow and Pacific weather systems can bring conditions that hamper wildfire growth.

== List of wildfires ==
Below is a list of fires that exceeded 1,000 acres (4.0 km^{2}) during the 2003 fire season. The list is taken from CAL FIRE's list of large fires.

Name	County	Acres	Km^{2}	Start date	Contained Date (Note: Containment means that fire crews have established and secured control lines around the fire's perimeter. These lines are artificial barriers, like trenches or cleared vegetation, designed to stop the fire's spread, or natural barriers like rivers. Containment reflects progress in managing the fire but does not necessarily mean the fire is starved of fuel, under control, or put out.)	Notes
Local	Riverside	12,000	48.6	February 23, 2003	February 23, 2003	
Delima	Tulare	3,000	12.1	May 3, 2003	May 3, 2003	
Bird	San Joaquin	6,804	27.5	June 1, 2003	June 1, 2003	
Tejon	Kern	1,155	4.7	June 29, 2003	June 2, 2003	2 structures destroyed
Parkhill	San Luis Obispo	1,200	4.9	July 20, 2003	July 22, 2003	18 structures destroyed
Kibbie Complex	Tuolumne	9,815	39.7	July 20, 2003	October 2, 2003	
Coyote	San Diego	18,705	75.7	July 16, 2003	July 26, 2003	2 structures destroyed
Locust	Riverside	1,898	7.7	August 18, 2003	August 20, 2003	1 structure destroyed
Canoe	Humboldt	24,882	100.7	September 3, 2003	October 15, 2003	2 structures damaged
Pass	Riverside	2,397	9.7	October 21, 2003	October 23, 2003	3 structures destroyed
Grand Prix	San Bernardino	66,894	270.7	October 21, 2003	November 5, 2003	136 structures destroyed
Piru	Ventura	63,991	259.0	October 23, 2003	November 14, 2003	8 structures destroyed
Verdale	Los Angeles	8,650	35.0	October 24, 2003	October 24, 2003	1 structure destroyed
Simi	Ventura	108,204	437.9	October 25, 2003	November 5, 2003	300 structures destroyed, 21 injuries
Cedar	San Diego	273,246	1,105.8	October 25, 2003	December 5, 2003	2,820 structures destroyed, 15 fatalities
Old	San Bernardino	91,281	369.4	October 25, 2003	November 14, 2003	1,003 structures destroyed, 6 fatalities
Otay	San Diego	46,291	187.3	October 26, 2003	October 27, 2003	1 residential structure and 5 outbuildings destroyed, 1 firefighter injured
Mine	San Diego	46,000	186.2	October 26, 2003	October 28, 2003	
Mountain	Riverside	10,000	40.5	October 26, 2003	October 29, 2003	61 structures destroyed
Paradise	San Diego	56,700	229.5	October 26, 2003	November 6, 2003	223 structures destroyed, 2 fatalities
Whitmore	Shasta	1,200	4.9	October 27, 2003	October 30, 2003	
