= Lake Arrowhead Reservoir =

Lake Arrowhead
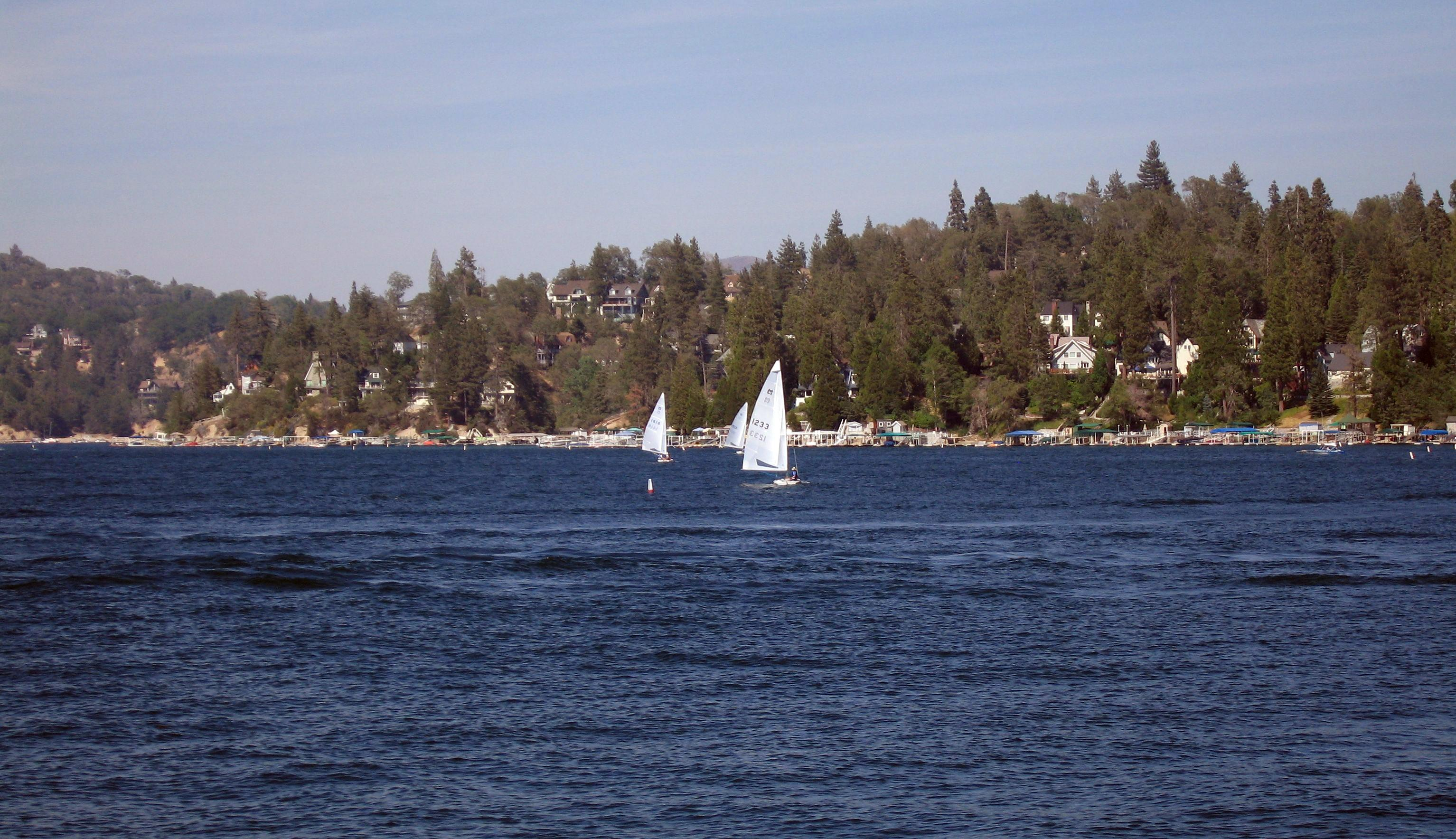

- Location within California Location within the United States
- Location: San Bernardino County, California
- Coordinates: 34°15′30″N 117°10′58″W
- Type: Reservoir
- Basin countries: United States
- Surface area: 780 acres (320 ha)
- Average depth: 100 ft (30 m)
- Max. depth: 185 ft (56 m)
- Water volume: 48,000 acre⋅ft (59,000 dam^{3})
- Surface elevation: 5,125 ft (1,562 m)
- Settlements: Lake Arrowhead
- References: U.S. Geological Survey Geographic Names Information System: Lake Arrowhead Reservoir

Lake Arrowhead is an artificial lake located in the San Bernardino Mountains on Little Bear Creek, a tributary of Deep Creek and the Mojave River. It has a surface area of approximately 780 acres (320 ha) and a capacity of 48,000 acre⋅ft (59,000 dam^{3}). It is surrounded by the unincorporated community of Lake Arrowhead in San Bernardino County, California.

The lake was originally intended to serve as part of a major waterworks project to provide irrigation water to the San Bernardino Valley, and construction of the Lake Arrowhead Dam began toward that end in 1904. However, the original project was halted due to litigation over water supplies to land owners on the desert side of the mountains. Construction of the dam was completed in 1922 by the Arrowhead Lake Company, a Los Angeles syndicate, as part of a plan to develop the area into a resort.

Use of the lake is currently controlled by the Arrowhead Lake Association, which maintains the lake for the recreational use of its members. Only Lake Arrowhead residents with lake rights may access the water. The Lake Arrowhead Community Services District withdraws water from the lake for treatment and distribution to local residents for potable use.

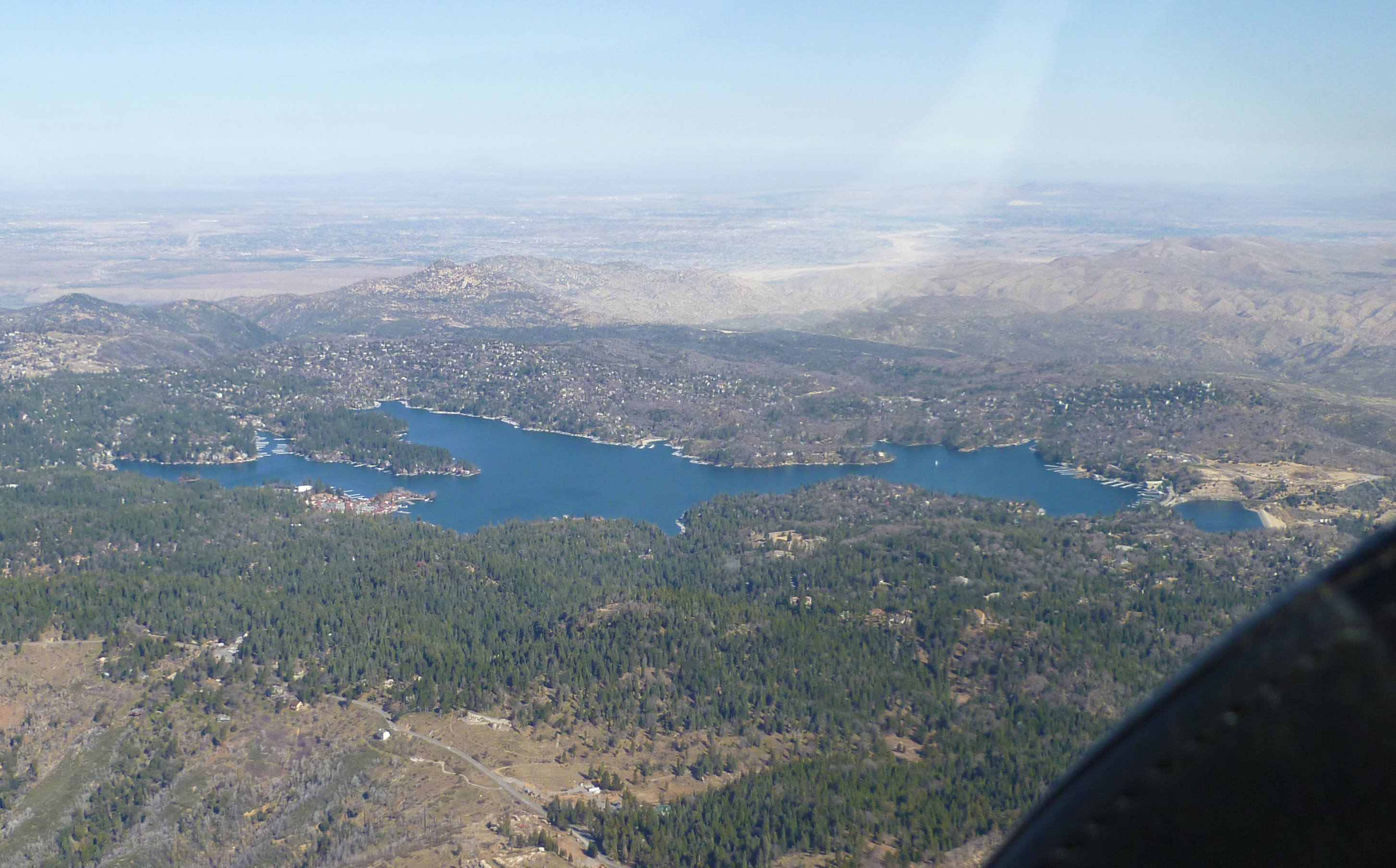
An aerial view of Lake Arrowhead taken from the south.

== See also ==
- List of lakes in California
- List of reservoirs and dams in California
