= Lake Gregory (California) =

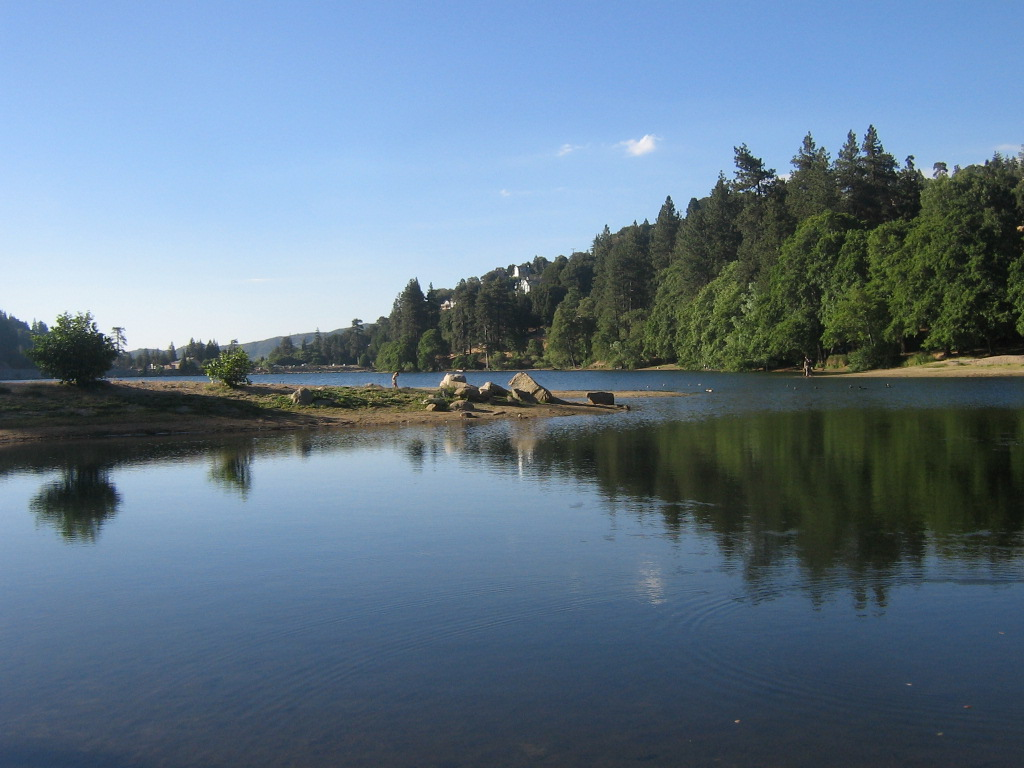

- Location within California Location within the United States
- Location: San Bernardino National Forest; San Bernardino County, California
- Coordinates: 34°14′48″N 117°16′03″W
- Type: Reservoir
- Primary outflows: Houston Creek
- Basin countries: United States
- Max. depth: 80 ft (24 m)
- Surface elevation: 4,554 ft (1,388 m)
- Settlements: Crestline, California
- References: U.S. Geological Survey Geographic Names Information System: Lake Gregory (California)

Lake Gregory is a reservoir in the San Bernardino National Forest of the San Bernardino Mountains in San Bernardino County, California. The lake and the surrounding area make up the Lake Gregory Regional Park adjacent to Crestline, California.

The area, originally known as Houston Flat, was developed by and named for its developer, Redlands citrus grower Arthur Gregory, Sr. Gregory bought and developed land in an area known today as Valley of the Moon. He erected a sawmill at Valley of the Moon to cut wood for crating his "Orange Blossom" brand of citrus fruit. Gregory was also instrumental in creating the Crest Forest County Water District (CFCWD), which, in turn, was necessary to acquire federal aid in order to develop the area. Although the lake is in Crestline proper, Crestline is not a part of the Crest Forest District, but rather the Crestline Water District, which purchases water from CFCWD.

Work began in 1937 under a Works Progress Administration (WPA) grant to dam the east and west forks of Houston Creek, whose waters drained into tributaries of the Mojave River, thereby "going to waste". The project was nearly completed by March 1938, but federal funds had run out. Gregory financed the completion of the project, lending money to the district for the completion. The eventual cost was US$225,000, of which US$160,000 came from the federal government, with the balance funded by the water district.

Heavy rains that March put the dam to its first test. It had been estimated that it would take three years to fill the lake. So heavy were the rains that the lake filled in only three days. An unconfirmed, but plausible urban legend claims that the construction equipment left on the lake bed in 1938 during the rains remains at the bottom of the lake today.

A road built over the dam (present-day Lake Drive) completed the project in January 1939.

Today, the Lake Gregory Recreational Park with swimming and water slides is at the west end of the lake and a walking trail encircles the lake. The south shore of the lake is a popular fishing destination. The regional park is the site of Crestline's Independence Day celebration.

The southeast shore is the site of the private beach and Tyrolean-styled clubhouse of the San Moritz Lodge, once known as Club San Moritz. The original club was built in the Valley of the Moon in 1926 along the shore of now-drained Moon Lake, today the site of Lake Gregory Community Church. A fire of suspicious origin destroyed the building in 1950 and the lake was drained in the early 1960s over increasing problems with mosquitoes. The new club, built along Lake Gregory in 1950, was intended to be a members-only resort and club for property owners in the area. Today, the only remaining buildings are the restaurant, used as the site of special events such as weddings, and a bathhouse, now used as a senior center.

Private vessels and power boats are not allowed on Lake Gregory, although rowboats, paddle boards, pedal-powered "water trikes" and paddle boats are available for rental. The rowboats may be affixed with the renter's own electric trolling motor.

From 2011 to 2013, the park experienced operating losses of $1.4 million. In 2014, the San Bernardino County partnered with The California Parks Company, now named Basecamp Hospitality, after six years of decline due to the flagging economy. In 2018, San Bernardino County put the concessionaire contract up for bid to find a new managing company for Lake Gregory. Basecamp Hospitality won the bid as the only concessionaire applying, but struggled to come to financial terms with the longterm contract and renewed a two-year agreement instead. In 2019, San Bernardino County ended its relationship with Basecamp Hospitality.

The California Office of Environmental Health Hazard Assessment (OEHHA) has developed a safe eating advisory for Lake Gregory based on levels of mercury found in fish caught from this water body.

== See also ==
- List of dams and reservoirs in California
- List of lakes in California
