= Blue Jay, California =

Unincorporated community in California, United States

Blue Jay
- Unincorporated community
- Motto: "The Gateway to Lake Arrowhead"
- Location within the state of California Blue Jay (the United States)
- Coordinates: 34°14′46″N 117°12′32″W
- Country: United States
- State: California
- County: San Bernardino
- Elevation: 5,203 ft (1,586 m)
- Time zone: UTC-8 (Pacific (PST))
  - Summer (DST): UTC-7 (PDT)
- ZIP codes: 92317
- Area code: 909
- GNIS feature ID: 1660347
- Website: Blue Jay, California

Blue Jay is an unincorporated community located in San Bernardino County, California. It is located in the San Bernardino Mountains, above a region of California known as the Inland Empire, and is within the San Bernardino National Forest. Blue Jay Village itself is located 1-mile (1.6 km) from the southwestern bank of Lake Arrowhead.

The town is a part of the Lake Arrowhead Community. Other towns in this community are Lake Arrowhead, Running Springs, Twin Peaks, Sky Forest, Agua Fria, and Cedar Glen.

== History ==
The town started as the homestead of Art (1880-1956) and Norma Wixom (b. Harmon, 1883-1978). They leased a few vacation cabins and opened a store in 1914. Stoney DeMent (1892-1972) leased the land and built a market called The Blue Jay Market in 1934, named after the blue-colored birds that lived in the area, which later became the name of the town built up around it. The naming of the town is something of a misnomer: the local variety of jay is actually the Steller's jay, not the closely related blue jay. While this is widely known in the area, the name has stuck. Residents began to move to Blue Jay about 10 years later. In 1978, Bluejay was purchased by H.R. "Rick" Kaufman through his company Pioneer Take Out Corporation aka Pioneer Chicken.

== Today ==
Blue Jay Village today is home to 2,314 residents. It is considered the entertainment district of the Lake Arrowhead community. It contains a shopping center, a number of restaurants, a bank, the Lake Arrowhead Library, and many privately owned stores. A movie theater, Blue Jay Cinema, operated from 1988 until June 2023. The village also hosts many events including the Lake Arrowhead celebration of film, The Blue Jay Christmas parade, and the Blue Jay Jazz Festival.
