= Crestline, California =

Crestline
- census-designated place
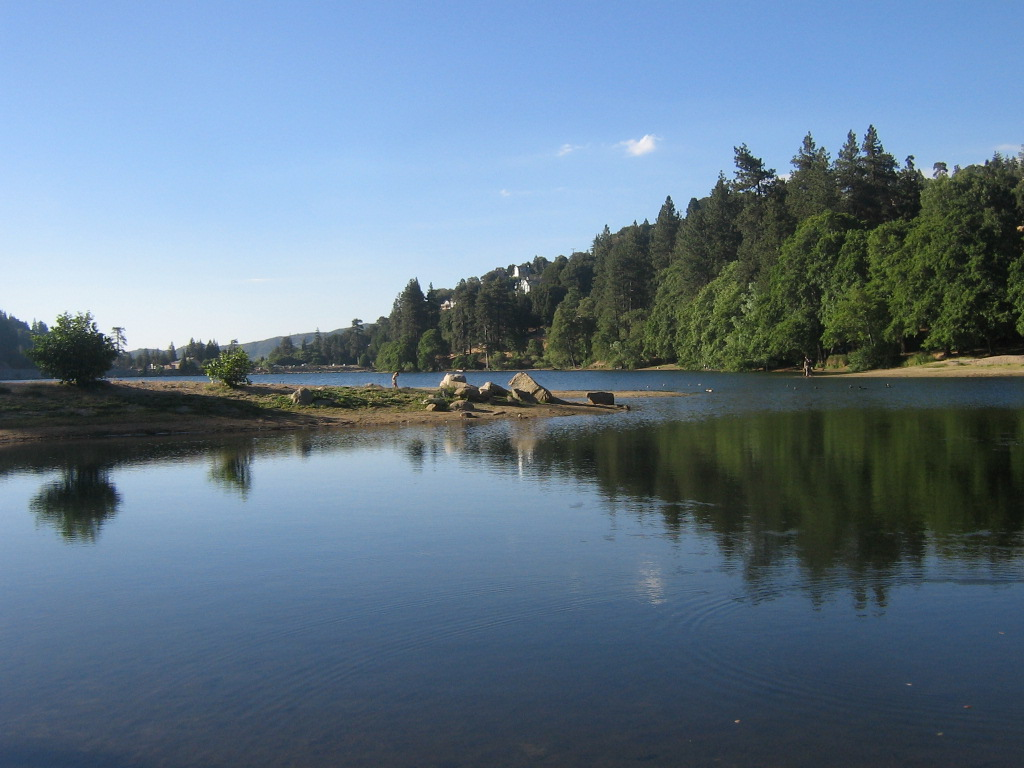
- Lake Gregory in Crestline
- Interactive map of Crestline
- Location in the United States
- Coordinates: 34°14′31″N 117°17′08″W
- Country: United States
- State: California
- County: San Bernardino

Area
  - Total: 14.02 sq mi (36.32 km^{2})
  - Land: 13.90 sq mi (36.01 km^{2})
  - Water: 0.12 sq mi (0.31 km^{2}) 0.85%
- Elevation: 4,613 ft (1,406 m)

Population (2020)
  - Total: 11,650
  - Density: 838/sq mi (323.5/km^{2})
- Time zone: UTC-8 (PST)
  - Summer (DST): UTC-7 (PDT)
- ZIP code: 92325
- Area code: 909
- FIPS code: 06-17162
- GNIS feature ID: 1660523

Crestline is a census-designated place in the San Bernardino Mountains of San Bernardino County, California, United States. The population was 11,650 at the 2020 census, up from 10,770 at the 2010 census.

== Geography ==
According to the United States Census Bureau, Crestline has a total area of 14.0 square miles (36 km^{2}). 13.9 square miles (36 km^{2}) of it is land and 0.1 square miles (0.26 km^{2}) of it (0.85%) is water.

Crestline is located within the San Bernardino National Forest; Lake Gregory is located in the center of Crestline.

=== Neighborhoods ===
The greater community of Crestline includes the neighborhoods known as Valley of Enchantment, Cedarpines Park, and Twin Peaks.

=== Climate ===
According to the Köppen Climate Classification system, Crestline has a warm-summer Mediterranean climate, abbreviated Csb on climate maps.

Climate data for Crestline, California
Month	Jan	Feb	Mar	Apr	May	Jun	Jul	Aug	Sep	Oct	Nov	Dec	Year
Mean daily maximum °F (°C)	45 (7)	47 (8)	51 (11)	56 (13)	64 (18)	74 (23)	81 (27)	80 (27)	76 (24)	64 (18)	55 (13)	47 (8)	62 (17)
Mean daily minimum °F (°C)	28 (−2)	29 (−2)	32 (0)	34 (1)	40 (4)	47 (8)	53 (12)	52 (11)	49 (9)	42 (6)	35 (2)	29 (−2)	40 (4)
Average precipitation inches (mm)	6.5 (170)	7.6 (190)	6.1 (150)	3.8 (97)	1.4 (36)	0.2 (5.1)	0 (0)	0.2 (5.1)	0.8 (20)	2 (51)	3 (76)	5.9 (150)	37.5 (950)
Source: Weatherbase

== Demographics ==
Historical population
Census	Pop.	Note	%±
1970	3,509		—
1980	6,715		91.4%
1990	8,594		28.0%
2000	10,218		18.9%
2010	10,770		5.4%
2020	11,650		8.2%
U.S. Decennial Census; 1850–1870 1880-1890; 1900 1910 1920; 1930 1940 1950; 1960 1970 1980; 1990 2000 2010

Crestline was first listed as an unincorporated place under the name Crest Forest in the 1970 U.S. census. and then as a census designated place under the name Crestline in the 1980 U.S. census.

=== 2020 census ===
As of the 2020 census, Crestline had a population of 11,650 and a population density of 837.9 inhabitants per square mile (323.5/km^{2}).

Racial composition as of the 2020 census
Race	Number	Percent
White	8,657	74.3%
Black or African American	163	1.4%
American Indian and Alaska Native	149	1.3%
Asian	185	1.6%
Native Hawaiian and Other Pacific Islander	15	0.1%
Some other race	991	8.5%
Two or more races	1,490	12.8%
Hispanic or Latino (of any race)	2,823	24.2%

The age distribution was 18.4% under the age of 18, 7.0% aged 18 to 24, 24.3% aged 25 to 44, 29.6% aged 45 to 64, and 20.7% who were 65 years of age or older. The median age was 45.2 years. For every 100 females, there were 102.3 males, and for every 100 females age 18 and over there were 102.1 males.

The census reported that 99.7% of the population lived in households, 0.3% lived in non-institutionalized group quarters, and no one was institutionalized. 89.0% of residents lived in urban areas, while 11.0% lived in rural areas.

There were 4,962 households, of which 22.4% had children under the age of 18. 43.0% were married-couple households, 7.2% were cohabiting couple households, 25.7% had a female householder with no spouse or partner present, and 24.0% had a male householder with no spouse or partner present. About 30.5% of households were one person, and 12.7% had someone living alone who was 65 years of age or older. The average household size was 2.34, and there were 3,040 families (61.3% of all households).

There were 7,306 housing units at an average density of 525.5 units per square mile (202.9 units/km^{2}), of which 4,962 (67.9%) were occupied and 2,344 (32.1%) were vacant. Of the occupied units, 73.8% were owner-occupied and 26.2% were occupied by renters. The homeowner vacancy rate was 3.3% and the rental vacancy rate was 9.4%.

=== Income and poverty ===
In 2023, the US Census Bureau estimated that the median household income was $79,378, and the per capita income was $37,029. About 10.4% of families and 12.7% of the population were below the poverty line.

=== 2010 census ===
At the 2010 census Crestline had a population of 10,770. The population density was 770.4 inhabitants per square mile (297.5/km^{2}). The racial makeup of Crestline was 9,289 (86.2%) White (77.0% Non-Hispanic White), 107 (1.0%) African American, 135 (1.3%) Native American, 96 (0.9%) Asian, 20 (0.2%) Pacific Islander, 526 (4.9%) from other races, and 597 (5.5%) from two or more races. Hispanic or Latino of any race were 1,775 persons (16.5%).

The census reported that 10,723 people (99.6% of the population) lived in households, 39 (0.4%) lived in non-institutionalized group quarters, and 8 (0.1%) were institutionalized.

There were 4,360 households, 1,286 (29.5%) had children under the age of 18 living in them, 2,108 (48.3%) were opposite-sex married couples living together, 451 (10.3%) had a female householder with no husband present, 247 (5.7%) had a male householder with no wife present. There were 309 (7.1%) unmarried opposite-sex partnerships, and 57 (1.3%) same-sex married couples or partnerships. 1,190 households (27.3%) were one person and 362 (8.3%) had someone living alone who was 65 or older. The average household size was 2.46. There were 2,806 families (64.4% of households); the average family size was 2.97.

The age distribution was 2,375 people (22.1%) under the age of 18, 875 people (8.1%) aged 18 to 24, 2,383 people (22.1%) aged 25 to 44, 3,838 people (35.6%) aged 45 to 64, and 1,299 people (12.1%) who were 65 or older. The median age was 43.3 years. For every 100 females, there were 103.2 males. For every 100 females age 18 and over, there were 103.5 males.

There were 7,333 housing units at an average density of 524.6 per square mile, of the occupied units 3,123 (71.6%) were owner-occupied and 1,237 (28.4%) were rented. The homeowner vacancy rate was 6.7%; the rental vacancy rate was 13.8%. 7,463 people (69.3% of the population) lived in owner-occupied housing units and 3,260 people (30.3%) lived in rental housing units.

According to the 2010 United States Census, Crestline had a median household income of $50,079, with 16.8% of the population living below the federal poverty line.

== Government ==
In the California State Legislature, Crestline is in the 19th senatorial district, represented by Republican Rosilicie Ochoa Bogh, and in the 34th Assembly district, represented by Republican Tom Lackey.

In the United States House of Representatives, Crestline is in California's 23rd congressional district, represented by Republican Jay Obernolte.

== Education ==
Almost all of the CDP is served by the Rim of the World Unified School District. It includes three (K-5) elementary schools (Valley of Enchantment, Charles Hoffman, Lake Arrowhead), one (6-8) intermediate school (Mary Putnam Henck), and two high schools (Mountain, Rim Of The World Senior).

A small portion of the CDP extends into Hesperia Unified School District.

== Media ==
The 2014 film Creep was shot in and takes place in a remote cabin in Crestline, and the end features Lake Gregory.

== Notable people ==
- Judy Shapiro-Ikenberry (born 1942), long-distance runner
- Reggie Bannister (born 1945) folk musician, actor
