= Lake Arrowhead, California =

- Census-designated place
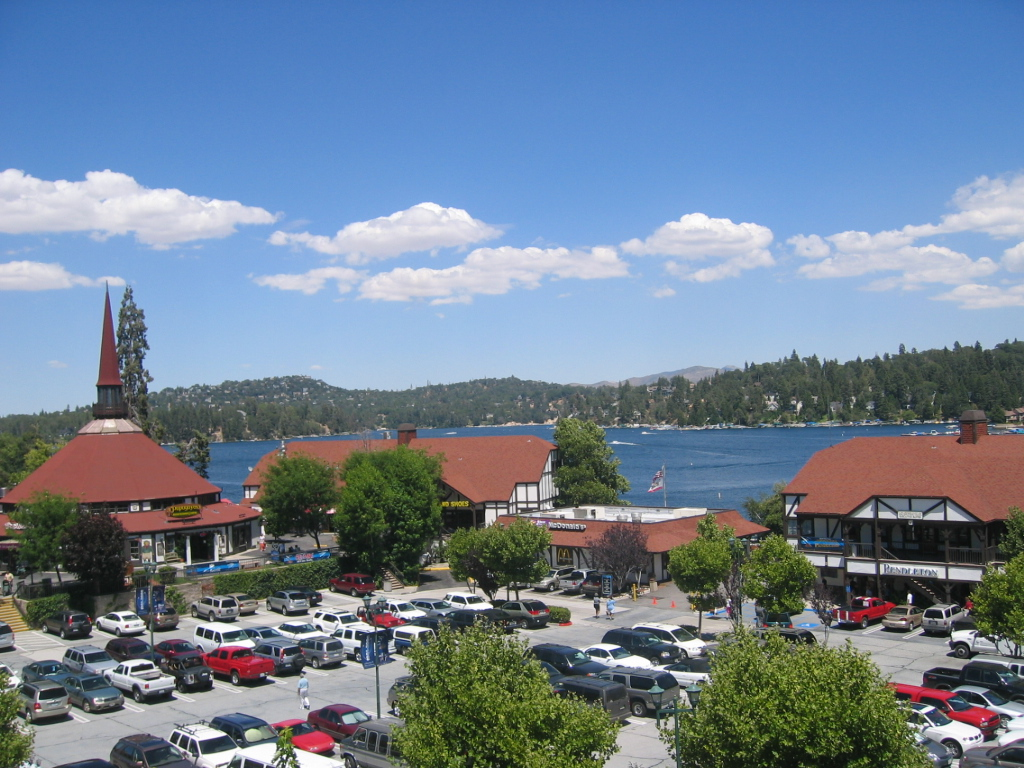
- Interactive map of Lake Arrowhead, California
- Location in Southern California Lake Arrowhead (California) Lake Arrowhead (the United States)
- Coordinates: 34°14′54″N 117°11′21″W
- Country: United States
- State: California
- County: San Bernardino
- Named for: Lake Arrowhead Reservoir

Area
  - Total: 18.902 sq mi (48.956 km^{2})
  - Land: 17.678 sq mi (45.786 km^{2})
  - Water: 1.224 sq mi (3.170 km^{2}) 6.48%
- Elevation: 5,174 ft (1,577 m)

Population (2020)
  - Total: 12,401
  - Density: 701.49/sq mi (270.85/km^{2})
- Time zone: UTC−8 (Pacific)
  - Summer (DST): UTC−7 (PDT)
- ZIP Code: 92352
- Area code: 909
- FIPS code: 06-39444
- GNIS feature IDs: 1652738, 2408532

Lake Arrowhead is an unincorporated community and a census-designated place (CDP) in the San Bernardino Mountains of San Bernardino County, California, surrounded by the San Bernardino National Forest, and surrounding the eponymous Lake Arrowhead Reservoir. Lake Arrowhead is located 13 miles (21 km) north east of the San Bernardino city limits. The population of the CDP was estimated at 12,401 in the 2020 census. It was called "Little Bear Lake" until around 1920, when a group from Los Angeles, the Arrowhead Lake Company, bought the lake and the land surrounding it, and changed its name to Arrowhead Lake.

Tourism is the primary economic generator for the area, contributing several million dollars per year to the county and providing hundreds of full-time and part-time jobs for local residents. The area is host to over four million visitors a year. Lake Arrowhead offers over 1,600 guest accommodations, including more than 1,200 licensed vacation rentals on platforms like Airbnb and VRBO, around 175 rooms at the Lake Arrowhead Resort & Spa, and over 100 rooms at the UCLA Lake Arrowhead Lodge.

== Economy ==
Lake Arrowhead Village, 1959.

As a scenic mountain resort in the San Bernardino Mountains, Lake Arrowhead's economy is almost completely supported by tourism, both by casual vacationers and part-time residents. The primary tourism industries include real estate, lodging, dining, recreation, and retail sales.

While Lake Arrowhead has no official town center, the Lake Arrowhead Village serves as the main commercial area for both locals and tourists and includes a number of factory outlets, boutiques, restaurants, two banks, a post office and a supermarket. One author visiting in 1978 described it as a "clean, Swiss-like community with many chalets." Lake Arrowhead Village also hosts events all year long including a free Summer Concert Series, the county's largest free Oktoberfest and many other themed events such as car shows, dog shows, the Tour de Lake Arrowhead, Home Expo, and the popular Antique Wooden Boat Show.

The University of California, Los Angeles operates the nearby UCLA Conference Center, a full-service conference facility with lodging and meeting space. Other major employers include Mountains Community Hospital and Rim of the World Unified School District.

Logging in the San Bernardino Mountains was once done on a large scale, with the Brookings Lumber Company operation one of the largest. It operated on 8,000 acres (32 km^{2}) between Fredalba and Hunsaker Flats (present-day Running Springs), between 1899 and 1912. It built a logging railroad to bring logs to the mill at Fredalba. The Shay locomotives had to be disassembled and hauled by wagon up the mountain, since the railroad operated in the high country but did not connect to other railroads in lowlands. Finished lumber was hauled by wagon down the steep grades to the Molino Box Factory in Highland, California.

== History ==
The area now known as Lake Arrowhead was originally called Little Bear Valley. In the late 1800s, developers began damming Little Bear Creek to create a reservoir for irrigation and hydroelectric use. By 1904, the Arrowhead Reservoir Company had taken over the project, but in 1913, a landmark court decision prohibited the diversion of water across watershed boundaries, halting further irrigation plans.

In 1920, a Los Angeles-based group purchased the lake and surrounding land, forming the Arrowhead Lake Company. Between 1921 and 1923, they built a Norman-style resort village that included a pavilion, outdoor theater, dance hall, golf course, beach, and hotel. The development officially opened in June 1922 and began attracting tourists and second-home buyers from Southern California.

Lake Arrowhead continued evolving as a resort destination through the mid-20th century, frequented by Hollywood celebrities and wealthy families. In 1960, businessman Jules Berman and partners acquired the lake property, launching new development through the Lake Arrowhead Development Company. By the late 1960s, the area was acquired by Boise Cascade, which subdivided large portions for residential sales before exiting in the early 1970s.

Today, much of Lake Arrowhead’s infrastructure—roads, water, and sewer systems—is managed by the Lake Arrowhead Community Services District (LACSD), which was formed in 1978 after the dissolution of prior private utilities.

== Legal challenges ==
Lake Arrowhead has faced multiple legal disputes related to land use, water rights, and environmental impacts.

=== Water Rights dispute with LACSD ===
In 2003, local property owners petitioned the California State Water Resources Control Board, arguing that the Lake Arrowhead Community Services District (LACSD) was withdrawing water from the lake without proper rights. In 2005, the Board ruled against LACSD, imposing fines and requiring the district to secure alternative water rights. A legal settlement was reached in 2006, allowing continued water use under regulated conditions.

Additional challenges emerged in 2005 when conservation groups sued over county approval of large housing developments, alleging violations of California environmental law. The project was ultimately halted in court.

=== Short-term rental (STR) access lawsuit ===
In 2020, the Arrowhead Lake Association (ALA) amended its bylaws to restrict lake and reserve-strip access for short-term renters—those staying less than 30 days. In response, a group of property owners organized as Vertical Web Ventures, sued ALA in San Bernardino County Superior Court in July 2022, alleging the change violated a 1964 agreement that guarantees access to owners and their lessees (including short-term renters).

By January 2022, Judge Gilbert Ochoa issued a preliminary injunction reinstating lake access for qualifying short-term renters and non-member property owners, finding they were likely to prevail in proving that ALA had overextended its authority under the 1964 agreement.

When the Superior Court injunction took effect, ALA issued new access rules allowing short-term renters to use the lake and tracks, provided they were listed on an ALA member’s permit and held an RFID card.

Following the injunction, the lawsuit was resolved through a settlement. Under the agreement, ALA:

- Revised its bylaws to allow short-term renters and non-member owners access to the lake when listed on a valid ALA permit;
- Agreed not to enforce Section C of its bylaws, which had previously banned those renters;
- Confirmed that compliance with the 1964 Agreement governs future access rules.

Although the detailed settlement terms were not publicly available in full, this resolution reinforced Vertical Web Ventures’ central argument—that ALA had overstepped by applying its bylaws inconsistently with the surface access rights guaranteed by the 1964 Agreement.

=== Arrowhead Water/Blue Triton lawsuit ===
Lake Arrowhead has also been cited in regulatory disputes surrounding bottled water. In 2023, state agencies intervened in spring water withdrawals used by Arrowhead-branded bottled water, citing environmental concerns. A 2025 court ruling later allowed some of those operations to resume.

=== PFAS contamination lawsuit ===
In 2025, class-action lawsuits were filed regarding PFAS contamination in the area’s drinking water. While local agencies maintained water safety, residents alleged exposure to harmful chemicals and sought damages.

== Geography ==
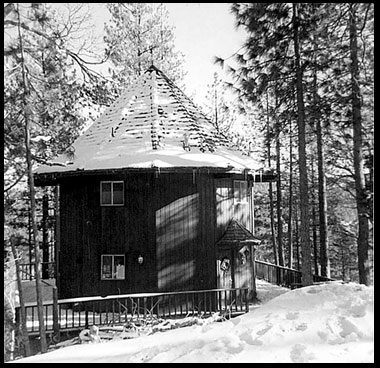
Lake Arrowhead weekend cabin designed by MGM film star Ruth Hussey

Lake Arrowhead is located in the Inland Empire region of Southern California, about 20 minutes north of the San Bernardino city limits. Its economic center is at the intersection of State Routes 173 and 189. The CDP has a total area of 19.0 square miles (49.1 km^{2}), of which 17.7 square miles (45.9 km^{2}) is land and 1.2 square miles (3.2 km^{2}; 6.46%) is water.

Lake Arrowhead is a private lake governed by the Arrowhead Lake Association and is for restricted use by Lake Arrowhead property owners.

Lake size: 782 acres (3.16 km^{2}) (capacity)
Shoreline: 14 miles (23 km)
Elevation: 5106.70 (capacity)
Maximum depth: 185 feet (56 m)
Lake width: 1.5 miles (2.4 km)
Lake length: 2.2 miles (3.5 km)

Outside of Lake Arrowhead Village there are several residential communities, which include Cedar Glen, Blue Jay, Rimforest, Skyforest, Twin Peaks, Crest Park, Hook Creek Tract, Deer Lodge Park, Arrowhead Villas, Grass Valley, and Agua Fria. There are three elementary schools, one middle school, and one high school in the area. 7 miles (11 km) north of Lake Arrowhead is the Pacific Crest Trail.

Santa's Village at Lake Arrowhead was a popular theme park from 1955 to 1998, and reopened in 2016. It was the first franchised one in the United States, with two others in the Santa Cruz Mountains and Illinois.

== Demographics ==
Historical population
Census	Pop.	Note	%±
1970	2,682		—
1980	6,272		133.9%
1990	6,539		4.3%
2000	8,934		36.6%
2010	12,424		39.1%
2020	12,401		−0.2%
U.S. Decennial Census; 1850–1870 1880-1890; 1900 1910 1920; 1930 1940 1950; 1960 1970 1980; 1990 2000 2010

Lake Arrowhead was first listed as an unincorporated place in the 1970 U.S. census; and then as a census designated place in the 1980 U.S. census.

=== 2020 census ===
As of the 2020 census, Lake Arrowhead had a population of 12,401. The population density was 701.5 inhabitants per square mile (270.9/km^{2}). The median age was 49.3 years. The age distribution was 19.0% under the age of 18, 6.6% aged 18 to 24, 20.2% aged 25 to 44, 29.2% aged 45 to 64, and 25.0% who were 65 years of age or older. For every 100 females, there were 101.3 males, and for every 100 females age 18 and over there were 100.9 males.

The census reported that 99.8% of the population lived in households and 20 people (0.2%) were institutionalized. In total, 96.0% of residents lived in urban areas and 4.0% lived in rural areas.

There were 5,113 households, of which 22.9% had children under the age of 18 living in them. Of all households, 53.0% were married-couple households, 4.9% were cohabiting-couple households, 20.0% had a male householder with no spouse or partner present, and 22.1% had a female householder with no spouse or partner present. About 26.9% of households were one-person households, and 13.0% had someone living alone who was 65 years of age or older. The average household size was 2.42, and there were 3,447 families (67.4% of all households).

There were 11,737 housing units at an average density of 663.9 units per square mile (256.3 units/km^{2}), of which 43.6% were occupied and 56.4% were vacant. Of occupied housing units, 77.3% were owner-occupied and 22.7% were occupied by renters. The homeowner vacancy rate was 3.9% and the rental vacancy rate was 18.6%.

Racial composition as of the 2020 census
Race	Number	Percent
White	9,227	74.4%
Black or African American	129	1.0%
American Indian and Alaska Native	97	0.8%
Asian	191	1.5%
Native Hawaiian and Other Pacific Islander	26	0.2%
Some other race	1,254	10.1%
Two or more races	1,477	11.9%
Hispanic or Latino (of any race)	3,022	24.4%

=== 2010 census ===
At the 2010 census Lake Arrowhead had a population of 12,424. The population density was 655.6 inhabitants per square mile (253.1/km^{2}). The racial makeup of Lake Arrowhead was 10,729 (86.4%) White (73.0% Non-Hispanic White), 95 (0.8%) African American, 93 (0.7%) Native American, 152 (1.2%) Asian, 33 (0.3%) Pacific Islander, 847 (6.8%) from other races, and 475 (3.8%) from two or more races. Hispanic or Latino of any race were 2,709 persons (21.8%).

The census reported that 12,389 people (99.7% of the population) lived in households, 16 (0.1%) lived in non-institutionalized group quarters, and 19 (0.2%) were institutionalized.

There were 4,672 households, 1,563 (33.5%) had children under the age of 18 living in them, 2,746 (58.8%) were opposite-sex married couples living together, 413 (8.8%) had a female householder with no husband present, 258 (5.5%) had a male householder with no wife present. There were 217 (4.6%) unmarried opposite-sex partnerships, and 64 (1.4%) same-sex married couples or partnerships. 984 households (21.1%) were one person and 358 (7.7%) had someone living alone who was 65 or older. The average household size was 2.65. There were 3,417 families (73.1% of households); the average family size was 3.07.

The age distribution was 3,043 people (24.5%) under the age of 18, 968 people (7.8%) aged 18 to 24, 2,571 people (20.7%) aged 25 to 44, 4,104 people (33.0%) aged 45 to 64, and 1,738 people (14.0%) who were 65 or older. The median age was 43.0 years. For every 100 females, there were 103.8 males. For every 100 females age 18 and over, there were 103.4 males.

There were 11,875 housing units at an average density of 626.6 per square mile, of the occupied units 3,428 (73.4%) were owner-occupied and 1,244 (26.6%) were rented. The homeowner vacancy rate was 7.9%; the rental vacancy rate was 12.4%. 8,647 people (69.6% of the population) lived in owner-occupied housing units and 3,742 people (30.1%) lived in rental housing units.

According to the 2010 United States Census, Lake Arrowhead had a median household income of $57,672, with 11.2% of the population living below the federal poverty line.

=== Demographic estimates ===
In 2023, the US Census Bureau estimated that 12.7% of the population were foreign-born. Of all people aged 5 or older, 75.0% spoke only English at home, 17.6% spoke Spanish, 3.5% spoke other Indo-European languages, 2.5% spoke Asian or Pacific Islander languages, and 1.4% spoke other languages. Of those aged 25 or older, 95.6% were high school graduates and 36.3% had a bachelor's degree.

=== Income and poverty ===
The median household income in 2023 was $88,147, and the per capita income was $52,386. About 5.6% of families and 11.9% of the population were below the poverty line.

== Government ==
In the California State Legislature, Lake Arrowhead is in the 19th senatorial district, represented by Republican Rosilicie Ochoa Bogh, and in the 34th Assembly district, represented by Republican Tom Lackey.

In the United States House of Representatives, Lake Arrowhead is in California's 23rd congressional district, represented by Republican Jay Obernolte. In the Senate, California is represented by Alex Padilla (D) and Adam Schiff (D).

== Arrowhead Woods Architectural Committee (AWAC) ==
The Arrowhead Woods Architectural Committee (AWAC) is a nonprofit organization responsible for enforcing the Covenants, Conditions, and Restrictions (CC&Rs) within the Arrowhead Woods residential tracts of Lake Arrowhead. Established in the early 1920s, AWAC’s role includes maintaining architectural design standards, regulating tree removal, and preserving the area's forested aesthetic.

AWAC is incorporated as a California non-profit (EIN 33‑0208452) and operates under recorded CC&Rs and court authority. In 2015, the San Bernardino County Superior Court confirmed AWAC as the legal successor-in-interest to enforce the CC&Rs, affirming their proper renewal. The committee collects fees and penalties from property owners for non-compliance or proposed property modifications.

In 2022, the California Legislature passed Senate Bill 1405, authorizing the Lake Arrowhead Community Services District (LACSD) to assume AWAC's responsibilities under specific conditions, including a property owner petition, public hearings, LAFCO approval, and adoption of an ordinance. However, the transfer was never completed. AWAC; under extreme pressure from the community, later advocated for repeal of SB 1405, and LACSD did not assume any enforcement duties. As of 2025, AWAC continues to independently enforce the CC&Rs.

AWAC is currently managing the 2025 CC&R renewal process internally. Ballots are not being counted by any third-party; instead, AWAC is handling the vote privately—“for privacy reasons the ballots will not be made public but only each individual voter may see his or her ballots”—without external audit or oversight.

== Climate ==
The Lake Arrowhead Community has a unique climate for Southern California with four distinct seasons which support an array of outdoor recreational activity and year-round beauty. Lake Arrowhead has a Warm-summer Mediterranean climate (Köppen climate classification Csb). During the summer, warm temperatures and monsoon thunderstorms are common. During the winter months, large Pacific storms bring plenty of snow. The area receives about 300 annual days of sunshine per year. Beginning in late 2011, a catastrophic drought began affecting Lake Arrowhead along with the rest of California. By November 2016, the lake level dropped 11.975 feet (3.650 m). This drop exposed much of the lake floor and beached most of the docks. As of February 2019, the lake has rebounded to just 2 feet (0.61 m) below the historical average.

Climate data for Lake Arrowhead, California, 1991–2020 normals, extremes 1941–2010
Month	Jan	Feb	Mar	Apr	May	Jun	Jul	Aug	Sep	Oct	Nov	Dec	Year
Record high °F (°C)	71 (22)	72 (22)	77 (25)	87 (31)	93 (34)	104 (40)	101 (38)	99 (37)	98 (37)	89 (32)	78 (26)	72 (22)	104 (40)
Mean daily maximum °F (°C)	44.4 (6.9)	44.9 (7.2)	52.0 (11.1)	60.0 (15.6)	67.0 (19.4)	76.4 (24.7)	81.1 (27.3)	81.8 (27.7)	74.2 (23.4)	63.0 (17.2)	51.5 (10.8)	43.0 (6.1)	61.6 (16.5)
Daily mean °F (°C)	36.5 (2.5)	37.4 (3.0)	41.8 (5.4)	48.0 (8.9)	53.9 (12.2)	62.8 (17.1)	69.1 (20.6)	69.4 (20.8)	63.0 (17.2)	52.9 (11.6)	42.7 (5.9)	36.0 (2.2)	51.1 (10.6)
Mean daily minimum °F (°C)	28.7 (−1.8)	29.8 (−1.2)	31.6 (−0.2)	36.1 (2.3)	40.8 (4.9)	49.1 (9.5)	57.1 (13.9)	57.1 (13.9)	51.9 (11.1)	42.8 (6.0)	33.8 (1.0)	29.1 (−1.6)	40.7 (4.8)
Record low °F (°C)	6 (−14)	5 (−15)	11 (−12)	15 (−9)	25 (−4)	30 (−1)	40 (4)	33 (1)	30 (−1)	18 (−8)	13 (−11)	6 (−14)	5 (−15)
Average precipitation inches (mm)	8.36 (212)	9.87 (251)	5.17 (131)	2.76 (70)	1.15 (29)	0.26 (6.6)	0.12 (3.0)	0.13 (3.3)	0.31 (7.9)	2.06 (52)	2.37 (60)	5.17 (131)	37.73 (956.8)
Average snowfall inches (cm)	3.0 (7.6)	5.3 (13)	6.7 (17)	2.8 (7.1)	0.8 (2.0)	0.0 (0.0)	0.0 (0.0)	0.0 (0.0)	0.0 (0.0)	0.0 (0.0)	0.3 (0.76)	3.5 (8.9)	22.4 (56.36)
Average precipitation days (≥ 0.01 in)	6.3	6.9	5.3	3.3	1.7	0.6	0.7	0.5	0.8	2.0	2.5	4.1	34.7
Average snowy days (≥ 0.1 in)	1.2	1.2	1.0	0.7	0.1	0.0	0.0	0.0	0.0	0.0	0.1	0.6	4.9
Source 1: NOAA
Source 2: XMACIS2

=== Inclement weather ===
Heavy snow and winds have caused major power outages in the area. A storm in the last week of December 2021 left many homes without power for a week. Similarly on Thanksgiving weekend 2019, homes were without power for up to four days.

== In popular culture ==
Lake Arrowhead has appeared in a variety of movies, including The Squaw Man (1914), The High Hand (1926), The Wolf Dog (1933), Fighting Trooper (1934), Heidi (1937), Of Human Hearts (1938), Down in 'Arkansaw' (1938), Spawn of the North (1938), North of the Yukon (1939), Comin' Round The Mountain (1940), Untamed (1940), The Royal Mounted Patrol (1941), Wild Geese Calling (1941), North of the Rockies (1942), Can't Help Singing (1943), The Yearling (1946), Sand (1949), The Parent Trap (1961), Seven Days in May (1964), The Great Race (1965), Boy, Did I Get a Wrong Number! (1966), Pufnstuff (1970), The Roommates (1973), and The Laundromat (2019).

Of special note, the exterior shots for the movie Sunrise: A Song of Two Humans (1927) were filmed here. The film won three Academy Awards at the very first Academy Awards ceremony in 1929.

In addition, the Lake Arrowhead Conference Center (or a set made to look like it) was the setting for the TV series Dragnet, Season 3, Episode 13 of the 1960s re-boot, where Friday and Gannon attend a conference for Los Angeles Police Department officers to discuss problems and solutions.

Lake Arrowhead is mentioned in passing in Raymond Chandler's 1939 detective novel The Big Sleep.

== Arts and sciences ==
The Lake Arrowhead Communities have numerous cultural events and organizations. The Arrowhead Arts Association is a non-profit corporation dedicated to cultural enrichment sponsoring quality musical performances and providing musical education and scholarships for local youth from preschool through college. The Mountain Skies Astronomical Society is also located there.

== Education ==
It is in the Rim of the World Unified School District.

== Architecture ==
Located approximately 80 miles (130 km) from downtown Los Angeles, many Hollywood stars and wealthy Angelinos built homes in the area starting in the 1920s and 30s. These homes and estates were designed by some of the most significant architects practicing in Southern California at the time. These architects included:

- John Byers
- Roland Coate
- Robert Farquhar
- Gordon Kaufman
- Marston, Van Pelt & Maybury
- Morgan, Walls & Clements
- Lutah Marie Riggs
- Lloyd Wright (Frank Lloyd Wright's son)
- Rudolf Schindler
- McNeal Swasey
- Paul Revere Williams
- William Woollett

In the early years of development, the architectural committee of the resort community mandated that homes be built in the French Norman or English Tudor Style. Rudolf Schindler, a modernist architect, designed what is known as the first modern A-frame house in 1936 for Gisela Bennati, as his interpretation of French Norman style architecture. The first known sketches for the Bennati Cabin date from 1934. Schindler did sketches for "triangle-based house designs" as early as 1922, but none of those designs were built. Lake Arrowhead is also home to what has been sometimes referred to as the world’s largest A-frame structure, the clubhouse of the Lake Arrowhead Country Club.

The following is a list of people who have owned or built homes in Lake Arrowhead: John O'Melveny, J.B. Van Nuys (one of the developers of Lake Arrowhead and son of Isaac Newton Van Nuys, founder of Van Nuys, CA), Rhoda Rindge & Merritt Adamson (founders of Malibu, CA), John Northrop, Katherine Iten (Iten Biscuit Company/NABISCO), Edward L. Doheny, Jules Stein, Conrad "Nicky" Hilton, Jr., Dan Dureya, Max Factor, Thomas F. Hamilton, Prince Massianoff, Leo McCarey, Charlie Chaplin, Myrna Loy, Ruth Hussey, Shirley Temple, Lon Chaney, Doris Day, June Lockhart, Walter Huston, Robert Taylor, Loretta Young, Liberace, Brian Wilson, Priscilla Presley and Frankie Avalon to name a few.

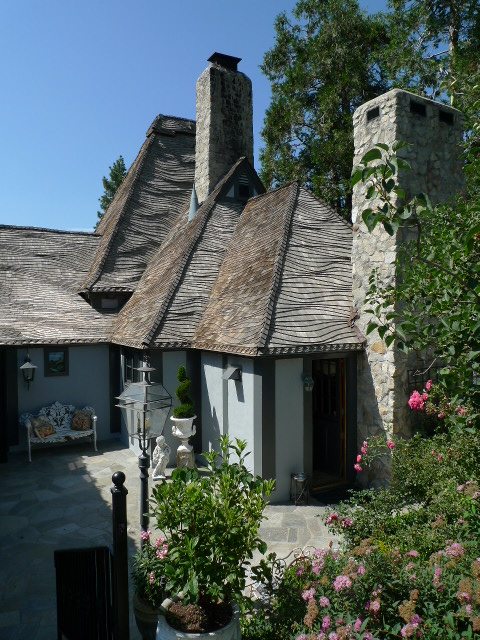
Dan Dureya House, "Minkot", Swasey & McAfee, Architects, 1923

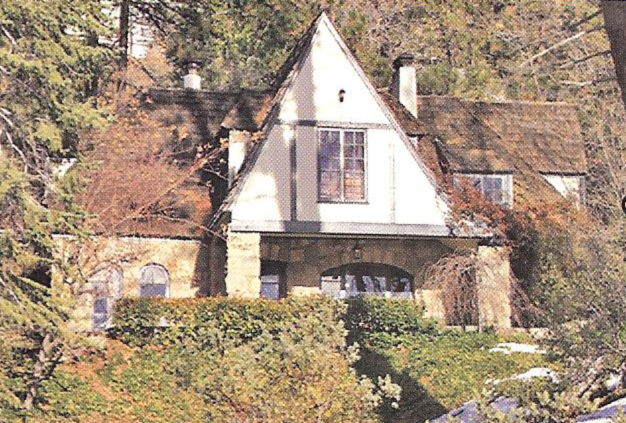
Prince Massianoff House, Chas.Bugg, Architect/Builder, 1923

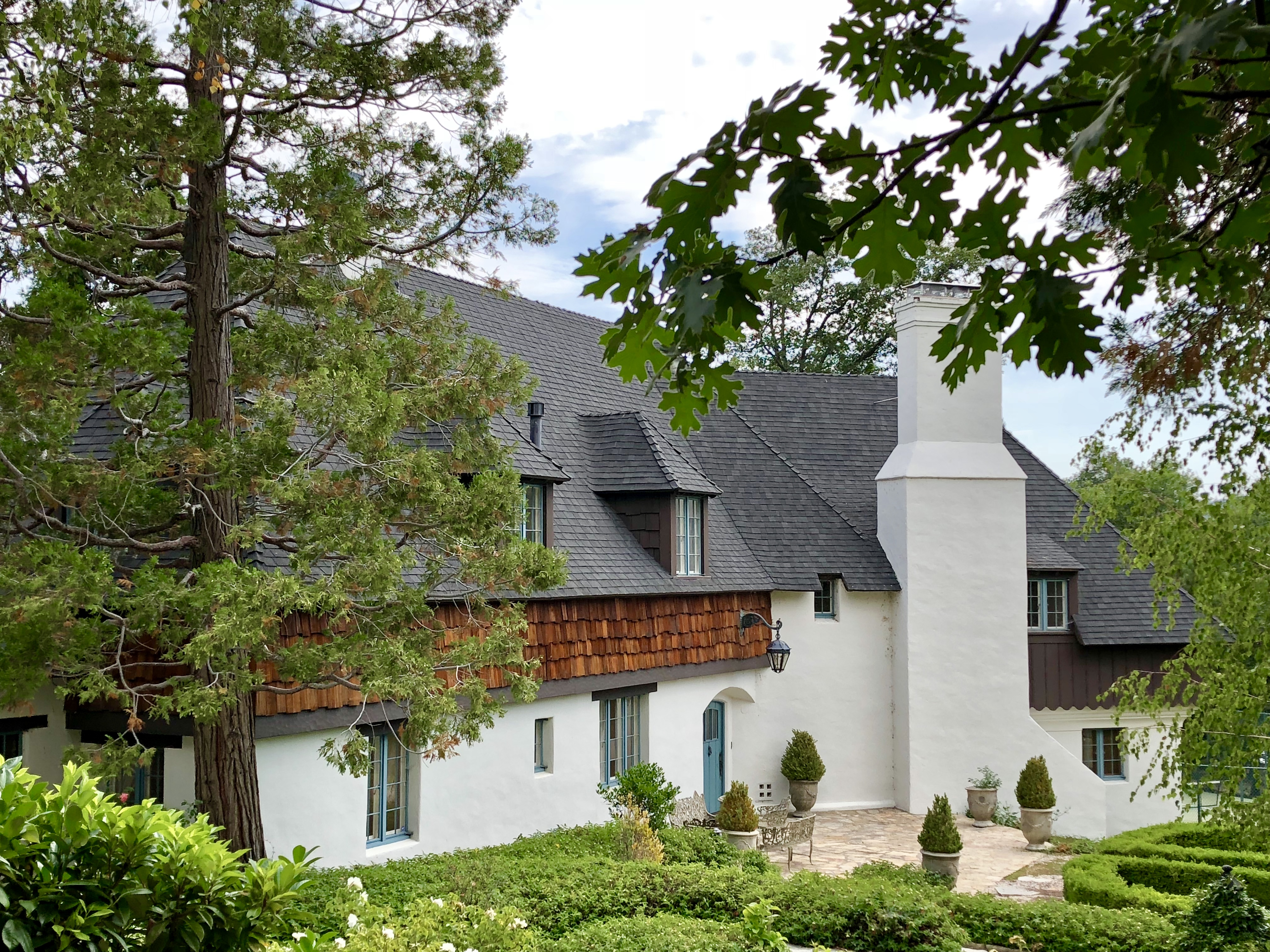
"Shady Point", Roland Coate Architect,1927

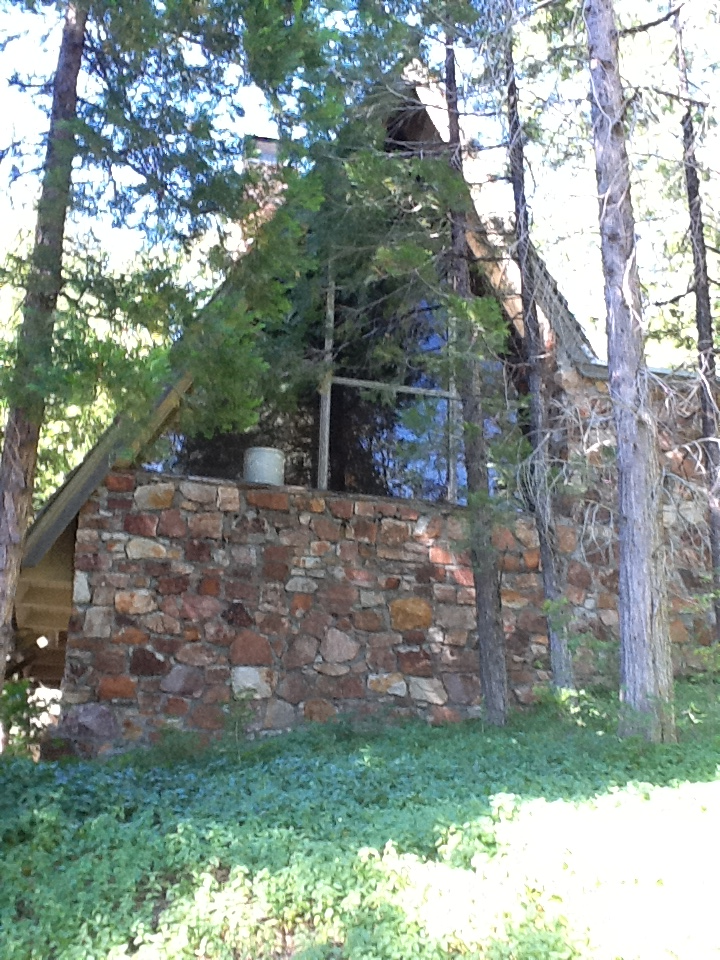
Bennati Cabin, Rudolf Schindler, Architect, 1934

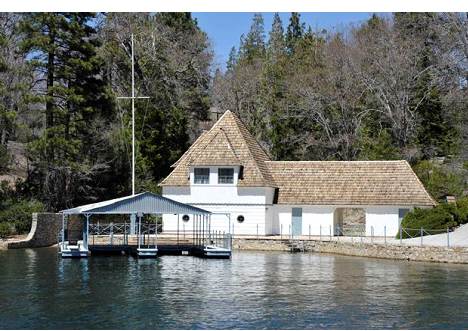
"Happy Landing", Doheny Estate, Dock House, Gordon Kaufman, Architect, 1935

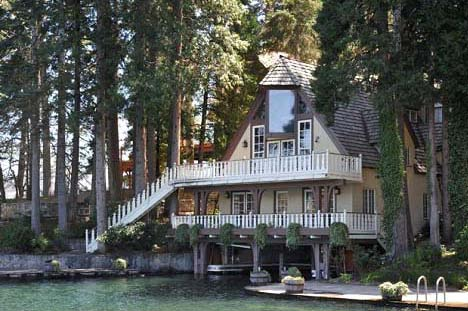
Hamiltair Boathouse, Paul Williams, Architect, 1936

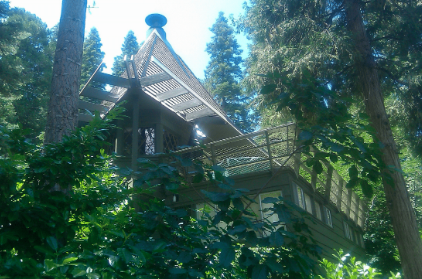
House, Lloyd Wright, Architect, 1963
