= Bitter Spring (San Bernardino County) =

Spring in San Bernardino County, California, United States

Bitter Spring is a spring within the Fort Irwin National Training Center in San Bernardino County, California. It lies at an elevation of 1355 feet and is located in a valley between the Soda Mountains to the east, the Tiefort Mountains to the northwest, Alvord Mountain to the southwest and Cronese Mountains to the south and southeast.

== History ==
=== Early history ===
Bitter Spring was a water and food source for the Native American peoples who lived in this part of the desert. It became a watering and grazing place between Salt Spring and the Mojave River on the Old Spanish Trail. It passed 38.75 miles south through Silurian Valley, then east through the Avawatz Mountains at Red Pass and beyond the playa of Red Pass Lake, through a gap between the Soda and Tiefort Mountains to Bitter Spring in a wash in the next valley. From Bitter Spring the trail led 18.75 miles southwest climbing Alvord Mountain to cross Impassable Pass to descend Spanish Canyon and cross the plains to the location of Fork of the Road on the north side of the Mojave River where it met the Mohave Trail, that had become another branch of the Old Spanish Trail, often called the Main Branch that later became a wagon road called Government Road or Mojave Road.

From 1847, the Old Spanish Trail became a wagon road, later called the Mormon Road pioneered by a party of Mormons led by Jefferson Hunt that first traveled back and forth on it in 1847–1848. From 1849 it became known by the Forty-Niners as the "Southern Route" of the California Trail, the winter route of the Forty-niners, Mormons, and other immigrants to California. From 1855 after the route was modified and improvements made by the State of California in Cajon Pass and by the Federal government in Utah Territory, it became the winter trade route and wagon road between Utah Territory and California, it was known as the Los Angeles - Salt Lake Road.

In the early 1850s, Solomon Nunes Carvalho while traveling the road, described the water of Bitter Spring as not bitter but with a brackish taste and that the surrounding area had acres of the finest bunch grass. The thorns of mesquite bushes there were used to post notes for following travelers. Their parties were often spaced out between springs to avoid depleting them with overuse as it would cause delay and depletion of the surrounding feed, as a spring refilled itself. Just to the west of the springs was a large hill that was called "The Whale" (at 35°11′57″N 116°26′22″W) which the road passed around to the north, before turning southwest to Alvord Mountain, Impassable Pass, Spanish Canyon and more desert to the Mojave River.

=== Camp Bitter Springs ===
Camp Bitter Springs was established near Bitter Spring by the U. S. Army, First Regiment of Dragoons as an intermittent camp for patrols along the Los Angeles - Salt Lake Road in 1859. In April 1860 Major James Henry Carleton was appointed commander of the Bitter Spring Expedition following two incidents. One was the killing of a cattleman in January 1860, on the Mojave River, reportedly by Southern Paiutes. Two months later two unarmed teamsters were killed at Bitter Spring by Native American men thought to be Paiute who had posed as friends before suddenly turning on them, feathering them with arrows. Brevet General Newman S. Clarke, Carlton's superior, commanding the Department of California, in San Francisco, ordered him to "proceed to Bitter Springs and chastise the Indians you find in the vicinity." The General specifically instructed Carleton that "the punishment must fall on those dwelling nearest to the place of the murder or frequenting the water course in its vicinity." Carlton at the head of Company K, First Regiment of Dragoons left the fort in early April.

After arriving and establishing his base at Camp Cady Carlton sent out patrols looking for hostiles. On April 22, on Carlton's orders, the bodies of two Native American men, earlier slain by a detachment of Dragoons on the Mojave River at the Fish Ponds, were taken to Bitter Spring. There at the site of the earlier attack on the cattleman and the teamsters, the bodies were hung from an improvised scaffold. A few days after a May 2 engagement at Old Dad Mountain, the heads cut off of the three natives killed there were placed on display with those hung on the gibbet at Bitter Creek. On May 28, following reports of the display in the San Francisco press and after General Clarke had read Carlton's dispatch telling of the display of severed heads at Bitter Spring, Clarke ordered Carleton to cease mutilating the dead and remove all evidence of the mutilation from public gaze. The post remained at the spring to guard travelers on the road, until abandoned on July 3, 1860 at the end of Carlton's expedition.
