= Fort Irwin National Training Center =

- San Bernardino County, California
- NTC's shoulder sleeve insignia

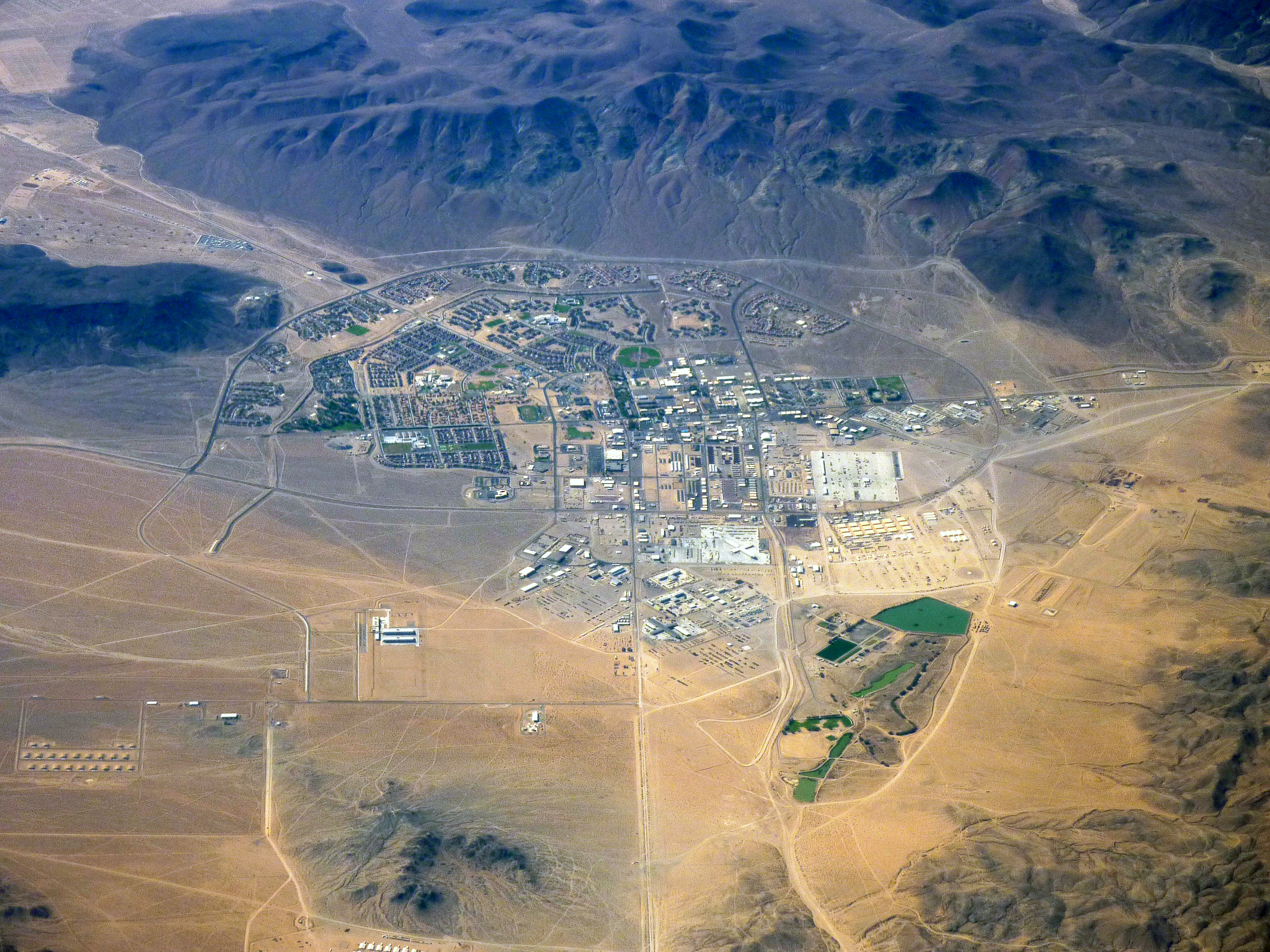
- An aerial view of Fort Irwin, 2009

Site information
- Type: Training center
- Owner: United States Army
- Controlled by: United States Army Combined Arms Command
- Condition: In use

Location
- Position in California Fort Irwin (the United States)
- Coordinates: 35°14′47″N 116°40′55″W

Site history
- Built: 1940
- In use: 1940–1942; 1951–1972; 1980–present.

Garrison information
- Current commander: BG Brandon Anderson (Commanding General); COL Steven L. Chadwick (Garrison Commander)
- Occupants: Blackhorse Operations Group: Ghost Team (Information Advantage) Bronco Team (Brigade Trainers) Scorpions (the Green Team, America’s First O/C team) Cobras (the Blue Team, the Cavalry Trainers) The Mighty Goldminer Team

Fort Irwin National Training Center (Fort Irwin NTC) is a major training area for the United States military in the Mojave Desert in northern San Bernardino County, California. Fort Irwin is at an average elevation of 2,454 feet (748 m). It is located 37 miles (60 km) northeast of Barstow, in the Calico Mountains.

The National Training Center is part of the US Army Combined Arms Command (CAC). The opposing force at the National Training Center is the 11th Armored Cavalry Regiment, the Blackhorse Cavalry, who are stationed at the base to provide an opposing force to units on a training rotation at Fort Irwin. In September 2017, a state-of-the-art hospital was opened that provides healthcare services to the Fort Irwin beneficiaries.

Fort Irwin works within the R-2502 Special Use Airspace Complex.

== History ==
The Fort Irwin area has a history dating back almost 15,000 years, when Native Americans of the Lake Mojave Period were believed to have lived in the area. Native American settlements and pioneer explorations in the area were first recorded when the Spanish missionary Padre Francisco Garces traveled the Mohave Trail with Mohave Indian guides in 1776. During his travels, he noted several small bands of Indians, and is believed to have been the first European to make contact with the Native Americans of the area.

Jedediah Smith is thought to have been the first European American to explore the area in 1826. A fur trapper, Smith was soon followed by other pioneers traveling the Old Spanish Trail between Santa Fe and Los Angeles. The trail crossed the area on the eastern edge of Fort Irwin, between Salt Spring and the Mojave River. The Old Spanish Trail passed through Silurian Valley, then west through the Avawatz Mountains at Red Pass and beyond the playa of Red Pass Lake, through a gap between the Soda and Tiefort Mountains to Bitter Spring in a wash in the next valley.

Bitter Spring was the only reliable watering and grazing place along the route. From Bitter Spring the trail led 18.75 miles (30.18 km) southwest climbing Alvord Mountain to cross Impassable Pass to descend Spanish Canyon and cross the plains to the location of Fork of the Road on the north side of the Mojave River where it met the Mohave Trail.

In 1844, Captain John C. Fremont, accompanied by Kit Carson, was the first member of the US Army to visit the Fort Irwin area. Captain Fremont established a camp near Bitter Springs as he pioneered a route that served travelers on the Old Spanish Trail, and later the Mormon Road, linking Salt Lake City to California. This camp was later to become an important water and grazing place for pioneers crossing the Mojave Desert during California's settlement and gold rush.

The California Gold Rush brought prosperous trade and unexpected trouble to the area. As California grew, and more travelers and freighters used the Mormon Road to cross the territory between California and Utah, raids and horse stealing became a problem. In 1847, the Army's Mormon Battalion patrolled the Fort Irwin area to control the raiding and horse stealing. By 1855 it became part of the route of the freight wagon road between Los Angeles and Salt Lake City. During the Bitter Spring Expedition in 1860 the Army constructed Camp Bitter Springs, a small stone fort overlooking Bitter Spring and patrolled the Fort Irwin area.

In the 1880s the area experienced an economic boom with the discovery of borax at Death Valley. From the late 19th century to the early 20th century, the area began to grow tremendously as mining operations of all types flourished. Soon railroads, workers, and businesses led to the establishment of the nearby town of Barstow.

The years following the Indian Wars were quiet militarily. In 1940, President Franklin D. Roosevelt established the Mojave Anti-Aircraft Range, a military reservation of approximately 1,000 square miles (3,000 km^{2}) in the area of the present Fort Irwin. In 1942, the Mojave Anti-Aircraft Range was renamed Camp Irwin, in honor of Major General George LeRoy Irwin, commander of the 57th Field Artillery Brigade during World War I, and it was subsumed into the Desert Training Center as one of its cantonment areas and some of its ranges. Two years later, Camp Irwin was deactivated and placed on surplus status.

In 1951, Camp Irwin reopened its gates as the Armored Combat Training Area, and served as a training center for combat units during the Korean War. Regimental tank companies of the U.S. 43d Infantry Division from Camp Pickett, Virginia were the first to train at the new facility.

In August 1961, the garrison was designated a permanent installation and renamed Fort Irwin. During the Vietnam buildup, many units, primarily artillery and engineer, trained and deployed from Fort Irwin.

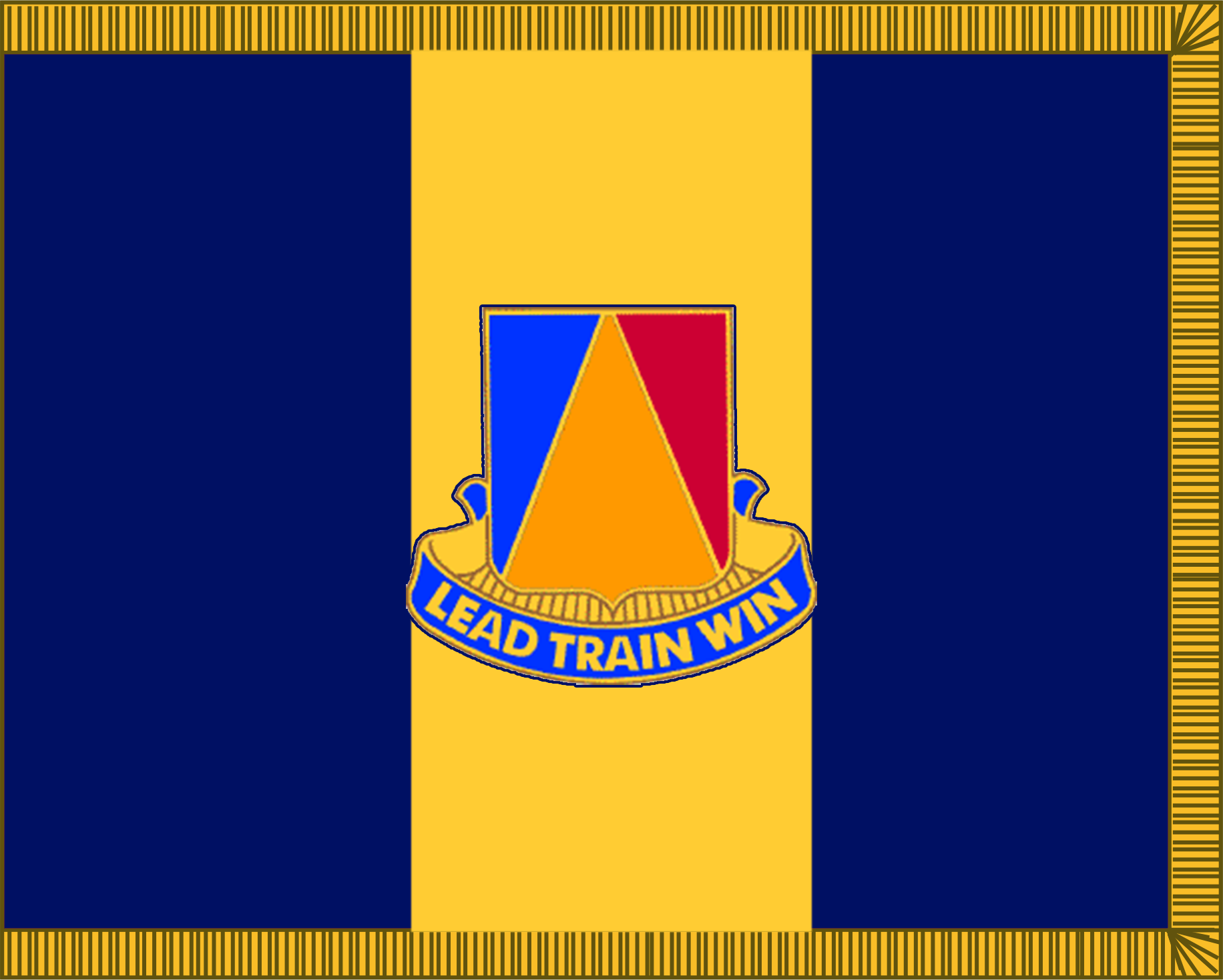
National Training Center Flag

In January 1971, the garrison was deactivated again and placed in maintenance status under the control of Fort MacArthur (Los Angeles), California. The California National Guard assumed responsibility for the garrison and from 1972 to 1980, Fort Irwin was used primarily as a training area by Army National Guard and U.S. Army Reserve units.

=== National Training Center ===
On 9 August 1979, the Department of the Army announced that Fort Irwin had been selected as National Training Center (NTC). The location – an isolated area – was ideal because of its over 1,000 square miles (2,600 km^{2}) capacity for maneuver and ranges, its uncluttered electromagnetic spectrum, and its restricted airspace. The National Training Center was officially activated 16 October 1980, and Fort Irwin was transferred from the California Army National Guard back to the Regular Army returning into active status on 1 July 1981.

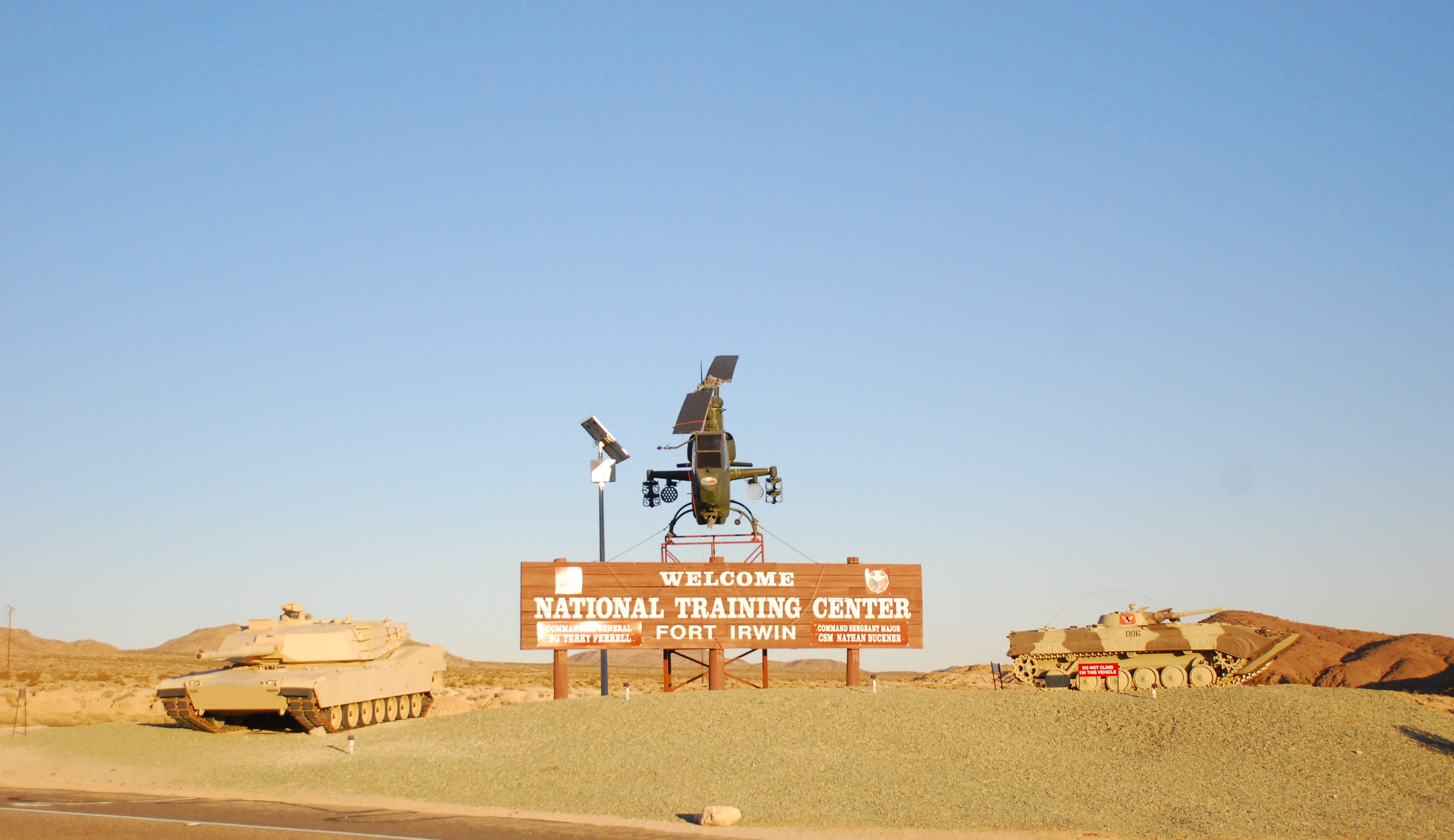
NTC Fort Irwin's welcome sign

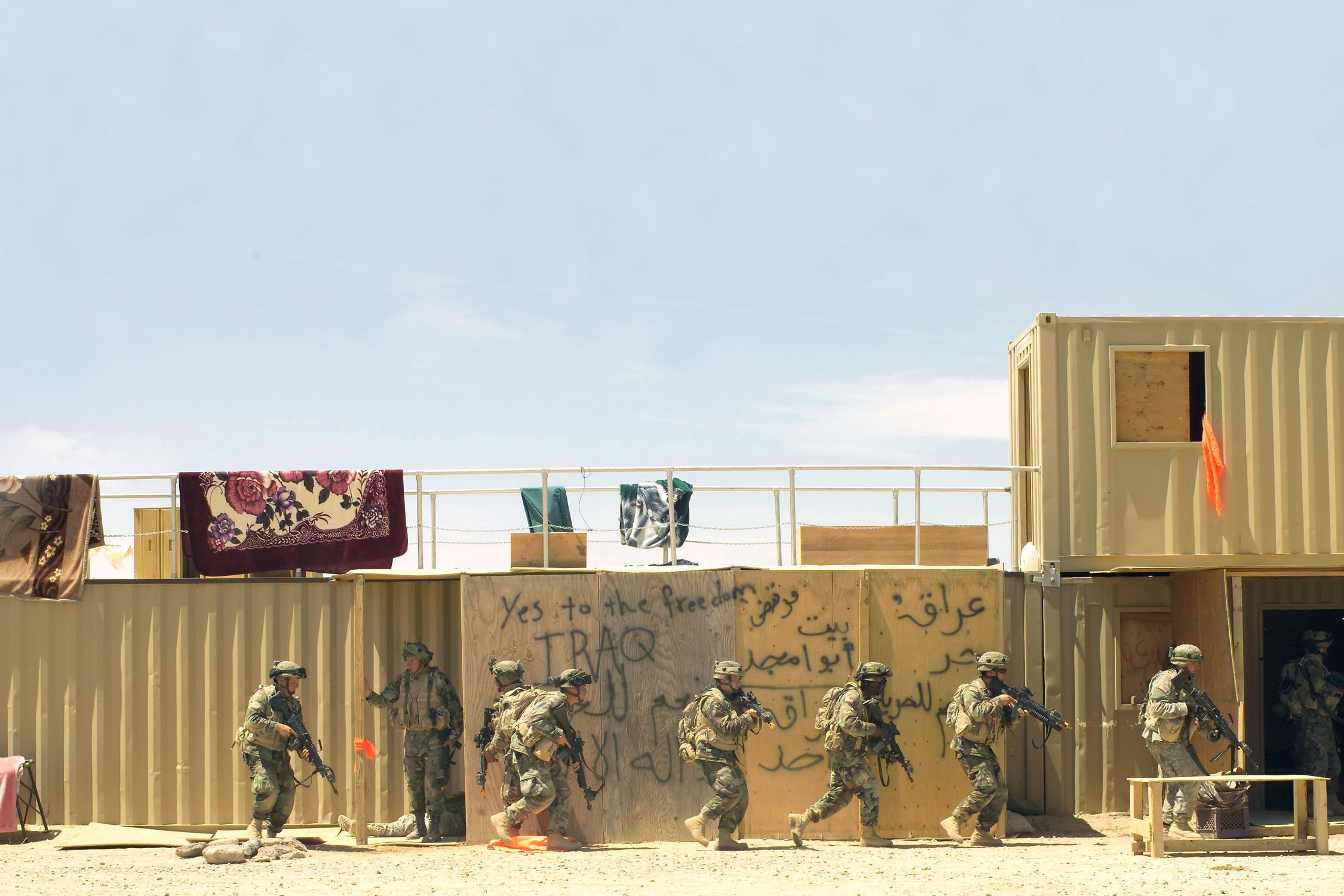
Soldiers move forward to search a building during training at the National Training Center. Long known for large-scale tank vs. tank battles, NTC has provided extensive training in urban operations since September 2005.

The NTC was unique in its training approach in the use of Real Time Location System (originally a General Dynamics microwave transponder system; later replaced by GPS); the use of lasers to simulate direct fire (including small arms); and the use of real time interactive computer models for indirect fire along with Air to Ground and Ground to Air missile systems. Originally developed as a prototype by the US Army's Fort Hunter-Liggett with Systems and Software design the BDM, the NTC system was the first to augment After Action Reviews of training exercises with video and maneuver overlays including time stamped combat events.

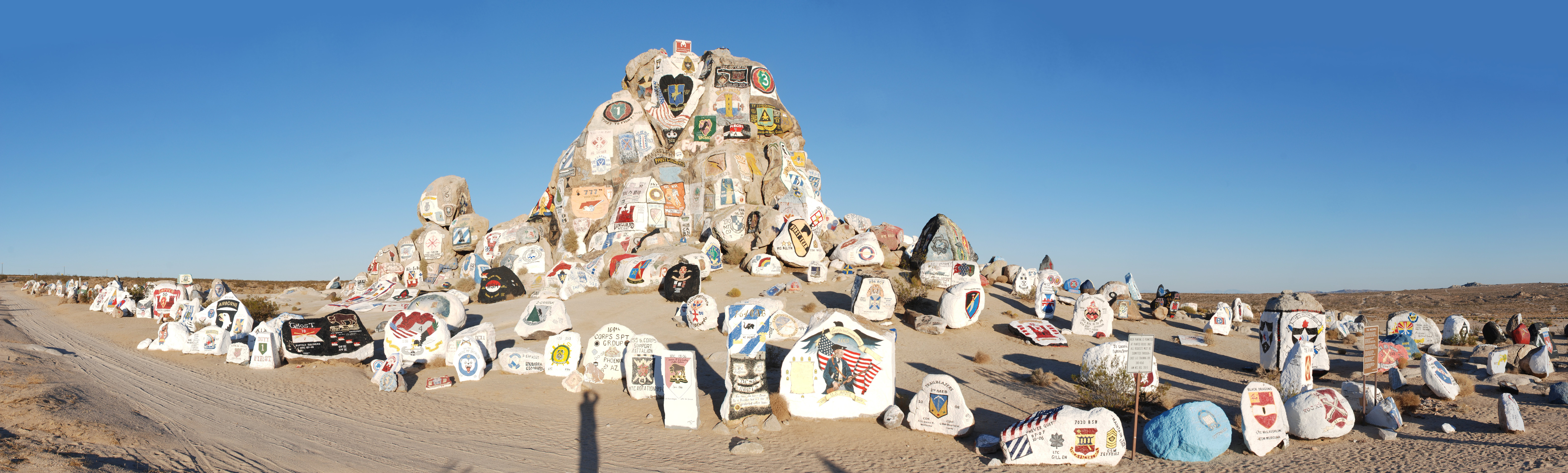
Rock formation painted by units visiting Ft. Irwin

Since its activation, the NTC has witnessed many other firsts. Among the first units to train against the Opposing Force (OPFOR) were 1st Battalion, 22nd Infantry and 1st Battalion 77th Armor, 4th Infantry Division (Mech) from Fort Carson, Colorado in Spring 1978 as a proof of concept FX for establishing Irwin as the NTC, the 3rd Battalion 67th Armor, 2nd Armored Division from Fort Hood, Texas in operation TASK FORCE IRWIN III, 1 Aug – 14 Sept, 1979, and 3rd Brigade, 1st Cavalry Division from Fort Hood, Texas in spring 1981.

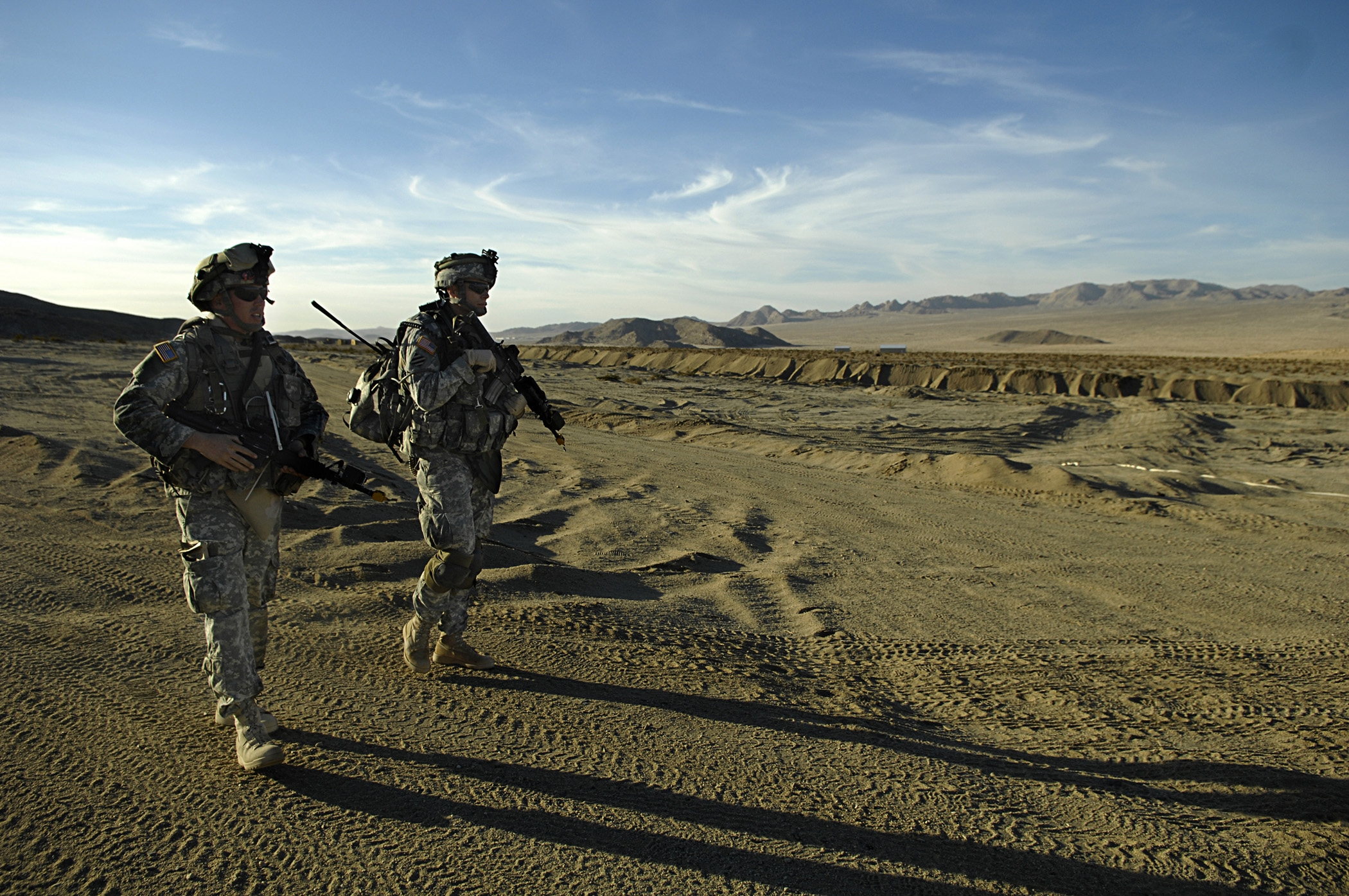
Troops from the 3rd Infantry patrol the California desert during a training mission.

Ft Irwin and the 1st CAV tested and implemented the Multiple Integrated Laser Engagement System (MILES). Infantry and armor units first augmented the Opposing Force in 1984 as a detachment of the 7th infantry Division, Fort Ord CA. June 1985 saw the first use of M1 Abrams tanks and later in the fall of 1985 saw the M2 Bradley fighting vehicles on the NTC battlefield. The first armored cav. squadron rotation occurred in November 1984. Units from the 101st Airborne Division participated in the first light force rotation in March 1985. The 197th Infantry Brigade participated in the first extended rotation with brigade operations in June 1985. The first combined Light/Mechanized Infantry rotation took place in February 1990; the 7th Infantry Division (Light) from Fort Ord and the 24th Infantry Division (Mechanized) from Fort Stewart, Georgia participated. The first MOUT (Military Operations in Urban Terrain) mission was conducted at the NTC Pioneer Training Facility in December 1993.

== Opposing Forces (OPFOR) ==
In 1980, during the re-opening of the NTC, the OPFOR consisted of a re-activation of the 6th Battalion, 31st Infantry, "The Polar Bears," from the 7th Infantry Division, based in Fort Ord, California, and the 1st Battalion, 73rd Armor. In 1985, once the US Army turned to regimental units, the OPFOR was redesignated the 177th Armored Brigade (SEP).

The OPFOR soldiers were dressed in Soviet-style armor uniforms including black berets, Soviet-style insignias, and used M551 Sheridans visually modified to resemble BMP-1 vehicles and T-72 tanks. In their OPFOR role, the Infantry Battalion was designated as the 32nd Guards Motorized Rifle Regiment. U.S. Marine Corps (USMC), U.S. Army Reserve and Army National Guard units would support infantry roles for the OPFOR.

Air support and air combat tactics came from USAF fighter wings operating from Nellis AFB and George AFB. USN strike squadrons operated from NAS Lemoore, USMC fighter/attack squadrons operated from MCAS El Toro, and USMC helicopter attack squadrons operated from MCAS Tustin. In the 1990s, when George AFB, MCAS El Toro and MCAS Tustin were closed as a result of Base Realignment and Closure Commission actions, USAF air support shifted to composite fighter wings from Nellis AFB, Hill AFB, Luke AFB and Davis-Monthan AFB. USMC air support shifted to MCAS Miramar (formerly NAS Miramar), MCAS Yuma and MCAS Camp Pendleton.

In the 1980s and 1990s, the NTC showcased US Army large-scale tactics to foreign military leaders from all over the world. The OPFOR ran 15 training rotations a year against armored brigades from both Active and Reserve Component US Army units from all over the United States. The command centers of these large-scale battles were computerized in a central command post, where each battle was recorded and analyzed. The results were debriefed to the participants.

After the September 11, 2001 attacks, the NTC transformed to focus on continuous counterinsurgency ops that reflected a rapidly changing battlefield, especially in desert climate environments.

Following the United States withdraw from Afghanistan in 2021 and the Russian invasion of Ukraine in early 2022, The National Training Center began to train soldiers for future fights against major near-peer adversaries.

== Description ==
The Post is composed of the Fort Irwin garrison with general support facilities such as:

- Post Emergency Services
- Public Affairs Service
- Veterinary Service
- Housing, Financial, Admin and Community Services
- Religious Support and Social Services
- Human Resources and Civilian Personnel Services
- Environmental and Safety Office
- Public Works

The National Training Center element of the Post which consists of the following units:

- 11th Armored Cavalry Regiment (Blackhorse) acting as the 'enemy' for all training visiting units.
- 916th Support Brigade providing support to the installation, and sustainment for visiting units and their operations.
- The National Training Center (NTC) Operations Group which is responsible for all live training events.
- The Joint Center of Excellence is facilitating individual, collective and unit counter IED training; evaluating existing and developing new operational techniques, tactical procedures and counter IED equipment concepts.
- The Mission and Installation Contracting Command is responsible for the maintenance and logistics of all NTC and garrison facilities.
- The Reserve Component Operations Plans and Training (RCOPT) facilitates integration of all reserve component formations at the NTC. It also serves as the NTC Command Group's advisor on all reserve component matters and educates all reserve units.

The NTC at Fort Irwin continues to serve as one of the US Army's main training centers. All US military services, as well as other government agencies and some foreign military units train at the NTC. A common tradition for any visiting military unit is to paint their sign on one of the rock formations near the main gate. Units of all types and locations are represented.

NTC training is not easy. The exercises incorporate complex scenarios exposing the units to detailed hybrid threats. Facing a strong opposing force and an insurgent force, at the same time, they must assist local people in towns and villages in the area in any way possible.

One of the NTC features is the presence of 12 mock-up "villages" used to train troops in Military Operations in Urban Terrain (MOUT) prior to their deployment. Collectively known as the fictional country of Atropia, these villages have religious sites, hotels, traffic circles, etc. filled with foreign 'locals'. These are Arabic speaking roleplaying actors portraying government officials, local militia, police, military, villagers, street vendors and insurgents. They will confront the military with all kinds of all-day problems.

The largest two villages are known as Razish and Ujen, the closest located about 30 minutes from the main part of the post. The largest village has 585 buildings that can engage an entire brigade combat team into a fight. The training uses simulated and live Unmanned Aircraft Systems (UAS), the Multiple Integrated Laser Engagement System (MILES) and incorporates multi-national forces and social media actions.

Observer, Controller and Trainers (OCTs) are embedded with the training units from brigade down to platoon level. Some villages are completely instrumented, including video recording, to assist the OC/T teams in providing feedback to the training unit.

== Geography ==
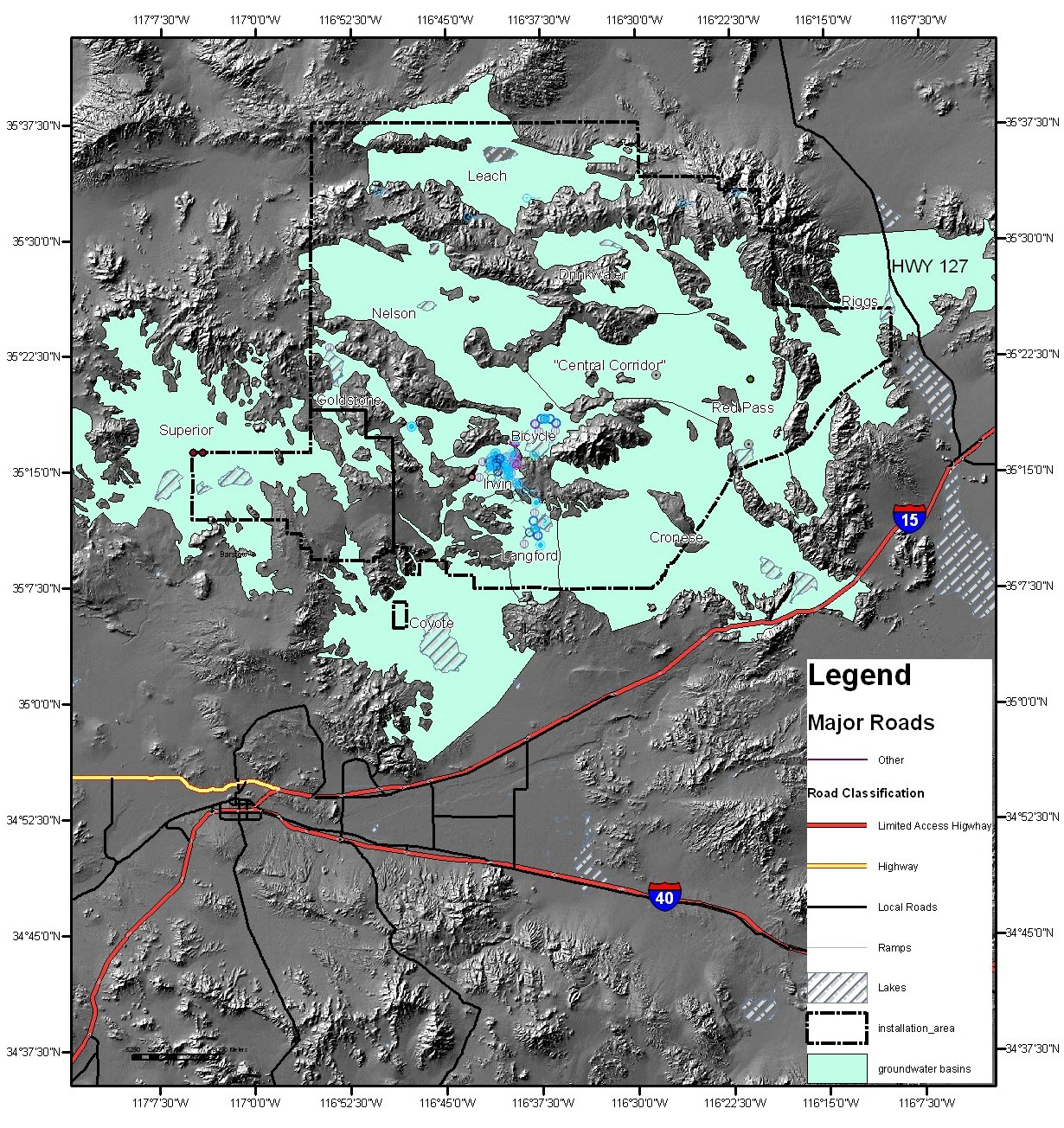
A United States Geological Survey map showing the Fort Irwin National Training Center boundary, drainage basin boundaries, and areas of interest.

Fort Irwin has a total area of 2,579.77 km^{2} (996.05 sq mi). 0.3277 km^{2} of this area is water, according to the United States Census Bureau. The CDP covers an area of 7.1 square miles (18 km^{2}), all of it land.

The Goldstone Deep Space Communications Complex is within its territory on the western side. The ZIP Code is 92310. The reservation is inside area codes 442 and 760.

== Climate ==
Fort Irwin has a hot desert climate within the Köppen climate classification system, abbreviated "BWh" on climate maps.

Climate data for Bicycle Lake AAF Elev: 2,350ft (1982, 1986, 1991-1998, 2006, 2010-2014 normals)
Month	Jan	Feb	Mar	Apr	May	Jun	Jul	Aug	Sep	Oct	Nov	Dec	Year
Record high °F (°C)	77 (25)	86 (30)	91 (33)	96 (36)	107 (42)	113 (45)	113 (45)	114 (46)	106 (41)	102 (39)	86 (30)	74 (23)	114 (46)
Mean daily maximum °F (°C)	58 (14)	62 (17)	69 (21)	76 (24)	83 (28)	95 (35)	100 (38)	99 (37)	93 (34)	79 (26)	65 (18)	57 (14)	78 (26)
Mean daily minimum °F (°C)	42 (6)	43 (6)	49 (9)	53 (12)	59 (15)	69 (21)	76 (24)	76 (24)	71 (22)	59 (15)	49 (9)	42 (6)	57 (14)
Record low °F (°C)	20 (−7)	18 (−8)	30 (−1)	35 (2)	42 (6)	46 (8)	46 (8)	46 (8)	44 (7)	31 (−1)	7 (−14)	18 (−8)	7 (−14)
Source: AFCCC (extremes 1982, 1986, 1991-1998, 2006, 2010-2014)

== Demographics ==
Fort Irwin
- Census-designated place
- The location of Fort Irwin in San Bernardino County, California.
- Country: United States
- State: California
- County: San Bernardino
- Elevation: 2,464 ft (751 m)

Population (2020)
  - Total: 8,096
- Time zone: UTC-8 (Pacific)
  - Summer (DST): UTC-7 (PDT)
- ZIP Code: 92310
- Area codes: 442/760
- GNIS feature ID: 2628733

In 2010, the United States Census Bureau designated Fort Irwin as a separate census-designated place (CDP) for statistical purposes, covering the residential population. Per the 2020 census, the population was 8,096.

Historical population
Census	Pop.	Note	%±
2010	8,845		—
2020	8,096		−8.5%
U.S. Decennial Census; 1850–1870 1880–1890; 1900 1910 1920; 1930 1940 1950; 1960 1970 1980; 1990 2000 2010

=== 2020 census ===
Fort Irwin CDP, California – Racial and ethnic composition Note: the US Census treats Hispanic/Latino as an ethnic category. This table excludes Latinos from the racial categories and assigns them to a separate category. Hispanics/Latinos may be of any race.
Race / Ethnicity (NH = Non-Hispanic)	Pop 2010	Pop 2020	% 2010	% 2020
White alone (NH)	4,567	3,555	51.63%	43.91%
Black or African American alone (NH)	1,008	1,066	11.40%	13.17%
Native American or Alaska Native alone (NH)	67	90	0.76%	1.11%
Asian alone (NH)	379	508	4.28%	6.27%
Native Hawaiian or Pacific Islander alone (NH)	110	145	1.24%	1.79%
Other race alone (NH)	30	55	0.34%	0.68%
Mixed race or Multiracial (NH)	423	538	4.78%	6.65%
Hispanic or Latino (any race)	2,261	2,139	25.56%	26.42%
Total	8,845	8,096	100.00%	100.00%

The 2020 United States census reported that Fort Irwin had a population of 8,096. The population density was 1,162.4 inhabitants per square mile (448.8/km^{2}). The racial makeup of Fort Irwin was 52.2% White, 14.5% African American, 2.0% Native American, 6.5% Asian, 1.8% Pacific Islander, 8.8% from other races, and 14.1% from two or more races. Hispanic or Latino of any race were 26.4% of the population.

In 2020, 84.0% of the population lived in households and 16.0% lived in non-institutionalized group quarters.

There were 2,331 households, out of which 54.1% included children under the age of 18, 70.4% were married-couple households, 1.0% were cohabiting couple households, 8.6% had a female householder with no partner present, and 20.1% had a male householder with no partner present. 19.6% of households were one person, and 0.5% were one person aged 65 or older. The average household size was 2.92. There were 1,832 families (78.6% of all households).

The age distribution was 31.1% under the age of 18, 23.4% aged 18 to 24, 40.7% aged 25 to 44, 4.4% aged 45 to 64, and 0.4% who were 65 years of age or older. The median age was 24.0 years. For every 100 females, there were 132.8 males.
There were 2,462 housing units at an average density of 353.5 units per square mile (136.5 units/km^{2}), of which 2,331 (94.7%) were occupied. Of these, 1.2% were owner-occupied, and 98.8% were occupied by renters.

In 2023, the median household income was $66,964, and the per capita income was $28,872. About 10.0% of families and 11.6% of the population were below the poverty line.

== Infrastructure ==
=== Fort Irwin Solar Project ===
The Fort Irwin Solar Project, launched in 2009, will be the largest renewable energy project in the DoD's history. This plan is expected to result in more than 500 MW of renewable energy with one billion kilowatt-hours (kWh) of solar power generated per year by 2022.

== Points of interest ==
- The remains of the Epsom Salts Monorail are close by.

== Education ==
The CDP is in the Silver Valley Unified School District. It is the school district for families on-post.

Congressman Jerry Lewis Elementary School, Tiefort View Intermediate School, and Fort Irwin Middle School are on-post. The comprehensive high school is Silver Valley High School, located off-post.

== In popular culture ==
- Some scenes of the 1979 Miloš Forman musical war comedy drama Hair were filmed at Fort Irwin.
- Some action, including a critical dramatic scene of tank shooting, takes place at Fort Irwin in Lee Child's 2004 novel The Enemy.
- Parts of the 2021 Drama A Journal for Jordan were filmed at Fort Irwin.

== See also ==
- Joint Readiness Training Center (JRTC)
- Joint Multinational Readiness Center (JMRC)
