= Red Pass =

Gap in San Bernardino County, California

Coordinates: 35°19′31″N 116°17′01″W

Red Pass is a gap in the Avawatz Mountains, in San Bernardino County, California. Red Pass, lies between the Silurian Valley and the valley drained by an as yet unnamed tributary of Salt Creek, which drains much of the area of Fort Irwin National Training Center, through Red Pass into the Silurian Valley and into the Amargosa River in Death Valley.

== History ==
Red Pass was a pass for the Old Spanish Trail, where they passed through the Avawatz Mountains between the watering place at Salt Spring and Bitter Spring.

From 1847, the Old Spanish Trail became a wagon road, later called the Mormon Road pioneered by a party of Mormons led by Jefferson Hunt in 1847. From 1849 it became known by the Forty-Niners as the "Southern Route", of the California Trail, the winter route of the Forty-niners and later American immigrants to California. From 1855 after the route was modified and improvements made by the State of California and the Federal government, the winter trade route and freight wagon road between Utah and California, it was known as the Los Angeles - Salt Lake Road.
