= Dumont Hills =

- Location within California

Highest point
- Elevation: 1,844 ft (562 m)

Geography
- Country: United States
- State: California
- Region: Mojave Desert
- District: San Bernardino County
- Range coordinates: 35°42′30.896″N 116°7′18.066″W
- Topo map: USGS Valjean Hills

The Dumont Hills are a low mountain range in the Mojave Desert, in northeastern San Bernardino County, southern California.

The hills are just east of the southern section of the Amargosa River before it heads west into Death Valley. They are also east of southern Death Valley National Park.

== See also ==
Other ranges in the local area include the:

- Avawatz Mountains
- Saddle Peak Hills
- Salt Spring Hills
- Silurian Hills
- Sperry Hills
- Valjean Hills
