= Valjean Hills =

- Location within California Location within the United States

Highest point
- Elevation: 1,673 ft (510 m)

Geography
- Country: United States
- State: California
- Region: Mojave Desert
- District: San Bernardino County
- Range coordinates: 35°38′59.902″N 116°6′3.062″W
- Topo map: USGS Valjean Hills

The Valjean Hills are a low mountain range in the eastern Mojave Desert, in northern San Bernardino County, southern California.

They are located east of the Salt Spring Hills and southeastern Death Valley National Park, and west of Mount Charleston in the Spring Mountains.

== See also ==
Other ranges in the local area include the:

- Avawatz Mountains
- Saddle Peak Hills
- Salt Spring Hills
- Silurian Hills
- Sperry Hills
