= Shadow Mountains =

Mountain range in the Mojave Desert of eastern California

- Location within California

Highest point
- Elevation: 1,243 m (4,078 ft)

Geography
- Country: United States
- State: California
- Region: Mojave Desert
- District: San Bernardino County
- Range coordinates: 35°35′14″N 115°54′07″W
- Topo map: USGS Quad: Mesquite Lake

The Shadow Mountains are located in the Mojave Desert of eastern California in the United States. The mountains lie in a generally north–south direction south of the Kingston Range and east of the Avawatz Mountains and the Silurian Hills.

An isolated peak named Shadow Mountain is located about six miles due east of the main chain of the range. It has a peak elevation of 1,279 meters (4,196 ft). The Mojave National Preserve lies to the south and east.

The Eastern Star Mine is located at the western edge of the range, and the Kingston Spring is found in the northwestern part of the mountains. The Shadow Mountains lie to the north of the small community of Halloran Springs, next to Interstate 15.

== See also ==
Other ranges in the local area include the:

- Avawatz Mountains
- Salt Spring Hills
- Silurian Hills
- Sperry Hills
