= Silurian Valley =

Landform in San Bernardino County, California

Silurian Valley is a valley in the Mojave Desert, in San Bernardino County, California. The valley trends in a north–south direction, its mouth located just southeast of the south end of Death Valley at 35°37′17″N 116°16′07″W. Its head is at 35°23′36″N 116°08′02″W. The valley is drained by Salt Creek a tributary of the Amargosa River and contains Silurian Lake and Dry Sand Lake.

Silurian Valley is bounded on the northwest by the Salt Spring Hills; on the north by the Dumont Dunes and Dumont Hills; on the west by the Avawatz Mountains; on the northeast by the Kingston Range; on the east by the Valjean Valley and Silurian Hills and on the southeast and south by the Soda Mountains.
