= Saddle Peak Hills =

Mountain range in California

- Location within California Location within the United States

Highest point
- Elevation: 2,510 ft (770 m)

Geography
- Country: United States
- State: California
- Region: Mojave Desert
- District(s): Death Valley National Park, San Bernardino County
- Range coordinates: 35°44′29.881″N 116°20′22.090″W
- Topo map: USGS Saddle Peak Hills

The Saddle Peak Hills are a mountain range in the Mojave Desert, in northern San Bernardino County, southern California.

They are located within the southeastern corner of Death Valley National Park, northeast of the Avawatz Mountains.

== See also ==
Other ranges in the local area include the:

- Avawatz Mountains
- Dumont Hills
- Salt Spring Hills
- Silurian Hills
- Sperry Hills
- Valjean Hills
