= Salt spring (disambiguation) =

Salt spring is a saltwater spring.

Salt spring, Salt Spring or Salt Springs may refer to:

== Places ==
=== Canada ===
- Salt Spring Island, British Columbia; an island
- Salt Spring Island Electoral Area, British Columbia
- Salt Springs, Nova Scotia (disambiguation)

=== United States ===
- Salt Spring (Kern County), California; a watering place on the route of El Camino Viejo
- Salt Spring (San Bernardino County), California; a watering place on the Old Spanish Trail (trade route)
- Salt Spring Hills, San Bernardino County, California; a range of low mountains
- Salt Spring Valley Reservoir, Calaveras County, California; an artificial lake
- Salt Springs Reservoir, Alamador County and Calaveras County, California; an artificial lake
- Salt Springs, Florida; an unincorporated community
- Salt Springs Township, Greenwood County, Kansas
- Salt Springs, Missouri; an unincorporated community in Saline County
- Salt Springs Township, Randolph County, Missouri
- Salt Springs State Park, Pennsylvania
- Salt Springs, Syracuse, New York State; a neighborhood

== Other uses ==
- Salt Spring Air (ICAO airline code: 101), a floatplane airline

== See also ==
- Salt spring checkerbloom (Sidalcea neomexicana), a flowering mallow plant
- Little Salt Spring, North Point, Florida, USA
- Great Salt Spring, Illinois, USA
- Salt Spring dollar, a local currency for Saltspring Island, BC, Canada
- Spring (disambiguation)
- Salt (disambiguation)
