= Shadow Mountain =

Two mountain ranges in the Mojave Desert in California are called Shadow Mountains.

- Shadow Mountains is about the range or ridge in eastern San Bernardino County
- Shadow Mountains (western San Bernardino County) is the other.

Shadow Mountains or Shadow Mountain may also refer to:

- Shadow Mountain, an isolated peak in the Shadow Mountains
- Shadow Mountain Publishing, an imprint of Deseret Book Company
- Shadow Mountain Records, a division of Deseret Book Company
