= Bitter Spring Expedition =

1860 U.S. Army expedition

- Part of the American Indian Wars
Date	April to July, 1860
Location	Mojave Desert, San Bernardino County, California, Nevada
Result	United States victory

Belligerents
United States	Southern Paiute

Commanders and leaders
(United States) Newman S. Clarke (United States) James Henry Carleton	None

Strength
Company K of First Regiment of Dragoons	Unknown

Casualties and losses
0 killed, 2 wounded	5 killed, 1 wounded

The Bitter Spring Expedition of 1860 was a U. S. Army expedition from Fort Tejon, by Company K, First Regiment of Dragoons, led by Major James Henry Carleton, to punish suspected Southern Paiute raiders that had attacked travelers at Bitter Spring along the Los Angeles - Salt Lake Road, the winter trade route and wagon road between Utah and California.

The Bitter Spring Expedition was the result of two incidents earlier in the year, on along or near the Mohave River the other at Bitter Spring. First was the killing of a cattleman in January 1860, on the Mojave River, reportedly by Southern Paiutes. Two months later of two unarmed teamsters were killed at Bitter Spring by Native American men thought to be Paiute who had posed as friends before suddenly turning on them, feathering them with arrows.

In April 1860 Major James Henry Carleton was appointed commander of the Bitter Spring Expedition. Brevet General Newman S. Clarke, Carlton's superior, commanding the Department of California, in San Francisco, ordered him to "proceed to Bitter Springs and chastise the Indians you find in the vicinity." The General specifically instructed Carleton that "the punishment must fall on those dwelling nearest to the place of the murder or frequenting the water course in its vicinity." Carlton at the head of Company K, First Regiment of Dragoons left the fort in early April. However Carlton's attitude toward the Paiute had been soured by his investigation of the Mountain Meadows Massacre, which colored the subsequent treatment of the natives his command encountered on this campaign.

After arriving and establishing his base at Camp Cady Carlton sent out patrols looking for hostiles. On April 22, on Carlton's orders, the bodies of two Native American men, earlier slain by a detachment of Dragoons on the Mojave River at the Fish Ponds, were taken to Bitter Spring. At Camp Bitter Springs the site of the earlier attack on the cattleman and the teamsters, the bodies were hung from an improvised scaffold. A few days after a May 2 engagement at Old Dad Mountain, the heads cut off of the three natives killed there, were placed on display with those hung on the gibbet at Bitter Springs. On May 28, following reports of the display in the San Francisco press and after General Clarke had read Carlton's dispatch telling of the display of severed heads at Bitter Spring, Clarke ordered Carleton to cease mutilating the dead and remove all evidence of the mutilation from public gaze. The post remained at the spring to guard travelers on the road, until abandoned in late July 3, 1860 at the end of Carlton's expedition.
