= Mollhausen Mountains =

Coordinates: 35.1490°N 116.1580°W

The Mollhausen Mountains are in the Mojave Desert of California in the United States. The small range is found south of Interstate 15 southwest of the town of Baker. The mountains are at the northwestern edge of the Devils Playground and south of the Soda Mountains.
