= Bicycle Lake Army Airfield =

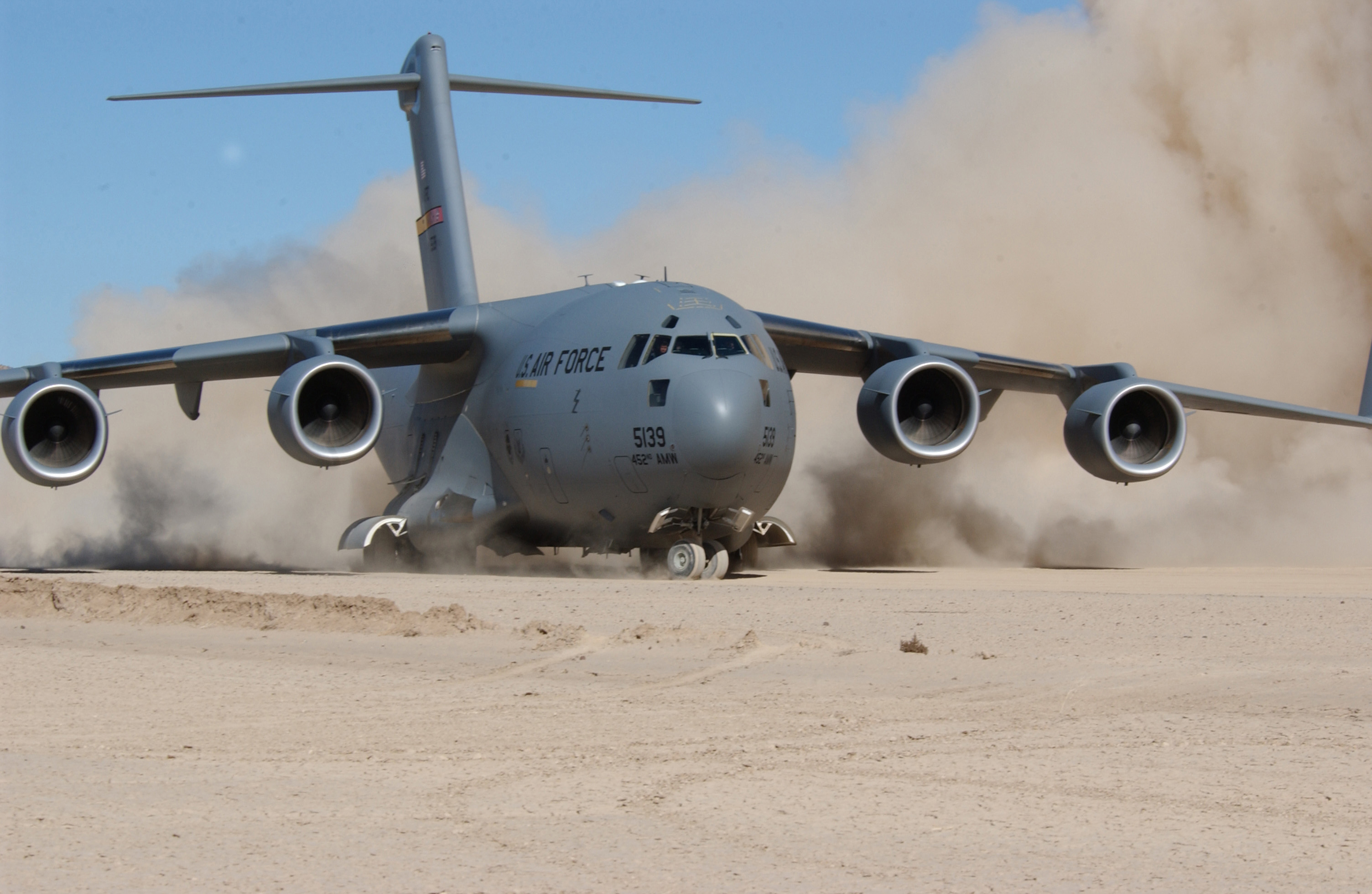
- The jet engines of an Air Force C-17 Globemaster III kick up clouds of dust as the aircraft turns around at the end of a dirt runway at Bicycle Lake Army Airfield on Fort Irwin, Calif., on Feb. 10, 2006. The Globemaster and her crew are attached to the 452nd Air Mobility Wing.
- IATA: BYS; ICAO: KBYS; FAA LID: BYS

Summary
- Airport type: Military
- Operator: United States Army
- Location: Fort Irwin, California
- Elevation AMSL: 2,350 ft (720 m)
- Coordinates: 35.2805303°N 116.6300294°W
- Interactive map of Bicycle Lake Army Airfield

Runways
Direction	Length		Surface
Direction	ft	m	Surface
4/22	9,500	2,896	Gravel
13/31	5,800	1,768	Gravel
- Sources: FAA

Bicycle Lake Army Airfield (IATA: BYS, ICAO: KBYS, FAA LID: BYS) is a military airport located on the Bicycle dry lake bed, three miles (5 km) northeast of the Fort Irwin cantonment area, in the Mojave Desert of San Bernardino County, California, United States. It is owned and operated by the United States Army.
