= Salt Springs, Nova Scotia =

Salt Springs, Nova Scotia could be one of the following communities :

- Salt Springs, Antigonish County
- Salt Springs, Cumberland County
- Salt Springs, Pictou County
- Salt Springs Station, Cumberland County

== See also ==
- Salt spring (disambiguation)
