= Lobber =

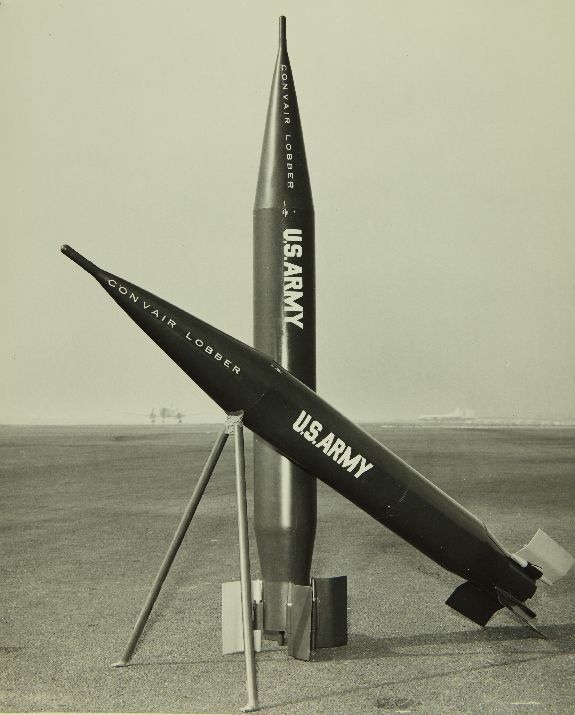
- Type: Cargo missile
- Place of origin: United States

Service history
- Used by: United States Army

Production history
- Designer: Convair
- Designed: 1958
- Unit cost: $1,000 (projected)
- No. built: 27

Specifications
- Mass: 135 lb (61 kg)
- Length: 9 ft (2.7 m)
- Diameter: 10 in (250 mm)
- Warhead: Cargo
- Warhead weight: 50 lb (23 kg)
- Engine: Rocket
- Propellant: Solid fuel
- Operational range: 8 mi (13 km)
- Flight ceiling: 10,000 ft (3,000 m)
- Maximum speed: 1,500 mph (2,400 km/h)
- Guidance system: Ballistic
- Accuracy: ~100 yd (91 m)

The Lobber was a surface-to-surface cargo missile developed during the mid 1950s by Convair for use by the United States Army. Intended to deliver supplies to troops in combat, it was successfully tested, but failed to go into production.

== History ==
Inspired by the use of artillery shells to resupply surrounded troops during the Battle of the Bulge, a contract for the development of a cargo missile was awarded to Convair in 1958 by the U.S. Army. Developed by a team led by Bill Chana, the missile was capable of delivering 50 pounds (23 kg) of cargo over a distance of approximately 8 miles (13 km); once the rocket motor burned out, a parachute was deployed to deliver the cargo. A portable, mortar-like launcher was used; it allowed for a three-man team to transport and fire the missile; Lobber was described as being able to reliably hit a target "within the length of a football field" and was expected to cost less than $1,000 USD per round. It was proposed that modular cargo sections be pre-packaged with supplies, with nose and tail sections attached to the needed section just before launch.

The first test launch took place in December 1958 at Camp Irwin in California. Flight testing proved highly successful, and Convair proposed variants with explosive, chemical, and nuclear warheads; the United States Marine Corps also considered adopting the missile, and it was also proposed to develop a variant for anti-submarine warfare usage by the United States Navy. Larger variants were also proposed, as well as civilian usage for firefighting. However the inherent inaccuracy of the unguided, solid-fueled rocket, combined with logistical issues, meant that Lobber was not adopted for service.
