= Salt Creek (Amargosa River tributary) =

Wash in California, United States

Salt Creek or Rio Salitroso is a tributary stream or wash of the Amargosa River, in San Bernardino County, California. It was named Rio Salitroso, on January 16, 1830, by Antonio Armijo, whose expedition subsequently followed it up towards the Mojave River, as they established the first route of the Old Spanish Trail.

The mouth of Salt Creek is at its confluence with the Amargosa River at an elevation of 390 feet (120 meters). Its source is at 35°16′37″N 116°10′50″W at an elevation of 890 feet (270 m) in the north slope of the Soda Mountains northwest of Baker, California. From there it flows down into Silurian Valley to Dry Sand Lake at 35°25′31″N 116°10′03″W and then to another named Silurian Lake, flowing northwest, gathering in Kingston Wash from the east, before flowing out of the valley through the Salt Spring Hills to the Amargosa River beyond in Death Valley.

Soda Lake may drain into the Dry Sand Lake in Salt Creek's upper reach through a wash from Silver Lake in extremely rare wet years when both lakes fill and overflow with water from rain or from the Mojave River.
