= Impassable Pass =

Gap in San Bernardino County, California

Coordinates: 35°07′28″N 116°35′11″W

Impassable Pass is a gap in Alvord Mountain, in San Bernardino County, California. It is located just south and outside of the boundary fence of Fort Irwin National Training Center.

== History ==
Impassable Pass was a pass through Alvord Mountain for the Old Spanish Trail and the later wagon route called the Mormon Road, between Bitter Spring and Fork of the Road, the next water on the Mojave River. The pass overlooks Spanish Canyon below it to the south, through which this route a passed through the south facing slope of Alvord Mountain to the open desert beyond its mouth.

== The site today ==
The site of Impassable Pass still exhibits deep ruts from the passing of the wagons of Mormons, the Forty-niners and later immigrants and the freight wagon trains that used the road from 1855. A large boulder installation exists at the top of the old roadway of the pass into Spanish Canyon, thwarting modern travelers from driving over the ruts, and a rock ring at the top of the pass may be the remains of Mormon signal fires.
