= Tiefort Mountains =

Mountain range in California, United States

Coordinates: 35°17′00″N 116°33′23″W

The Tiefort Mountains are located in the Mojave Desert in San Bernardino County, southeastern California in the United States.

The range is located at the southern end of the Fort Irwin Military Reservation, and is approximately 12 miles long. The highest point, Tiefort Peak, is 5,063 feet (1,543 m) high and is the 2,482nd highest mountain in California and the 24,629th highest mountain in the United States.

The mountains lie east of Fort Irwin and Bicycle Dry Lake, and are entirely within the military reservation, which is off-limit to the general public. The Tiefort mountains are about 16 miles north of Interstate 15, in the greater Barstow area.

The Tiefort Mountains are visible to the west, as is a small rivulet of water from Bitter Spring. The spring is protected from military maneuvers at Fort Irwin by an approximate half square mile barbed wire fence.
