= 916th Support Brigade =

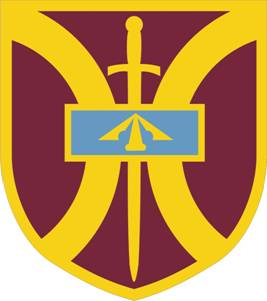
- Active: 1997 - present
- Country: United States
- Branch: United States Army
- Role: Support
- Size: Brigade
- Part of: Fort Irwin National Training Center
- Garrison/HQ: National Training Center, Fort Irwin, California
- Motto: Sustenio Coactum (Support The Force)
- Website: https://home.army.mil/irwin/units-tenants/916th-support-brigade

Commanders
- Current commander: COL Steven Magner
- Command Sergeant Major: CSM Norman Carey

Insignia
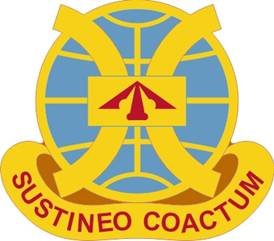
- 916th Support Brigade DUI

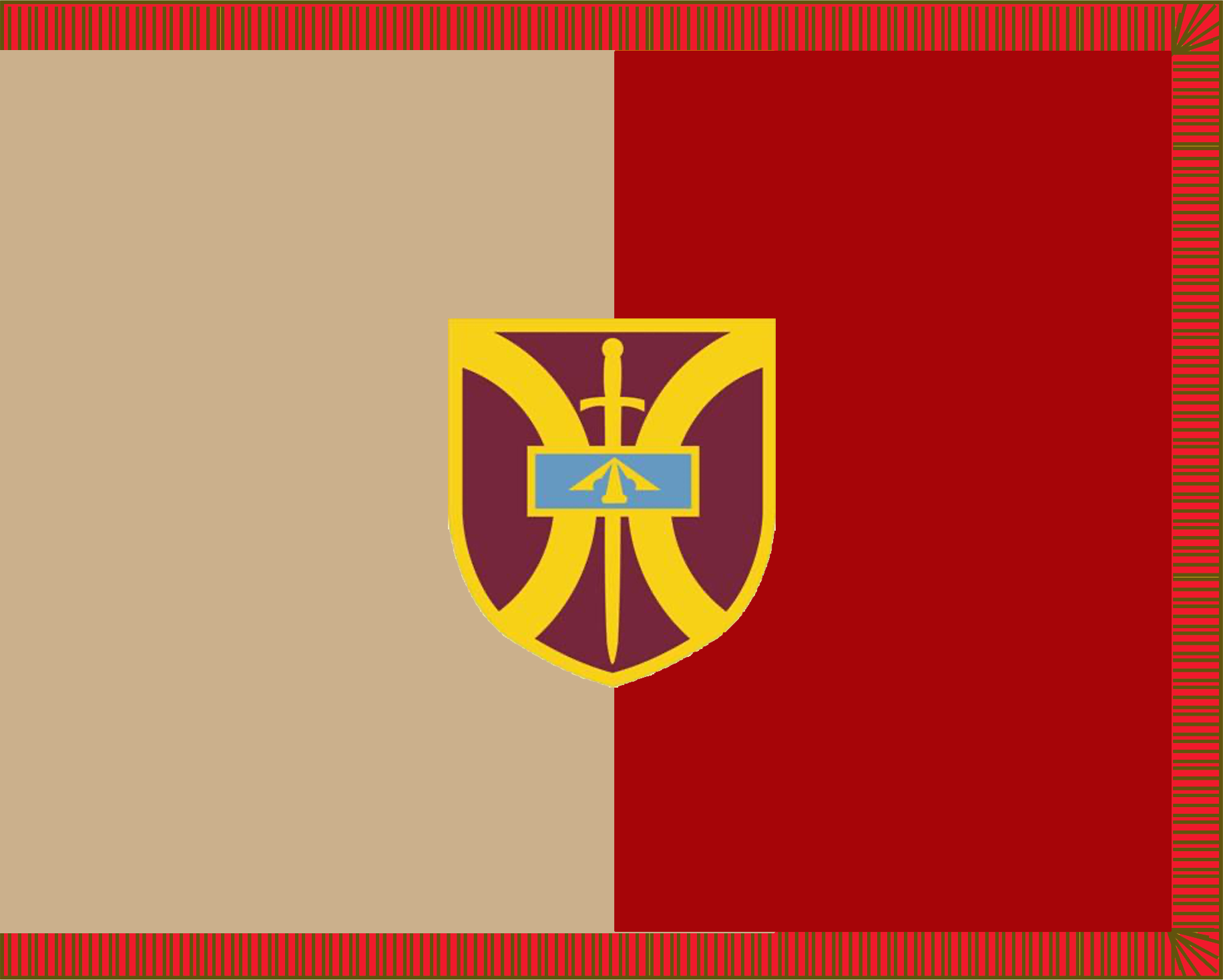
- 916th Support Brigade Flag

The 916th Support Brigade is a unit of the US Army at the National Training Center. The unit was originally activated in 1997 at the NTC Theater Support Command and became the 916 Support Brigade in 2009.

The mission of the 916 Support Brigade is to provide logistical support and aviation support for the National Training Center and the regular Army, Reserve and National Guard units rotating there. This includes feeding, arming, fueling and supplying up to 5,000 soldiers and their equipment including U.S. Forces Command prepositioned (PREPO) fleet equipment.

== Subordinate Units ==
- 1916th Support Battalion
- 2916th Aviation Battalion
