= Sperry Hills =

- Location within California Location within the United States

Highest point
- Elevation: 2,667 ft (813 m)

Geography
- Country: United States
- State: California
- Region: Mojave Desert
- District: San Bernardino County
- Range coordinates: 35°50′2.876″N 116°16′32.089″W
- Topo map: USGS Ibex Pass

The Sperry Hills are a low mountain range in the northern Mojave Desert—southern Amargosa Desert region, in northeastern San Bernardino County, southern California.

They are located south of Shoshone, east of Death Valley National Park, and west of the Dumont Hills.

== See also ==
Other ranges in the local area include the:

- Avawatz Mountains
- Dumont Hills
- Saddle Peak Hills
- Salt Spring Hills
- Silurian Hills
- Valjean Hills
