= James Henry Carleton =

American Civil War Union army general (1814–1873)

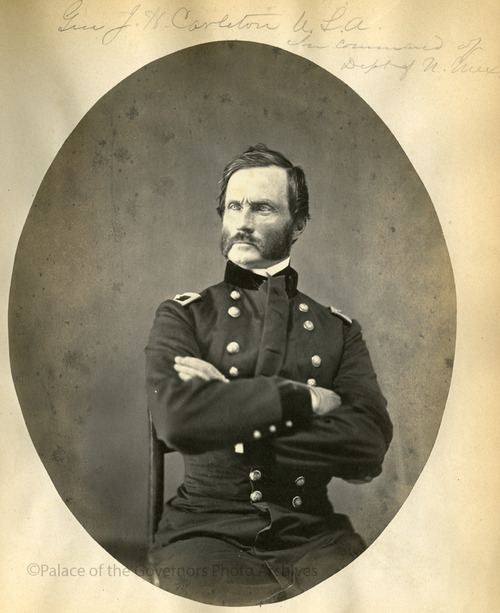
- Born: December 27, 1814; Lubec, Maine
- Died: January 7, 1873 (aged 58); San Antonio, Texas
- Burial place: Mount Auburn Cemetery, Cambridge, Massachusetts
- Military career
- Allegiance: United States; Union
- Branch: United States Army; Union Army
- Service years: 1839–1873
- Rank: Lieutenant Colonel; Brigadier General; Brevet Major General
- Unit: 1st U.S. Dragoons
- Commands: 1st California Infantry; District of Southern California; California Column; Department of New Mexico
- Conflicts: Aroostook War; Mexican–American War; Battle of Buena Vista; Bitter Spring Expedition; American Civil War; Battle of Picacho Pass; Capture of Tucson; American Indian Wars; Apache Wars; Battle of Apache Pass; Navajo Wars; Long Walk of the Navajo; Texas–Indian wars; Battle of Adobe Walls
- Other work: author

James Henry Carleton (December 27, 1814 – January 7, 1873) was an American military officer who served in the United States Army during the American Civil War and American Indian Wars. He became notorious for his involvement in the Long Walk of the Navajo, in which he led an ethnic cleansing campaign against the indigenous Navajo people.

== Early life and career ==
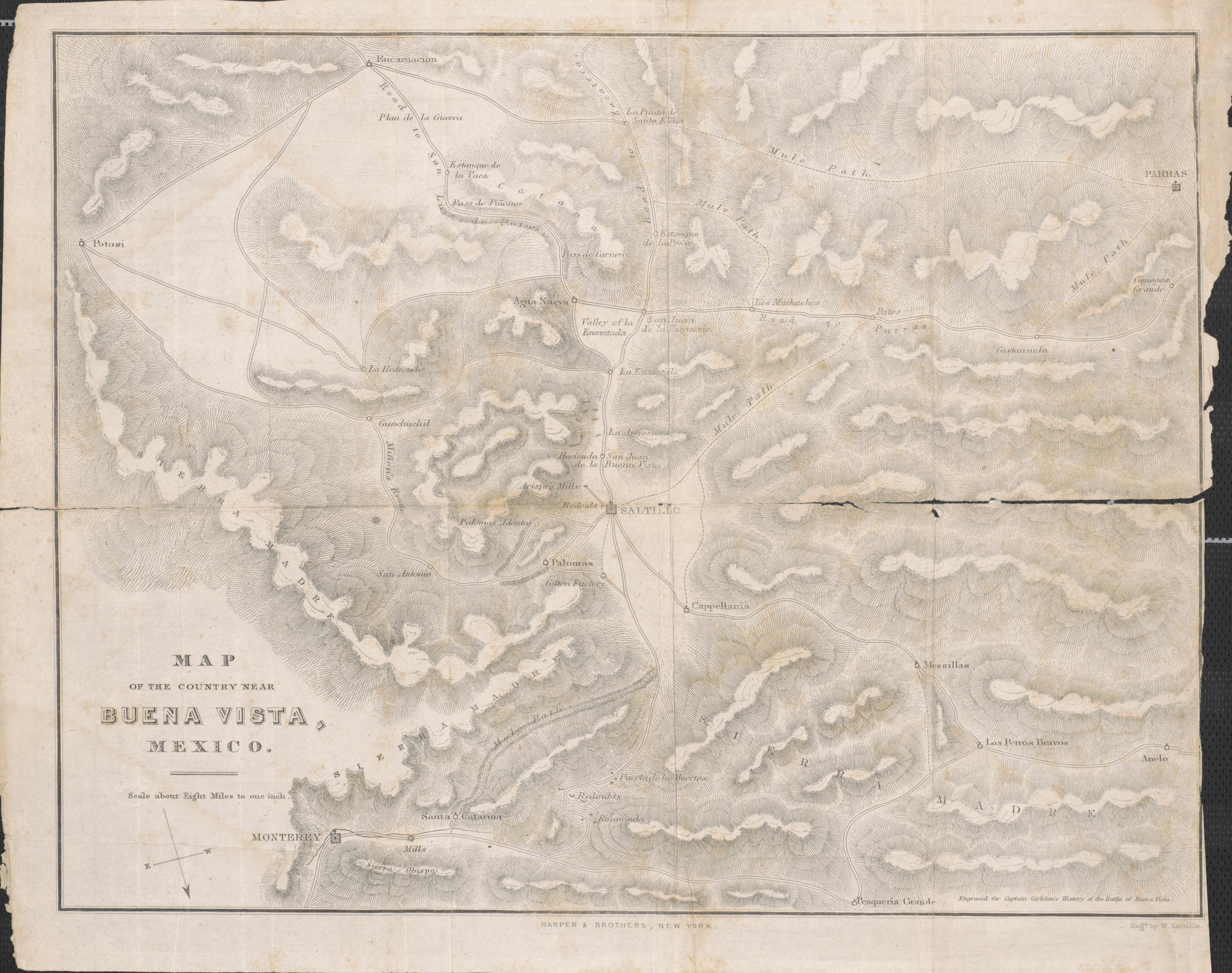
Carleton and William Kemble's Map of the country near Buena Vista, Mexico, 1847-48

Carleton was born in Lubec, Maine. He was commissioned as a lieutenant in the U.S. Army in 1839, during the Aroostook War, and took part in the Mexican–American War. He served in the 1st U.S. Dragoons in the American West, participating as a lieutenant in an 1844 expedition to the Pawnee and the Oto. One of Carleton's children, Henry Guy Carleton (1852–1910) was a journalist, playwright, and inventor.

== Mountain Meadows Massacre ==
In May 1859, Maj. Carleton and K Company of the 1st Dragoons out of Fort Tejon, California, were detailed to escort Maj. Henry Prince, a paymaster with government funds, to the Southern Utah Territory. Arriving at Mountain Meadows, the command rendezvoused with the Santa Clara Expedition of the Department of Utah from Camp Floyd under the command of Capt. Ruben Campbell. With orders from Gen. Newman S. Clarke, commander of the Department of California, to bury the victims of the September 1857 Mountain Meadows Massacre, the dragoons gathered and buried the remains of 34 in a mass grave. A crude monument was constructed of rocks, with a cedar cross and an engraved marker. Assistant Surgeon Charles Brewer of the Santa Clara Expedition was in charge of a burial detail that had interred the remains of 39 in three mass graves a few days before the arrival of K Company.

After investigating the incident, Carleton felt his findings were significant enough to deliver as a special report to Maj. W. W. Mackall, Assistant Adjutant-General, U.S.A., San Francisco, California. Carleton concluded that Mormons, some dressed as Indians, and assisted by Paiute tribesmen, had murdered and plundered the possessions of 120 men, women, and children of a California-bound emigrant train.

In 1860 Carleton, with a reinforced 1st Dragoons, Company K, led the Bitter Spring Expedition, which attacked and killed several suspected Paiute raiders along the Los Angeles – Salt Lake Road and Mojave Road.

== Civil War service ==
In 1861 Carleton raised and was appointed colonel of the 1st California Volunteer Infantry Regiment. In October 1861, Col. Carleton replaced Brigadier Gen. George Wright as commander of the District of Southern California. In 1862 he commanded the so-called California Column during its advance across California, Arizona, New Mexico, and into Texas.

Carleton was promoted to brigadier general of volunteers on April 28, during the march from California to Arizona. Along the way the Californians fought the Battle of Picacho Pass and captured Tucson in Arizona. Then marched east engaging the Apache for the first time at the Battle of Apache Pass. As a result, he established Fort Bowie near Apache Pass to guard this critical place on the road between the Colorado and Rio Grande Rivers.

The advance force of the California Column reached the Rio Grande at abandoned Fort Thorn, New Mexico on July 4, finally linking up with Union forces under Gen. Edward R. S. Canby. Carleton's troops were delayed two weeks by a huge flood of the river that year, eventually crossed at San Diego Crossing and with followed after the rearguard of Sibley's Confederate army through El Paso as far as Fort Davis, seizing control of southern New Mexico of most of West Texas.

After the Confederate threat to New Mexico seemed eliminated, Canby and many of the Union forces were sent to the east and in late August, Carleton was placed in command of the Department of New Mexico. Although a strict disciplinarian, he remained popular with his men. Uncertain whether the Confederates would re-invade, Carleton took measures such as maintaining spies along the New Mexico–Texas border and retaining the services of volunteer units from Colorado which had played a prominent role in expelling the Confederates from New Mexico in winter and spring 1862. In fall 1862 Carleton also decreed several security measures including internal passports, curfews, and martial law.

== Indian Wars ==
=== War against the Mescalero Apache ===
While New Mexico department commander, Carleton concentrated on the threat posed by Apache and Navajo raiders. His first campaign was against the Mescalero Apache led by Mangas Coloradas. It was led by Christopher "Kit" Carson, leading New Mexican militia and California Volunteers. In October 1862, Carleton established Fort Sumner to house captured Mescalero Apache, despite warnings of its unsuitability for a large human presence.

One notorious quote by Carleton on the Mescalero Apache:

All Indian men of that tribe are to be killed whenever and wherever you can find them. … If the Indians send in a flag of truce say to the bearer ... that you have been sent to punish them for their treachery and their crimes. That you have no power to make peace, that you are there to kill them wherever you can find them.

This policy was followed, even to those under a flag of truce. In January 1863, Mangas Coloradas agreed to meet with U.S. military leaders at Fort McLane, near present-day Hurley in southwestern New Mexico. Mangas Coloradas arrived under a white flag of truce to meet with Colonel Joseph Rodman West, an officer of the California Volunteers. Armed soldiers took him into custody, and West is reported to have ordered the sentries to execute the Apache leader. That night Mangas Coloradas was tortured with heated bayonets, shot and killed, as he was "trying to escape." The following day, soldiers cut off his head, boiled it and sent the skull to the Smithsonian Institution. The mutilation of Coloradas' body increased the hostility of the Apache toward the United States.

=== Navajo Campaign ===
Next Carleton concentrated on the Navajo. Against the "great evil" of Navajo raiders he began scorched earth tactics, stating they "must be whipped and fear us before they will cease killing and robbing the people." His campaign against the Navajos was relentless, with his primary field commander being Col. Carson. After the Navajo surrender at Canyon de Chelly, the entire nation was forced on the Long Walk to Fort Sumner. Carleton found "severity would be the most humane course" and felt expropriating the Navajo was in their best interests. After the journey 2,000 Navajos remained unaccounted for, with official records stating 336 died along the way.

Carleton used Fort Sumner, which already held many Mescalero Apaches, to house the Navajos, despite warnings of its unsuitability for such a large human presence.

=== War with the Comanche and Kiowa ===
Carleton next sent Carson on an expedition to rid the southwest of raids by Comanche and their Kiowa allies, which resulted in the Battle of Adobe Walls.

== Later life, literary efforts and death ==
Near the end of the Civil War in 1865, Carleton was breveted major general in the regular army. He retained command of his volunteer troops until 1866 when U.S. Regulars took over in the West. After the war, Carleton became a companion of the New York Commandery of the Military Order of the Loyal Legion of the United States. After his discharge from the Volunteer Army, Carleton was promoted to lieutenant colonel of the 4th U.S. Cavalry in July 1866.

Carleton wrote several books on the military: The Battle of Buena Vista (1848), Diary of an Excursion to the Ruins of Abo, Quarra, and the Grand Quivira in New Mexico in 1853 (1855) and The Prairie Log Books (posthumous, 1944). Partly on the strength of The Battle of Buena Vista Carleton received an appointment from Secretary of War Jefferson Davis in 1856 to make a study of European cavalry tactics. Carleton did not make the trip abroad himself, but based his report on the observations of Capt. George B. McClellan, recently returned from Europe.

Carleton died January 7, 1873, aged 59, in San Antonio, Texas, serving with the 4th Cavalry Regiment in his permanent rank of lieutenant colonel. He was buried in Mount Auburn Cemetery, Cambridge, Massachusetts; his son Henry was later buried beside him.

== See also ==
- List of American Civil War generals (Union)

== Sources ==
- Eicher, John H., & Eicher, David J., Civil War High Commands, Stanford University Press, 2001, ISBN 0-8047-3641-3.
- Hunt, Aurora, James H. Carleton, 1814–1873, Western Frontier Dragoon, Frontier Military Series II, Glendale, California: The Arthur H. Clark Company, 1958.
- Pettis, George Henry, The California column. Its campaigns and services in New Mexico, Arizona and Texas, during the Civil War, with sketches of Brigadier General James H. Carleton, its commander, and other officers and soldiers, Santa Fe: New Mexican Printing Co., 1908

== Research resources ==
- James Henry Carleton Papers : typescript transcripts of letters and reports, 1851-1865 (1 binder) are housed in the Department of Special Collections and University Archives at Stanford University Libraries
