= Bicycle Lake =

Lake in the state of California, United States

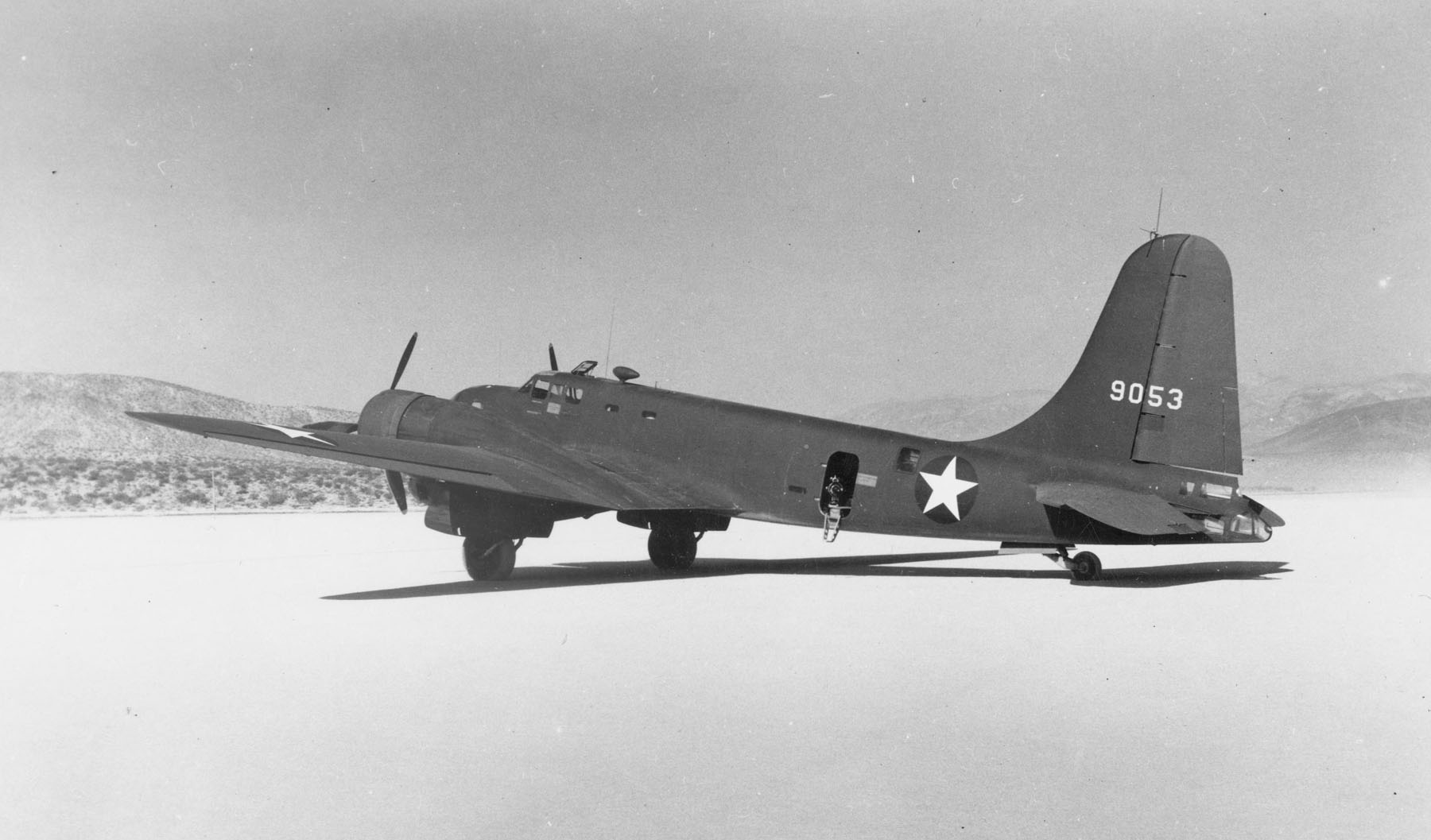
- Douglas RB-23 of the USAAF photographed at Bicycle Lake (assigned to Muroc Lake Army Air Base

- Location within California Location within the United States
- Location: Fort Irwin Military Reservation, Mojave Desert; San Bernardino County, California
- Coordinates: 35°16′48″N 116°37′42″W
- Lake type: Endorheic basin
- Primary outflows: Terminal
- Basin countries: United States
- Max. length: 4 km (2.5 mi)
- Max. width: 3 km (1.9 mi)
- Shore length^{1}: 12 km (7.5 mi)
- Surface elevation: 711 m (2,333 ft)
- ^{1} Shore length is not a well-defined measure.

Bicycle Lake is a dry lake in the Mojave Desert of San Bernardino County, California, 60 km (37 mi) northeast of Barstow. The lake is approximately 4 km (2.5 mi) long and 3 km (1.9 mi) at its widest point.

Bicycle Lake is on federal lands and contains the Bicycle Lake Army Airfield.

== See also ==
- List of lakes in California
