= Old Dad Mountain =

Mountain in California, United States

- Location within California Location within the United States

Highest point
- Elevation: 4,254 ft (1,297 m) NAVD 88
- Prominence: 1,218 ft (371 m)
- Parent peak: Kelso Peak
- Listing: Sierra Club Desert Peaks Section
- Coordinates: 35°06′04″N 115°51′41″W

Geography
- Location: Mojave National Preserve, San Bernardino County, California, U.S.
- Topo map: USGS Old Dad Mountain

Climbing
- Easiest route: Class 2 climb

Old Dad Mountain is a summit, southwest of the Cinder Cone Lava Beds, west of the Kelso Mountains, north of Jackass Canyon, northeast of the Devils Playground and east of Soda Lake, in San Bernardino County, California. Old Dad Mountain was named in humorous contrast to the nearby Old Woman Mountains. It is geographically separate from the Old Dad Mountains to the south.
