= Devils Playground =

Sandy region in the Mojave Desert

Coordinates: 34°56′54.95″N 115°49′36.01″W

The Devils Playground is a large sandy region in the Mojave Desert in the state of California in the United States. Dunes and salt flats stretch for approximately 40 miles (64 km) in a generally northwest-southeasterly direction in the Mojave National Preserve. The Cronese Mountains are located at its northwestern edge. The "playground" lies between the town of Baker and the Providence Mountains.

The Devils Playground consists mostly of relatively flat plains except for some hills and small mountains at the northern end, where it merges with several dry lake beds, and the Kelso Dunes near the southern end of the area.

The Rasor Off-Highway Vehicle Area lies at the northwestern edge of the Devils Playground in the Mojave River Wash, near the Mollhausen Mountains.
