= Cronese Mountains =

Small mountain range in the Mojave Desert

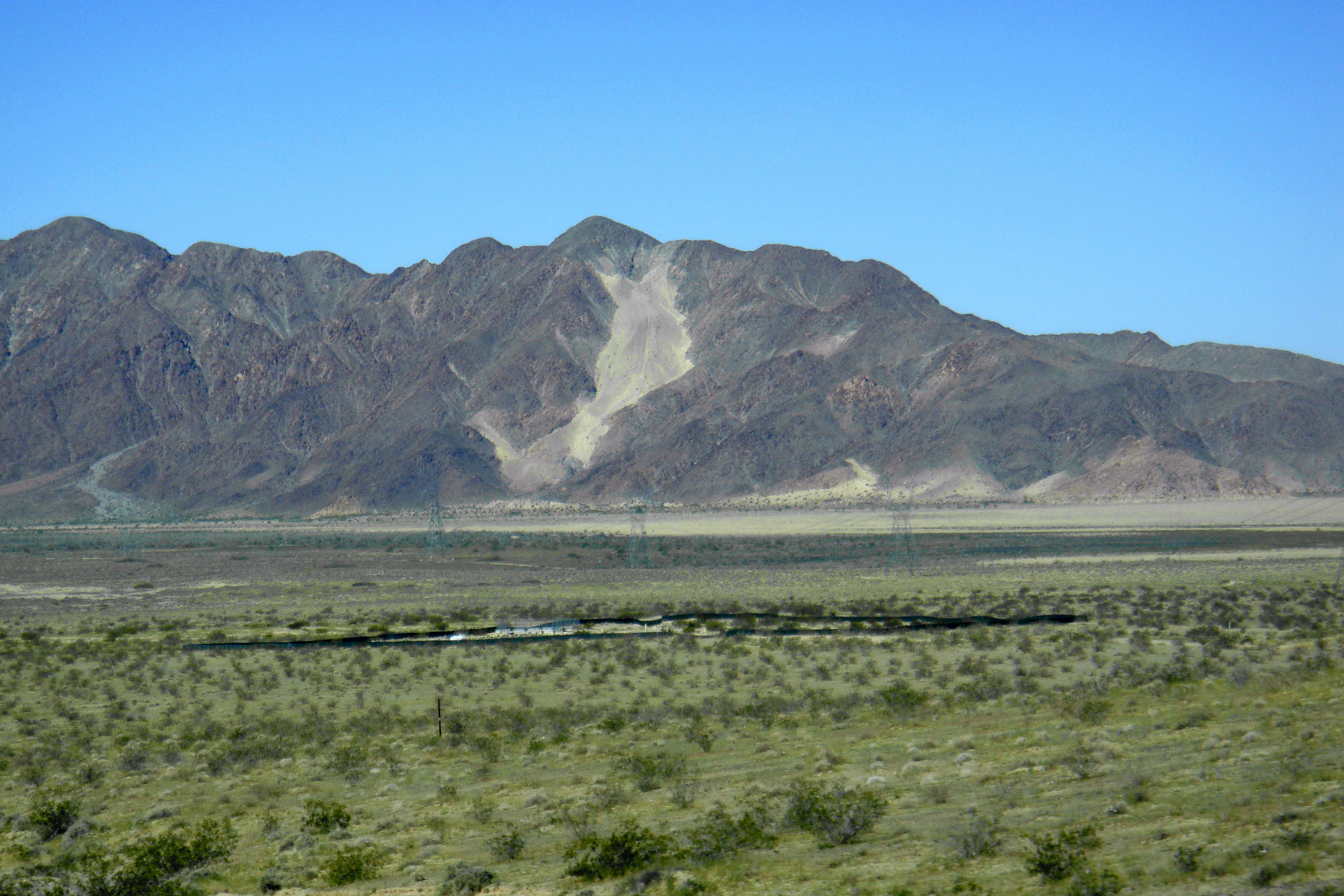
- Cat Dune sand ramp, Cronese Mountains, California.

Geography
- Location within California
- Country: United States
- State: California
- District(s): Mojave Desert, San Bernardino County, California
- Range coordinates: 35.11°N 116.32°W
- Topo map: USGS

The Cronese Mountains are found in the Mojave Desert of San Bernardino County, California in the United States.

== Geography ==
The small range is found north of Interstate 15, southwest of the town of Baker. The mountains are located at the northwestern edge of the Devils Playground and Mojave National Preserve.

Located at 35.11°N 116.32°W, they are southwest of the Soda Mountains. The eastern part of the range lies between East and West Cronese Dry Lakes, and the Arrowhead Trail (Arrowhead Highway) runs along the range near the freeway.

Its name may derive from that of Titus F. Cronise, author of The Natural Wealth of California and a pioneer.
