= Shadow Mountains (western San Bernardino County) =

Mountain range in California, US

- Location within California

Highest point
- Elevation: 1,251 m (4,104 ft)

Dimensions
- Length: 10 mi (16 km) north-south
- Width: 6 mi (9.7 km) east-west

Geography
- Country: United States
- State: California
- District: San Bernardino County
- Range coordinates: 34°40′0″N 117°31′0″W
- Topo map(s): USGS Shadow Mountains, Astley Rancho, Victorville NW, Red Buttes, Adelanto, Shadow Mountains SE

The Shadow Mountains are a mountain range in western San Bernardino County, California, United States. The southeastern edge of the range is 4 miles northwest of Adelanto and 6 miles west of the Mojave River; the northern part of the range is 14 miles north northwest of Adelanto. Although they provide a name for and are prominent in the Shadow Mountains quadrangle map, they are not labelled on it. They are mentioned on USGS 7.5 topographic map Victorville NW.

The highest peak, at 4120 feet above sea level, is Shadow Mountain; there is a radio tower on top of it, and it is private property. Silver Peak, 1.37 miles to the east, is 4041 feet. Both peaks give good views of the desert and Edwards Air Force base. Part of the mountains in the south are in the El Mirage Off-Highway Vehicle area, administered by the Bureau of Land Management.

== Geology ==
The mountains are composed of Pre-Cretaceous metasedimentary rocks in the northeast and southeast; granite and adamellite in the center. There is some undivided Carboniferous marine rocks in the extreme southeast part of the mountains, and Pleistocene nonmarine in the extreme north. Mineral resources include fluorite and tungsten.

== Flora ==
Plants include Krascheninnikovia lanata (winter fat) and Phacelia fremontii Fremont's phacelia.

== Film Appearance ==
The Lionsgate feature "The Fall"(2022) used the high point to film the scenes set at the top of the tower. A temporary tower structure was erected and the film crew used the abandoned radio tower building for staging the production.
