= Spanish Canyon =

Landform in San Bernardino County, California

Spanish Canyon, is a canyon that has its head near the middle of the southwest slope of Alvord Mountain below Impassable Pass at 35°07′10″N 116°35′37″W and trends south to its mouth, 1.6 miles east northeast of Alvord Well at an elevation of 2,188 feet/667 meters. The canyon is named for the Old Spanish Trail which passed through the canyon.

== History ==
Spanish Canyon was first traveled by the New Mexican caravans of the Old Spanish Trail between Bitter Spring and the Mojave River part of one of the three routes that came to be called the Old Spanish Trail. It was later traveled by wagons of Mormons and Forty-niners who established the wagon road between Salt Lake City and Los Angeles, called the Mormon Road between 1847 and 1849. By 1855 it became part of the route of the freight wagon road between Los Angeles and Salt Lake City.
