= Alvord Mountain =

Landform in San Bernardino County, California

- Location within California

Highest point
- Elevation: 1,052 m (3,451 ft)

Geography
- Country: United States
- State: California
- District: San Bernardino County
- Range coordinates: 35°5′50.930″N 116°37′9.105″W
- Topo map: USGS Alvord Mountain East

Alvord Mountain is a mountain range in San Bernardino County, California. The mountain was named after Charles Alvord, who prospected in the area of the mountain between 1860 and 1862. It is located 17.5 miles northeast of Yermo, California.

== History ==
The Old Spanish Trail crossed Alvord Mountain at Impassable Pass, at the head of Spanish Canyon on its route between Bitter Spring and the Mojave River.
