= Salt Springs Station =

Community in Canada

Coordinates: 45°41′21.39″N 64°0′6.78″W

Salt Springs Station in Nova Scotia

Salt Springs Station is a small community in the Canadian province of Nova Scotia, located near Amherst.
