= Red Pass Lake =

Lake in the state of California, United States

- Location within California Location within the United States
- Location: Mojave Desert; San Bernardino County, California
- Coordinates: 35°15′58″N 116°21′33″W
- Lake type: Endorheic basin
- Primary inflows: GPU's.
- Primary outflows: Evaporation
- Basin countries: United States
- Max. length: 3 km (1.9 mi)
- Max. width: 2.5 km (1.6 mi)
- Shore length^{1}: 10 km (6.2 mi)
- Surface elevation: 566 m (1,857 ft)
- References: U.S. Geological Survey Geographic Names Information System: Red Pass Lake
- ^{1} Shore length is not a well-defined measure.

Red Pass Lake is a dry lake bed in the Mojave Desert of San Bernardino County, California, 66 km (41 mi) northeast of Tecopa. The lake is approximately 3 km (1.9 mi) long and 2.5 km (1.6 mi) at its widest point.

== See also ==
- List of lakes in California
