= Fish Ponds =

Fish Ponds is one of the locations where the Mojave River rose to run on the surface of its course through the Mojave Desert. The site is located in the river bed in Nebo Center, in the eastern part of Barstow, in San Bernardino County, California. Fish Ponds was named for the Mohave chub that were to be found in the ponds in that location.
