= Newman S. Clarke =

Newman Strong Clarke (1793 – October 17, 1860) was a career military officer in the United States Army who served with distinction during the Mexican–American War of 1846–1848.

== Early career ==
Clarke was born in Connecticut and was commissioned into the U.S. Army on March 12, 1812, right before the outbreak of the War of 1812 (1812–1815). During the war, Clarke received a brevet promotion for his gallantry at the Battle of Niagara. By the end of the war, he had been promoted three times to captain.

== Mexican-American War ==
Clarke became colonel of the 6th U.S. Infantry right after the start of the Mexican–American War. He commanded a brigade of regulars in General William J. Worth's division during the siege of Veracruz, port city on the Gulf of Mexico of the eastern coast of Mexico, being one of the first brigades to wade ashore in one of the first amphibious landings in American military history. For his services at Veracruz, he was awarded with another brevet promotion to brigadier general. He continued leading his brigade westward into the interior of Mexico at the battles of Cerro Gordo and Churubusco, on the road to the capital of Mexico City, where he was wounded. Clarke took a brief leave of absence and command of the brigade was transferred to Lieutenant Colonel James S. McIntosh. He was therefore not present at the bloody Battle of Molino del Rey in which McIntosh was killed at the head of the brigade. Clarke returned to command in time for the assaults on Chapultepec and pivotal Battle of Mexico City.

== Later career ==
In 1857, Clarke replaced Brigadier General John E. Wool in command of the Department of the Pacific (which then encompassed the entire newly acquired western coast along the Pacific Ocean). Clarke inherited the task of dealing with the ongoing Yakima War (1855–1858) against the Yakama. Responding to recent attacks in the southern part of the new Washington Territory, Clarke sent out a force of 600 troops under the command of Colonel George Wright, who had served with Clarke earlier in Mexico. He also closed the territory to settlement. Wright defeated the Yakama at the Battle of Four Lakes, but continued to keep white settlers out. On September 13, 1858, Clarke took command of the Department of California, one of the two military departments created to split and replace the Department of the Pacific, while command of the new Department of Oregon was turned over to Brigadier General William S. Harney.

Clarke died a year later on October 17, 1860, while headquartered in San Francisco, California.

== Dates of rank ==
=== United States Army ===
Date	Insignia	Rank	Brevet Promotions
March 12, 1812		Ensign	
March 12, 1813		Second lieutenant	
August 15, 1813		First lieutenant	Bvt. Captain (1814) (Note: July 25, 1814, for gallantry and good conduct at the Battle of Niagara.)
October 1, 1814		Captain	Bvt. Major (1824) (Note: July 25, 1824, for faithful service of ten years in one grade.)
July 21, 1834		Major	
July 7, 1838		Lieutenant colonel	
June 28, 1846		Colonel	Bvt. Brigadier general (1847) (Note: March 29, 1847, for gallantry and meritorious conduct at the Siege of Veracruz.)
October 17, 1860	Died while in service.		
