= Silurian Hills =

Range of hills in the Mojave Desert, southern California

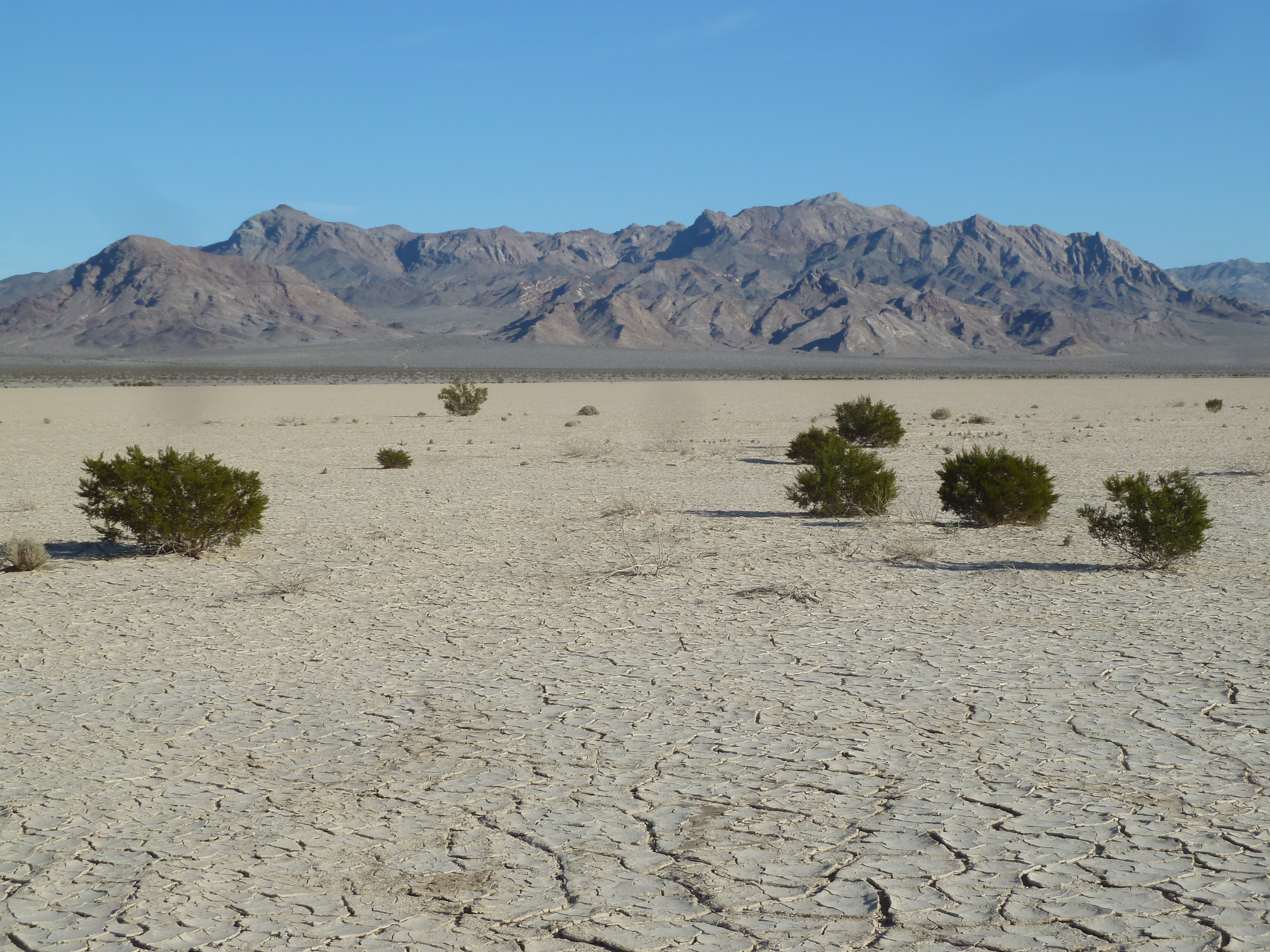
- View of Silurian Hills beyond Silurian Dry Lake, and the occasional creosote bush.

Highest point
- Elevation: 1,056 ft (322 m)

Geography
- Location within California Location within the United States
- Country: United States
- State: California
- Region: Mojave Desert
- District: San Bernardino County
- Range coordinates: 35°31′59.912″N 116°7′38.059″W
- Topo map: USGS Silurian Lake

The Silurian Hills are a small range of hills in the Mojave Desert, southeast of Death Valley National Park, in southern California. The surrounding lower elevation lands provide important connectivity habitat between nearby mountain ranges. The area provides critical habitat and movement corridors for bighorn sheep, desert tortoises, nesting golden eagles, kit foxes and burrowing owls. The Silurian Valley is a largely undisturbed valley that supports wildlife and is an important link for this portion of the northern Mojave Desert.

== Geography ==
The range lies in a northwest-southeasterly direction, and is about 9 miles (14 km) long. The Shadow Mountains lies to the east, and the Avawatz Mountains, on the west, across the Silurian Valley. Salt Creek flows intermittently through the 19-mile-long (30 km) Silurian Valley connecting Silver Lake to the south with Death Valley to the north. Other nearby ranges are Salt Spring Hills and Sperry Hills.

== Sites of interest ==
Highway 127, traversing through the Silurian Valley in a northwest-southeasterly direction, connects three protected areas: Joshua Tree National Park, the Mojave National Preserve and Death Valley National Park. This portion of highway 127 has been described as one of the most scenic in the state. The small community of Halloran Springs near Interstate 15 lies about 12 miles (19 km) to the southeast.

The Old Spanish Trail developed several variations to take advantage of better water sources and to shorten the length and time of travel. The Kingston Cutoff went southwest from Mountain Springs, Nevada, to Silurian Lake.
