= Salt Spring (San Bernardino County) =

Spring in the Mojave Desert in California

Coordinates: 35°38′25″N 116°17′26″W

Salt Spring, sometimes called Salt Springs, was a spring in the Mojave Desert, in San Bernardino County, California. It was a spring along the course of Salt Creek a tributary of the Amargosa River.

== History ==
Salt Spring was a water source for the native people of the surrounding desert. From 1829 it was a water hole and stopping place established by Antonio Armijo on the Old Spanish Trail between Nuevo Mexico and Alta California. In 1849 the spring became a stop for wagons traveling along the Mormon Road between Salt Lake City and Los Angeles. The first party of wagons to visit the springs on their way to California found gold in the hills to the east, which became known as the Salt Spring Hills and the mining settlement later established was called Salt Spring.

Today the location of Salt Spring, once on Salt Creek, is now buried by debris brought down Salt Creek by flooding in the early 20th century that changed the course of the creek, but it was located about 0.5 miles north of the intersection of California State Route 127 and Saratoga Springs Road.
