= Salt Spring Hills =

Landform in San Bernardino County, California

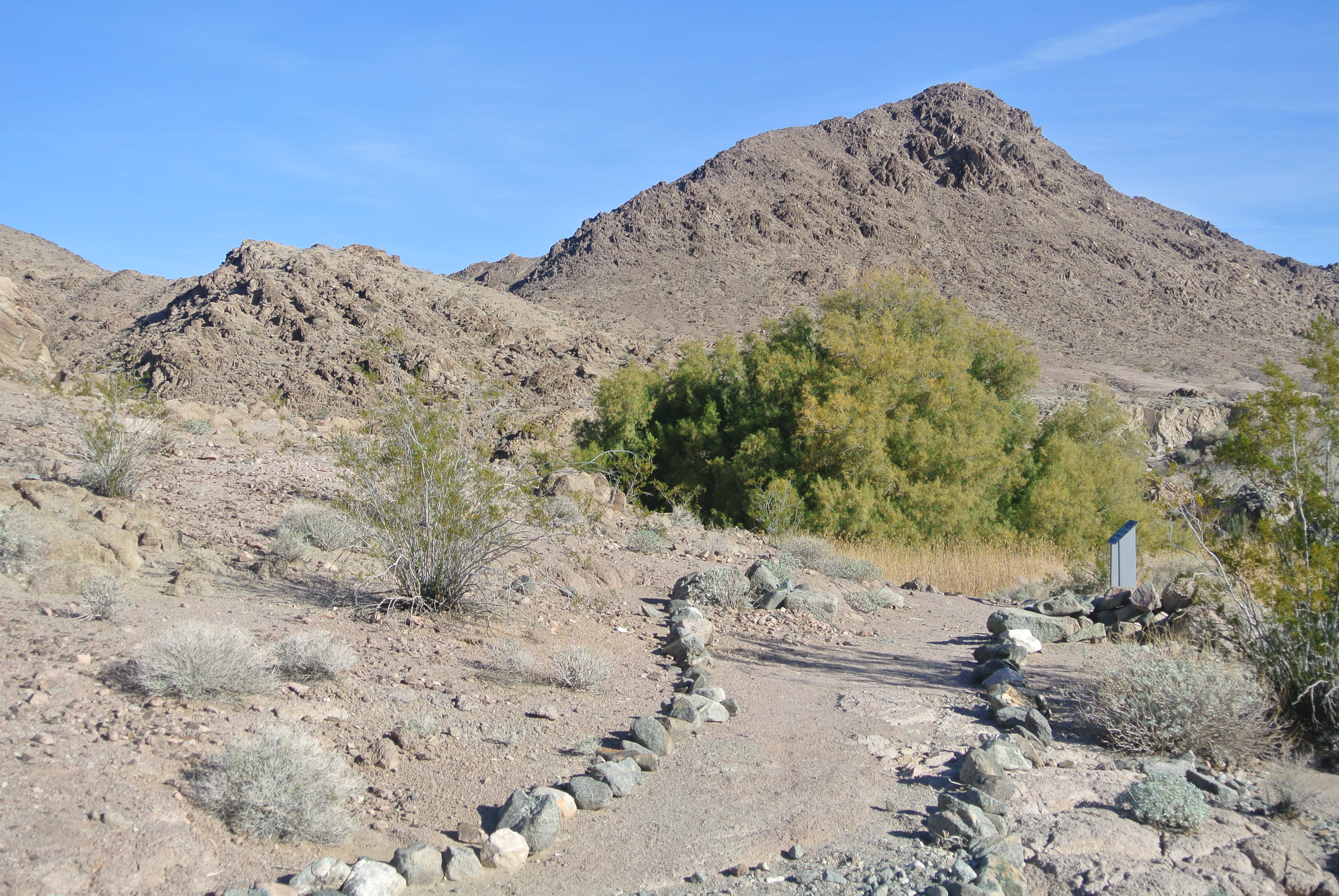
- Salt Spring Hills, San Bernardino County, California.

Highest point
- Elevation: 928 ft (283 m)

Geography
- Location within California Location within the United States
- Country: United States
- State: California
- Region: Mojave Desert
- District: San Bernardino County
- Range coordinates: 35°38′37.895″N 116°16′18.079″W
- Topo map: USGS Saddle Peak Hills

The Salt Spring Hills are a low mountain range in the Mojave Desert, in northern San Bernardino County, California. They are just outside the southeastern corner of Death Valley National Park, southeast of the Saddle Peak Hills. The road between Shoshone and Baker passes through the hills.

== History ==
From 1831 to 1848, the Old Spanish Trail passed from Salt Spring on Salt Creek east of the Salt Spring Hills near its confluence with the Amargosa River through the hills near Amargosa Spring.

In 1849, when Jefferson Hunt led a Mormon party of several wagons along the Old Spanish Trail to Los Angeles, they camped at Salt Spring east of the Salt Spring Hills. Some of the party discovered gold in the creek and traced it to a quartz vein in the nearby hills near Amargosa Spring. The Salt Spring Hills were named for Salt Spring, on the Mormon Road that passed just west of the hills, where the gold was first found. This discovery which became known once the party reached the Rancho Santa Ana del Chino, set off the first gold rush in the Mojave Desert. Several mining companies attempted to mine in the hills from the early 1850s.

Mrs. Rousseau and her doctor husband traveled the Mohave Desert in the final months of 1864 with a wagon train from Utah bound for San Bernardino. That train passed the Salt Spring Hills, where Mrs. Rousseau mentioned in her diary, dated December 4, that there were four houses and a quartz mill there, and that three men who had been serving as caretakers for a mine located there had been killed by Indians eight weeks earlier.

== See also ==
Other ranges in the local area include the:

- Avawatz Mountains
- Saddle Peak Hills
- Silurian Hills
- Sperry Hills
