= Soda Mountains =

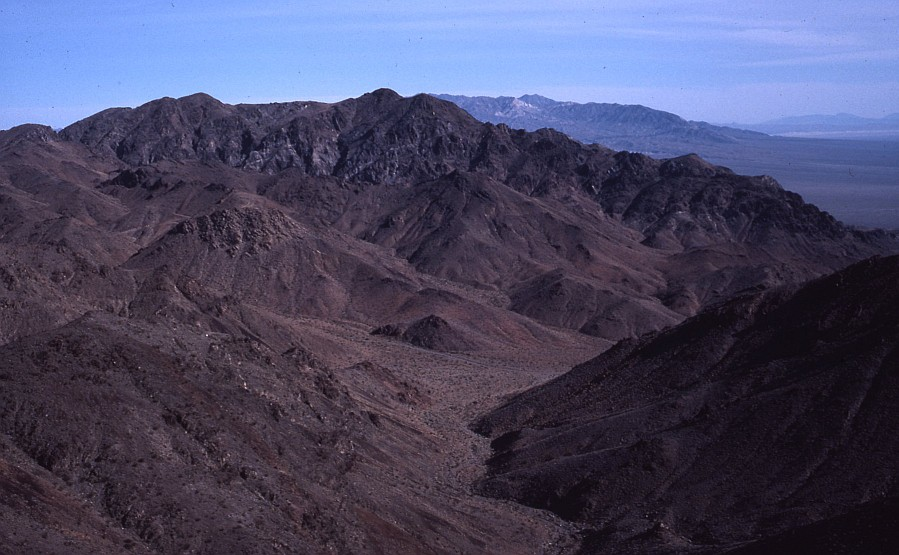
- Northern Soda Mountains

Highest point
- Elevation: 3,615 ft (1,102 m)

Geography
- Location within California
- Country: United States
- State: California
- District: San Bernardino County
- Range coordinates: 35°12′59.930″N 116°14′3.066″W
- Topo map: USGS West of Soda Lake

The Soda Mountains are located in the eastern Mojave Desert in San Bernardino County, California, USA. The range lies to the north of Interstate 15 west of the town of Baker.

== Geography ==
The range reaches an elevation of 3,615 feet (1,102 m) at the western end of the range. The mountains lie between the Avawatz Mountains to the north and the Bristol Mountains to the south. The Cronese Mountains are located southwest of the Soda Mountains.

== Solar energy development ==
The Soda Mountain Solar Project, a solar energy venture proposed by developers Regenerate Power of Menlo Park, California, is sited near the Joshua Tree and Death Valley national parks. The project was proposed in 2007 as a 358-MW (megawatt ) enterprise sited on 2,557 acres (1,035 ha) of land owned by the Bureau of Land Management (BLM), partly as a result of the Obama administration’s ambitions to develop 20,000 MWs of renewable energy on public lands by 2020. In the spring of 2015, the BLM reduced the project to 287-MW on 1,923 acres (778 ha), primarily due to potential threats to the Bighorn sheep and other wildlife in the area. The BLM also decided that Regenerate Power must secure state and county permits from the San Bernardino County Supervisors, thereby giving them the final say regarding any progression of the project. On August 23, 2016, the San Bernardino County Supervisors’ decided to deny development of the project. The board attributed its 3-2 rejection of the Environmental Impact Report to the realization that “the project would degrade pristine desert land with little benefit to area residents.” According to 5th district Supervisor Josie Gonzales, “The door could be open to another look if somehow the proponents could provide power from their plant to San Bernardino County residents at a lower price to offset the plant’s downsides.” Reyad Fezzani, chairman and CEO of Regenerate Power, remained optimistic in plans to move forward with the project. A decade later, in 2026, the California Energy Commission approved the project along with a 1.2 GWh battery, with concessions for migratory bighorn sheep.
