= Avawatz Mountains =

Prominence in the Mojave Desert, California

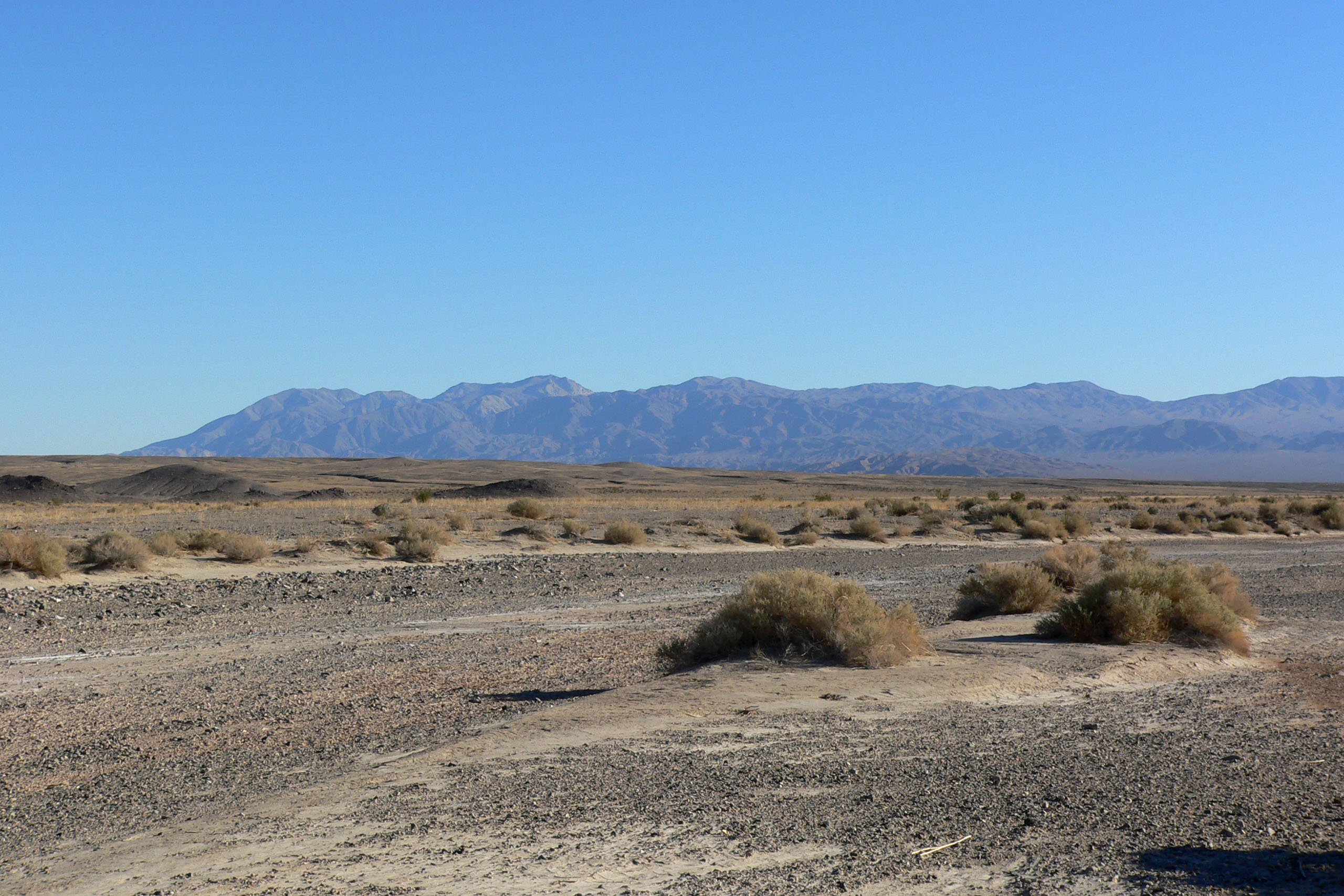
- Seen from the north, in Death Valley

Highest point
- Elevation: 1,872.7 m (6,144 ft)

Geography
- Location within California
- Country: United States
- State: California
- District: San Bernardino County
- Range coordinates: 35°30′25″N 116°17′05″W
- Topo map: USGS Sheep Creek Spring

The Avawatz Mountains are located in San Bernardino County, California, in the Mojave Desert.

== Name ==
There are several theories for the origin of the name Avawatz. It could be derived from the Mohave Indian term "Avi-Ahwat", or "red rock". Alternatively, the name comes from the Southern Paiute word iva-wätz, meaning "white mountain sheep," or another Southern Paiute word, ávawatz, meaning "gypsum".

== Geography ==
The range lies to the west of State Route 127; between the Owlshead Mountains in the southern end of Death Valley National Park, and the Soda Mountains near the town of Baker. The range is at the intersection of the Garlock Fault and the Death Valley Fault Zone. As such, it is considered the southern end of the Walker Lane geologic trough.

Part of the Avawatz Mountain range lies in the National Training Center, which is part of the Fort Irwin Military Reservation, and is closed to the public.

The Avawatz Mountains reach an elevation of 1,872.7 meters (6,144 ft).
