= History of San Bernardino, California =

San Bernardino, California, was named in 1810.

== Earliest inhabitants ==
San Bernardino's earliest known inhabitants were Serrano Indians (Spanish for "people of the mountains") who spent their winters in the valley, and their summers in the cooler mountains. They were known as the "Yuhaviatam" or People of the Pines. They have lived in the valley since approximately 1000 B.C. They lived in small brush covered structures. At the time the Spanish first visited the valley, approximately 1500 Serranos inhabited the area. They lived in villages of ten to thirty structures that the Spanish named rancherías.

The Tongva Indians also called the San Bernardino area Wa'aach in their language.

== Spanish California ==
Spanish Military Commander of California Pedro Fages probably entered San Bernardino Valley in 1772. Missionary priest Father Francisco Garcés entered the valley in 1774, as did the de Anza Expedition, though not in present-day San Bernardino but further south.

The traditional (since there is a dispute as to the following events) founding and naming of San Bernardino is that Padre Francisco Dumetz, a Franciscan priest, made a trip from the Mission San Gabriel Arcángel to the San Bernardino Valley on May 20, 1810, the feast day of Saint Bernardino of Siena during California's mission period. That year Politana, the first Spanish settlement in the San Bernardino Valley, was established by the Mission San Gabriel as a mission chapel and supply station for travelers on the road into California from Sonora. It was located at the ranchería of the Guachama Indians who lived on the bluff now known as Bunker Hill.

== Mission California ==
In 1819, the San Gabriel Mission created an estancia, the San Bernardino de Sena Estancia, at an Indian rancheria called Guachama, the site of which is in modern-day Redlands, California, and Rancho San Bernardino. A group of adobe buildings were constructed around 1830. The Mill Creek zanja, an irrigation ditch from Mill Creek to the site, was dug by local Indians for the Franciscans. The site was closed when Governor Figueroa closed down the mission system in 1834. The site would later be known as "Old San Bernardino." Today, the site is historically known as the "San Bernardino Asistencia."

Jedediah Strong Smith entered the valley with 15 trappers in late November 1826 on the way to Mission San Gabriel, crossing over the San Bernardino Mountains by the Mojave Trail route over Monument Peak.

The expedition of Antonio Armijo first established the trade of the Old Spanish Trail between Nuevo Mexico and Mission San Gabriel in Alta California in 1829–1830. Their route entered the San Bernardino Valley by a route Armijo called "Cañon de San Bernardino" from the upper Mojave River west through Cajon Pass and down Crowder Canyon and then Cajon Canyon. This route was known to the vaqueros of the San Bernardino de Sena Estancia who had come to the aid of Armijo's party with food. This route ran along the course of Crowder Canyon to its mouth at Cajon Canyon and down to the mouth of the canyon at Sycamore Grove.

Kit Carson and a group of trappers went through the Cajon Pass in 1830. The Cajon Pass was used by many early explorers, settlers, and traders going to places further west.

== Rancho period ==
After the Mission system was dismantled by the Mexican government in 1833, several prominent Southern Californians attempted to acquire Rancho San Bernardino. In 1837, Antonia Pico and Andres Pico made an application for the land, but it was rejected. Ygnacio Palomares, applied for the right to graze cattle in the eastern San Bernardino Valley. Governor Juan Bautista Alvarado rejected the application. Instead, the governor approved a settlement plan by Antonio Maria Lugo. Lugo's proposal was to colonize the San Bernardino area, listing 27 prospective settlers.

In 1839, the Lugo's colonization permit was granted for 18 leagues of land. In the same year, the Lugo Family built an adobe house where the current county courthouse sits today.

The plan for colonization was not successful. In 1841, Antonio Lugo prepared another petition. This time, it requested a land grant in the name of three of his sons, José del Carmen Lugo, José Maria Lugo, Vicente Lugo, and José del Carmen's friend, Diego Sepulveda.

On June 21, 1842, Rancho San Bernardino was granted to Antonio Maria Lugo, his sons and his nephews, who grazed approximately 4000–6000 cattle in the area. The grant included a large part of the San Bernardino valley, 37,700 acres (153 km^{2}) in all. Lugo's adobe would later become Amasa M. Lyman's house. His brother repaired the Estancia and lived there. A community that grew up astride the Santa Ana River northeast of current-day Redlands would be known as Lugonia. It lost its identity with the November 1888 incorporation of Redlands.

By offering land, Lugo convinced a group of settlers from Abiquiu, New Mexico, to settle on the rancho at Politania and defend it against Indian raiders and outlaws preying on the herds of the Ranchos in Southern California. These emigrants first colonized Politana on the Rancho San Bernardino in 1842. Don Lorenzo Trujillo brought the first colony of settlers from New Mexico to settle on land provided by the Lugos about one half mile south of the Indian village of La Politana. These colonists included William Workman, John A. Rowland (later owners of Rancho La Puente) and Benjamin Davis Wilson. After remaining about two years at La Politana, Don Lorenzo, and four other families of colonists were persuaded move to 2,000 acres of land on the east side of the Santa Ana River, on the northern boundary of the Rancho Jurupa offered to them by Don Juan Bandini. This village was known as "La Placita de los Trujillos", later called La Placita.

In 1843 a second party of colonists, commanded by Don Jose Tomas Salazar, arrived at La Politana. Among the settlers of this second colony were Louis Rubidoux and Christobal Slover, both married to Mexican women. In 1845, the Salazar colonists too moved to the Santa Ana River, one mile northeast of La Placita and there founded the village known as Agua Mansa. To replace the New Mexicans as guardians of their herds, the Lugos brought Mountain Cahuilla tribesmen under their leader, Juan Antonio, to settle in Politana. They remained there until 1851, when they killed all but one of the Irving Gang in San Timoteo Canyon. These were American brigands that had raided the Ranchos in the valley and were hunted down on orders of the local justice of the peace. Due to the ill feeling among the American population resulting from this incident, shortly afterward the Cahuilla moved east to a new rancheria at Saahatpa in the San Gorgonio Pass near Banning, California.

Also in 1843, Michael White (also known in Spanish as Miguel Blanco), a Mexican citizen of English origin, was granted Rancho Muscupiabe, named after the Serrano village Amuscupiabit, "Place of little pines." Michael White built a house overlooking the Cajon Pass, but Native Americans from the desert stole his grazing stock, and he abandoned the Rancho after nine months.

== Mormon San Bernardino ==
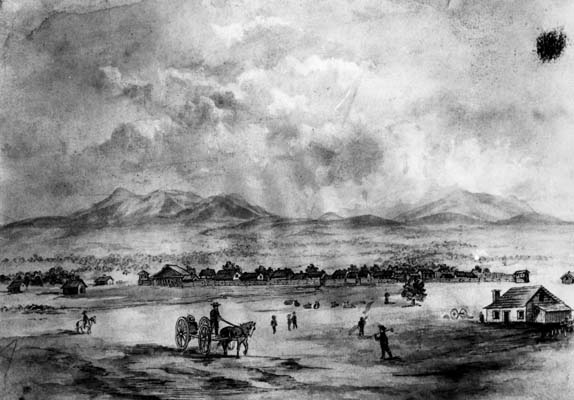
Drawing of Fort San Bernardino, 1852

In 1847, after hostilities of the Mexican–American War had ended, the Mormon Battalion of the U.S. Army occupied San Diego and Los Angeles. A detachment of the Los Angeles troops, led by Captain Jefferson Hunt was stationed at the southern end of the Cajon Pass to protect Mexican ranchos from Indian raids. The Battalion had started in Council Bluffs, Iowa, on July 10, 1846, and arrived in San Diego on January 29, 1847. Company C was dispatched to guard the Cajon Pass. On furloughs, Captain Hunt and others worked for Rancho Santa Ana del Chino owner Isaac Williams. After the War, the Battalion mainly went to Utah. Many Battalion troops returned to families in Utah via San Francisco and the Sacramento area. A group led by Hunt traveled to Salt Lake City by way of the Old Spanish Trail through the Cajon Pass with which they were so familiar.

After rejoining his family in Utah, Hunt got the contract for mail delivery between Salt Lake and Los Angeles. He also organized several cattle drives, buying stock from ranchos owners to deliver to hungry Mormons in Utah. It was during this time that Hunt started preliminary negotiations with Williams with the idea of buying Rancho del Chino.

Mormon leader Brigham Young saw Southern California as a supply source for Utah, and as an immigration and mail stop between Salt Lake City and San Pedro, California. A group of almost 500 Mormons left Utah for California in 1851. They found abundant water in the valley, along with willows, sycamores, cottonwood and mustard, as well as the Yucca plant. The Mormon contingent was led by Captain David Seely (later first Stake President), Captain Jefferson Hunt and Captain Andrew Lytle, and included Apostles Amasa M. Lyman and Charles C. Rich. They first made camp at the Sycamore Grove, about 1.5 miles (2.4 km) southeast of the present Glen Helen Regional Park. They stayed until the sale of Rancho San Bernardino could be arranged.

In September 1851, Lugo sold the Rancho to members of the Church of Jesus Christ of Latter-day Saints (Mormons). The Rancho included most of modern San Bernardino among other areas, though part of the northern areas of the City were part of Rancho Muscupiabe. The price for 40,000 acres (160 km^{2}) was $77,000 with $7,000 down.

The Mormons built Fort San Bernardino at the site of the present county courthouse. Inside the fort, they had small stores, and outside, they grew wheat and other crops. They later moved outside the walls of the fort when feared attacks did not materialize. The Mormon Council House was built in 1852. It was used as the post office, school, church, and was the county courthouse from 1854 to 1858.

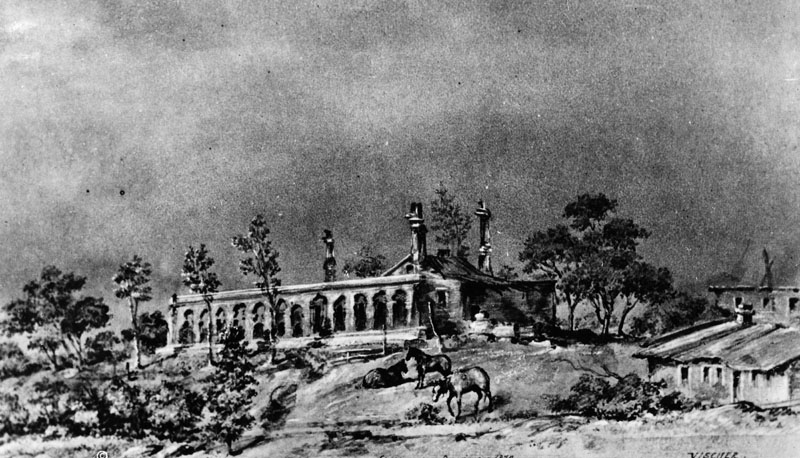
April 1865 sketch of the ruins of the Mormon Elders' residence, occupied from 1848 until 1857, when the Utah War forced an exodus from the Mormon colony

On November 7, 1852, Colonel Henry Washington, deputy surveyor (by contract with the United States Surveyor General for California) surveyed the San Bernardino Base Line and Meridian from a point just west of Mount San Bernardino, at an elevation of 10,300 feet (3,100 m), east of present-day Highland. The Base and Meridian lines serve as the initial surveying point (known as the point of beginning) for all of Southern California.

San Bernardino County was formed from Los Angeles County in 1853 based on Assemblyman Jefferson Hunt's bill.

In 1853, the Mormons laid out the current street grid system, one mile (1.6 km) square, which is based upon the grid layout of Salt Lake City. Each block was 8 acres (32,000 m^{2}). The plan was laid out by Henry G. Sherwood, and assisted by Fred T. Perris. The east–west streets were numbered, from First Street to Ninth Street. The north–south streets were named Kirtland Street (later "A" street, then Sierra Way); Camel Street (later "B" Street, then Mountain View Avenue; Crafton Street (later "C" Street, then Arrowhead Avenue); Utah Street (later "D" Street); Salt Lake Street (later "E" Street); California Street (later "F" Street); Independence Street (later "G" Street"); Nauvoo Street (later "H" Street); and Far West Street (later "I" Street). The Mormons also built a road in 1853 to Los Angeles. The Mormons were responsible for the school system, creating Warm Springs, a school still in use today, as well as a school at the present site of Pioneer Park.

The City of San Bernardino was incorporated on April 1, 1854. Mormon Apostle Amasa M. Lyman (who was later excommunicated, then posthumously reinstated) was the City's first Mayor. Apostle Charles Coulson Rich became the second Mayor. At incorporation, there were approximately 1,200 residents, 900 of them Mormons. They dominated local politics and forbade drinking and gambling. Land disputes between the Mormons and other settlers in the area led to the creation of Fort Benson by non-Mormons in 1857.

Mormons created the first timber road to the mountains, and a flour mill (on Mill Street). In 1855 they diverted water from Waterman Canyon to Town Creek by means of a flume.

The Mormons created a temple block (but never a temple) in the center of the newly-laid out town between present-day 5th, 6th, E, and F Streets. They created a "Public Square," in which they celebrated the 4th of July. Later, after the Mormons returned to Utah, part of the land went to the Catholic Church, and part went to Dr. and Mrs. Quinn. In 1873, Bishop Amat, the bishop of the Los Angeles and Monterrey Diocese, granted the northern part of the block to the City. It was later called "City Park," then "Lugo Park" until 1915, when it was renamed Pioneer Park, which it is still called today. A Pavilion, a log cabin, and the Municipal Auditorium (erected in 1921 to honor the dead of World War I) were all built in the park, though the Pavilion and log cabin burnt down, and the Auditorium was torn down in 1979. The Norman F. Feldheym Library was built on the site in 1985. The park also contains two Civil War cannons.

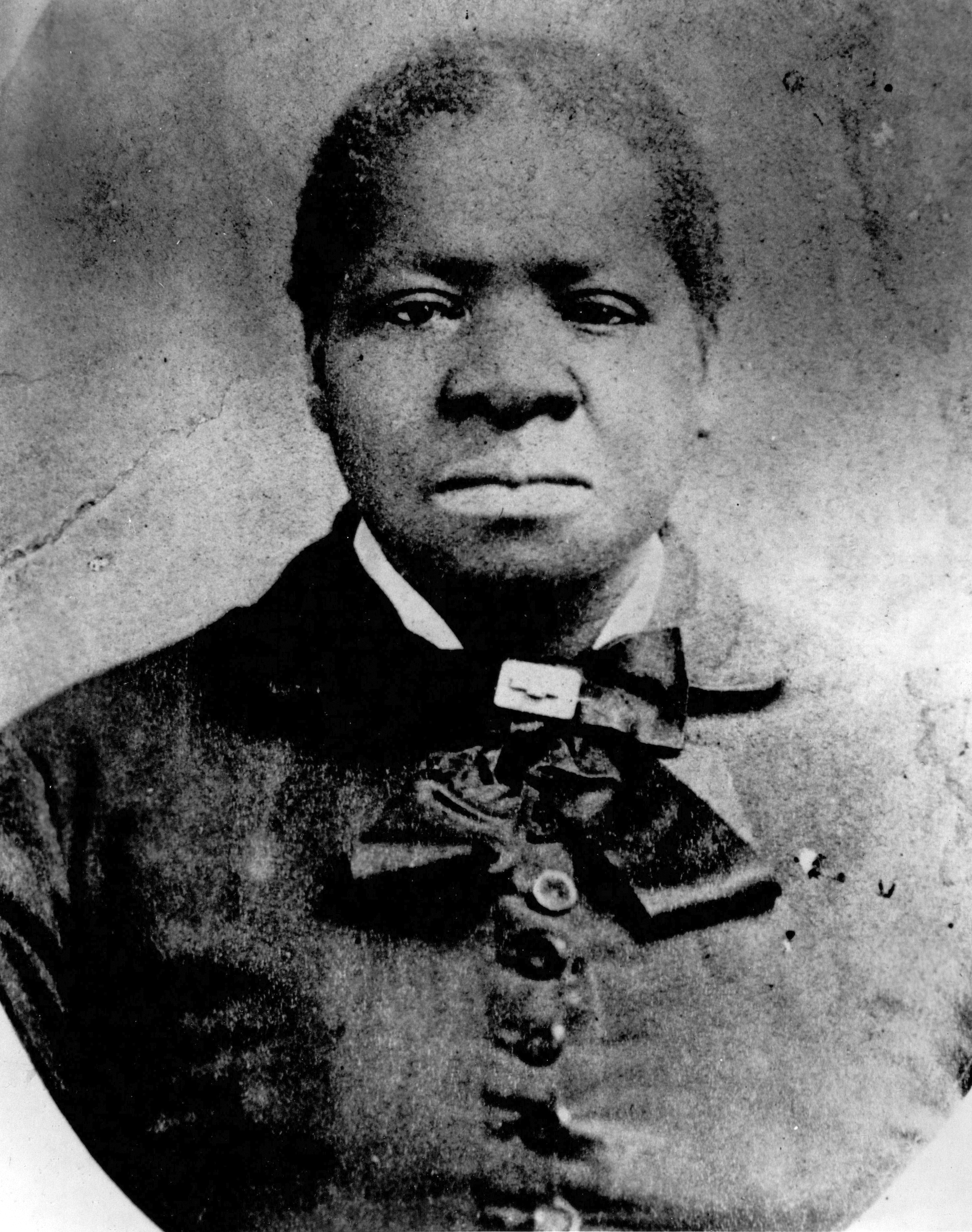
Biddy Mason was one of 14 black Americans who sued for their freedom after being illegally held captive.

The Mormons named the Arrowhead, a natural rock formation above Arrowhead Springs, the "Ace of Spades." On a clear day, the Arrowhead can be seen from downtown San Bernardino.

A small Jewish community formed in Mormon San Bernardino, including Lewis Jacobs and Marcus Katz in 1852. Lewis Jacobs was a miner and a peddler. He co-owned a mountain sawmill, started the original Bank of San Bernardino, and helped establish the Home of Eternity Cemetery. Services began in the 1850s, but Congregation Emanuel, still active today, was not officially chartered until 1891, and its first structure was built in 1921. The Home of Eternity Cemetery was given by the Mormons to the Jews. It is the oldest Jewish cemetery in continuous use in Southern California. Marcus Katz was a merchant and civic leader and the namesake of the four-story Katz Building (built in the 1890s) at Third and "E" Streets. He died in 1899.

There were 26 slaves in the first company, and more slaves were brought over as San Bernardino continued to grow. Since California was a free state, the slaves should have been freed when they entered. However, slavery was openly tolerated. Many of the slaves could not read or write and were ignorant of the law. Judge Benjamin Hayes freed 14 slaves, including Biddy Mason, who had belonged to Robert Smith, who claimed he still owned them. Other slaves were freed by their masters.

== Mormon recall ==
The Mormons were recalled by President Brigham Young back to Salt Lake City in 1857. The reason for the failure of the community cannot be found in just one underlying cause: there was the anti-Mormon persecution (mostly apostasized members), the short-lived Utah War, the recall of the two Apostles, Lyman and Rich, or the inexperience of the mostly new member congregation. However the news of the Mountain Meadows massacre, that came down the Mormon Road to Southern California, created a climate of fear of, and hostility to the Mormons there, where before was a good opinion of them generally. In light of the persecutions that had previously been visited on the Mormons in Illinois and Missouri, this hostility influenced about 2,000 of the 3,000 Mormons in the county to flee California for Utah They often sold their land for only the price of a wagon, team and supplies to make the trip, far below the worth of their well run farms, mills and other businesses.

Another possible explanation for the recall was Young's fear of a rival settlement to Salt Lake in a better location with a better climate with greater agricultural possibilities. Many Mormon migrants were expecting to go to California from the beginning. Young was probably headed there all along as demonstrated by a vanguard shipload of Mormons organized by Samuel Brannan who had already arrived in San Francisco from New York and were waiting for the main party there. The Mormon Battalion was also there, at the expense of the US Government to which Young had offered the manpower as a way of getting them to California. Brannan met Young in Utah and tried to convince him to keep going. Young ignored his advice and stopped at Salt Lake before himself returning east for the winter. Brannan returned to San Francisco. Young was later interested in California as a source of resupply and of tithing income from Mormon gold diggers. He was not happy with the large response in Utah to the Lyman and Rich call for San Bernardino. He was wary of Lyman and Rich's independence and feared a mass migration from Utah to California. At one point sentries were placed around settlements and along the trails to prevent Mormons from leaving Utah at the risk of being shot. Young, who had authorized the venture, undermined the San Bernardino operation almost from the beginning and guaranteed its failure and the financial loss of the investors by calling them back just before the mortgage was paid off, depressing the value of the real estate as they all rushed to sell. Many who had already made great sacrifices for the Church were wiped out again by Young's far from benign actions. Many were forced to sell their property at a fraction of their original cost.

Though some of the Mormons remained, mainline Latter-day Saint structures were not reestablished until the 1920s. The remaining residents lacked organization and resources to compensate for the mass departure of the predominant Mormon population, which devastated the local economy. The city disincorporated. Among the people remaining was Celia Mounts Hunt, Captain Hunt's wife. She died on January 28, 1897, and is buried in Pioneer Cemetery.

In 1857, three orange trees were planted in Old San Bernardino. They were not the Washington Navel Orange that would later achieve great fame; they came in 1873 from Brazil to Riverside, California, then a part of San Bernardino County.

The city continued to develop in the Mormon absence, largely as a commercial center. Dr. Ben Barton arrived in 1858, erecting an adobe drugstore/office at 4th and "C" (now Arrowhead Avenue) Street. Barton also became postmaster, County Superintendent of Schools, and purchased the estancia which is today on Barton Road in Redlands, and moved there with his family. He died in 1899.

== 1860s and 1870s ==
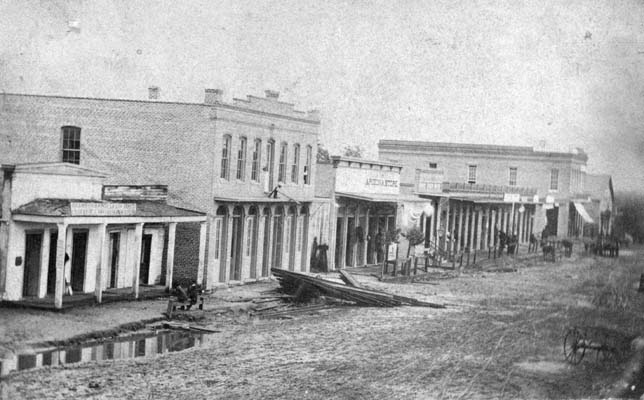
San Bernardino, 1865

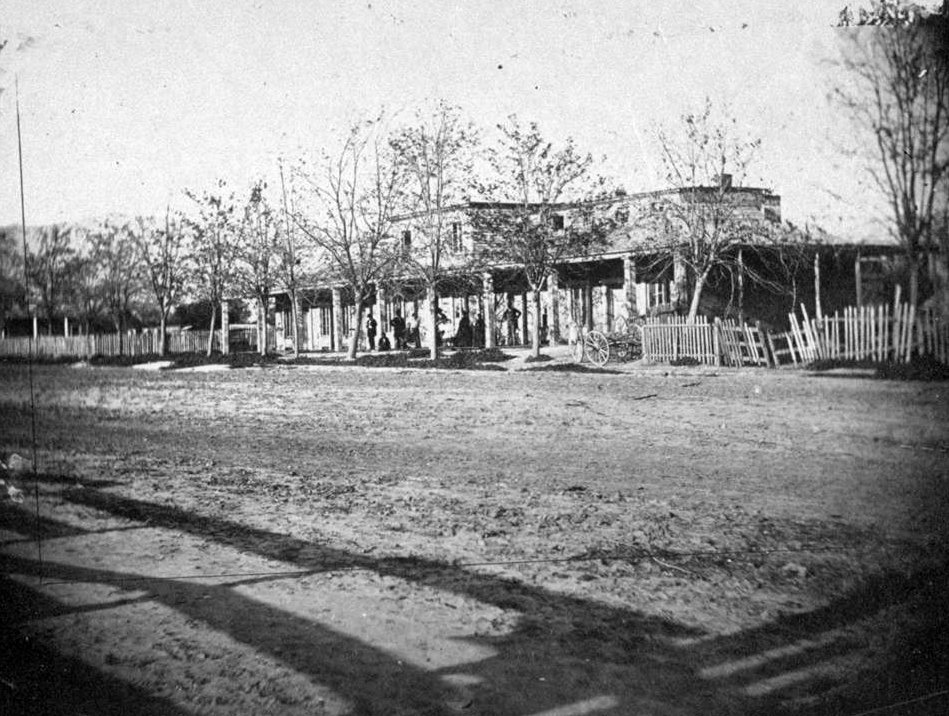
Amasa Lyman's house was the residence of O. M. Wozencraft in 1863.

Gold was discovered by William Francis "Bill" Holcomb in the Holcomb and Bear Valleys in 1860. The boom-town of Belleville briefly threatened to take the county seat away from San Bernardino. San Bernardino won by one vote.

California remained in the Union during the Civil War, however, there were many Confederate sympathizers in the area. A brief skirmish between Unionists and Confederate sympathizers erupted in the mountains.

The stagecoaches of Phineas Banning had a stop in downtown San Bernardino during the 1860s.

The Great Flood of 1862 largely destroyed the earlier settlement of Agua Mansa, settled in the 1830s by New Mexicans in present-day Colton. The Catholic Church there was rebuilt in downtown San Bernardino in 1865. That wooden church burnt down in 1878 and another was built. The present church, at the corner of Fifth Street and "F" was built in 1910. The flood caused severe damage along the Santa Ana River's tributaries, particularly Lytle Creek. Topsoil was washed away.

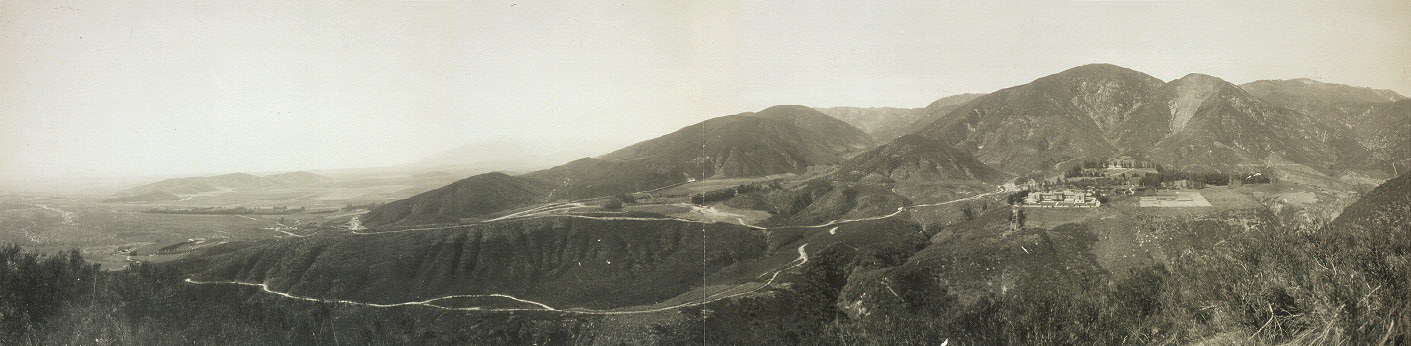
Arrowhead Hot Springs, San Bernardino, CA, 1908

In 1864, "Dr." David Noble Smith established a "treatment house" at the Arrowhead hot springs. By 1868, it had been enlarged to create a hotel. In 1885, he leased the property to Darby and Lyman of Los Angeles. Three days after Smith's death on March 17, 1885, the hotel burnt down. Darby and Lyman incorporated the Arrowhead Hot Springs Company, and rebuilt a new hotel in 1886 for $150,000. After it was expanded to 120 rooms it was the largest hotel in the San Bernardino area until it, too, burnt down on July 4, 1895. The third hotel was built by Seth Marshall in 1905. In 1930, it was purchased by a consortium of Hollywood types. In the days before air travel, it was marketed to Hollywood stars like Loretta Young, Mary Pickford, Spencer Tracy, and Humphrey Bogart. A forest fire destroyed the third hotel in November 1938. The present structure (the fourth hotel) opened in December 1939 at a cost of $1.5 million. This time, the hotel was six stories, and the grand opening featured Judy Garland, Al Jolson, and Rudy Vallee. However, World War II caused the hotel to be taken over as naval hospital in 1944. After the war, Elizabeth Taylor spent her honeymoon with Conrad Hilton on the sixth floor. The hotel was purchased by Campus Crusade for Christ in 1962. It was used as world headquarters until 1991. It was operated as a Christian Conference Center in 1999. The City of San Bernardino is trying to annex the property into the City as part of a private development and redevelopment of Arrowhead Springs. In 1894, Arrowhead Brand Mountain Spring Water began to be pumped from near the site, as it is today. However, Arrowhead Brand Water also comes from "natural mountain sources in the United States and Canada" since it was purchased by Nestle Waters North America, Inc.

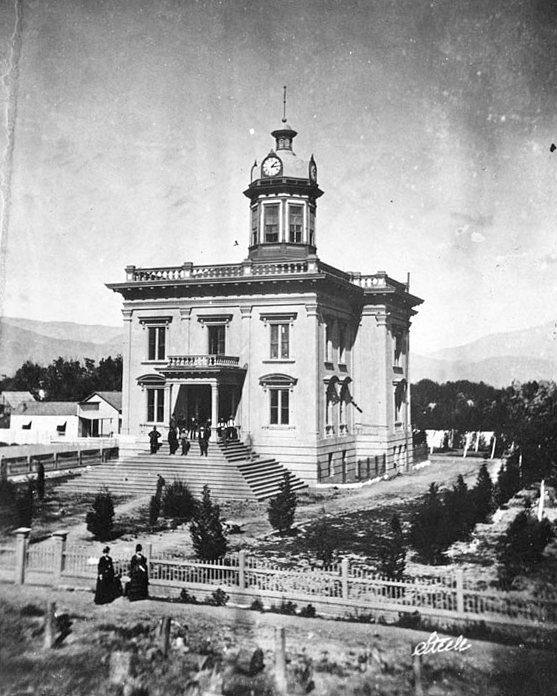
The first permanent Courthouse, 1874

A young Wyatt Earp and his family traveled to San Bernardino by wagon train, arriving in 1864. Virgil Earp later settled in Colton, California, where he became town marshal. Late in life, in the 1920s, Wyatt became a ceremonial San Bernardino County Deputy Sheriff.

In 1866, militia forces from San Bernardino killed Serrano men, women, and children in a 32-day campaign. Yuhaviatam tribal leader Santos Manuel (from whom the name "San Manuel" comes) led the remaining Yuhaviatam from the mountains to valley floor.

In August 1867, the first Chinese immigrants arrived in San Bernardino. By 1870, there were 16 young males, including Ah Wing and Jim Kang. They were laundry men, cooks, and houseboys, according to the Census. During a statewide depression in 1875, San Bernardino's Caucasian residents criticized the Chinese for depressing wage rates. The Chinese were forced to move in 1878 to a Chinatown on Third Street between what is now Arrowhead Avenue and Sierra Way. By the late 1890s, San Bernardino's Chinatown had between 400–600 residents. Many of its residents worked in produce, with farms in what would become the Base Line Gardens tract east of Waterman Avenue. By the mid-1920s, Chinatown was largely abandoned. It became the site for Caltrans. When the Caltrans buildings were torn down, several Chinese artifacts were found. The site is being prepared for a parking lot, and is slated to eventually become a new central court building.

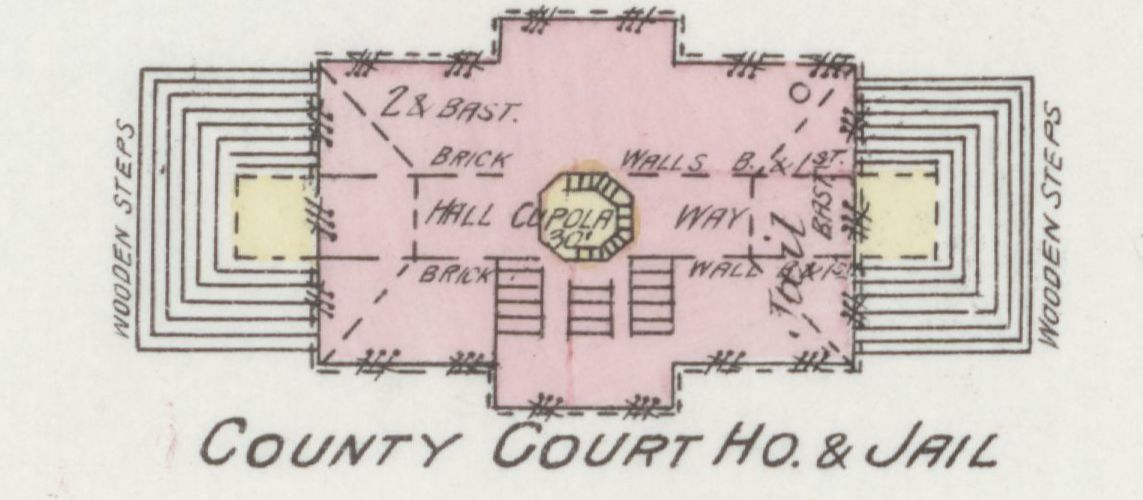
San Bernardino County Courthouse and Jail in January 1887 from a Sanborn fire insurance map

By the 1870s, the City had several large stores and two hotels.

Though the first orange trees were planted in the county in 1857, in 1873 the first Washington Navel Orange tree was planted in Riverside, then a part of San Bernardino County. The area, like many others in Southern California, became associated with oranges. An orange still graces the city seal today, and represents all agriculture in the City.

In 1874, the County established the first permanent courthouse built for that purpose, a two-story structure.

== Rail wars, rise to local prominence ==
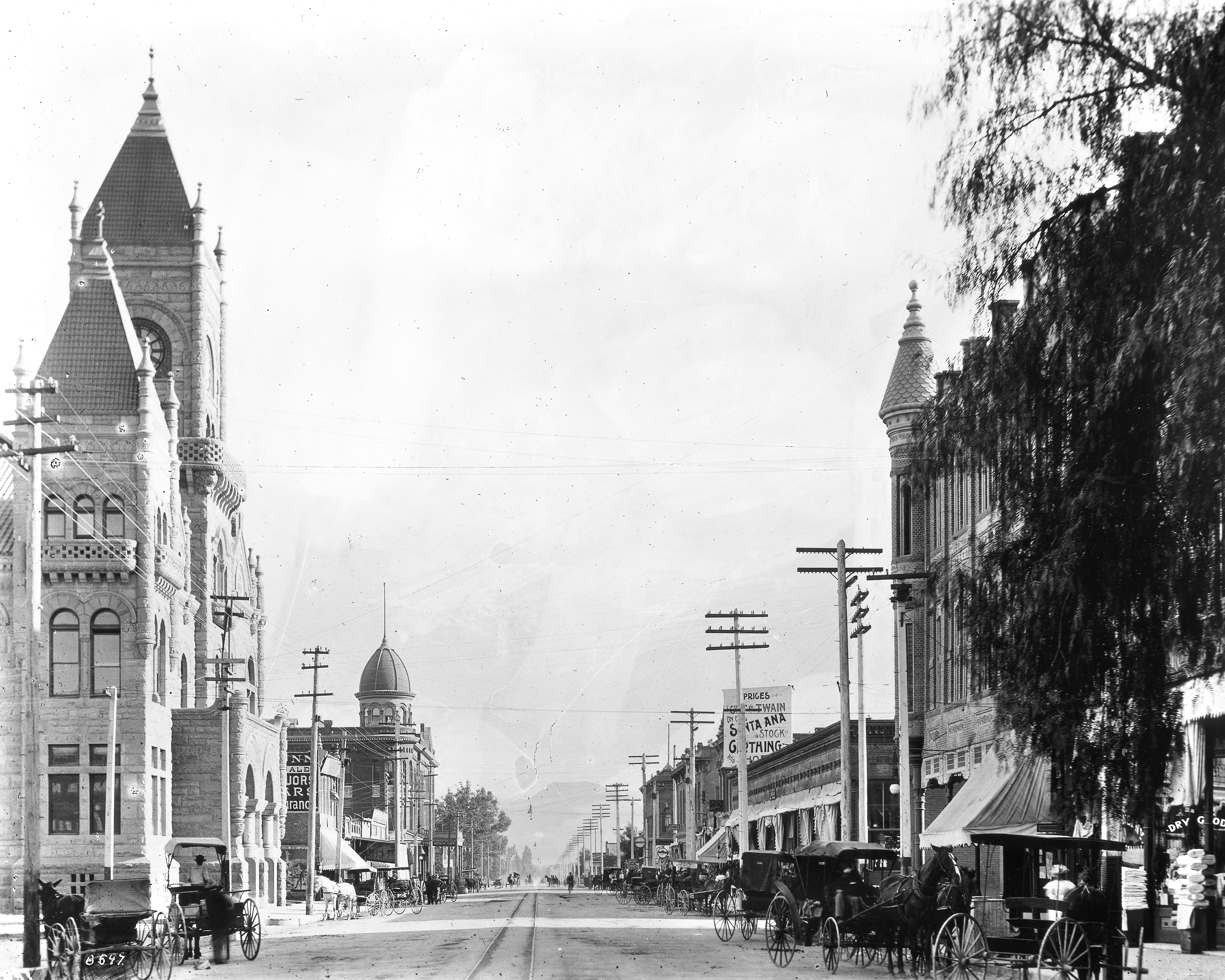
San Bernardino, c. 1905

In 1873, The Southern Pacific Railroad (SP) wanted to lay its tracks in San Bernardino, however, the City and the Railroad could not come to terms, so the SP founded Colton, California, and put its tracks south of San Bernardino. The city's first railroad was the California Southern, which was built into San Bernardino in 1883. The California Southern was a subsidiary of the Atchison, Topeka, and Santa Fe Railroad, and was later incorporated into that system. The original California Southern depot was constructed in 1883 and destroyed by fire in 1916; it was replaced by the current Moorish-style station in 1918.

The San Pedro, Los Angeles and Salt Lake Railroad began serving San Bernardino in 1905, arriving via Santa Fe trackage rights over Cajon Pass. This railroad, soon renamed the Los Angeles and Salt Lake, (LA&SL) used as its corporate logo an adaptation of the famous "arrowhead" natural feature located north of the city. The LA&SL was fully acquired by the Union Pacific Railroad in 1921.

The City thrived as a center of commerce for local agricultural areas, including the vast orange groves of the area. In 1882, even before Los Angeles, the Opera House opened at the end of Court Street on "D" Street. It was a two-story, red brick building. It featured both light and grand opera, plays, musicians, and touring performances by such people as by Maude Adams, Lillian Russell, Al Jolson, and Sarah Bernhardt. It seated between 1,200 and 1,400. After it was remodeled in 1912, it began to show motion pictures as well. The Opera House was torn down in 1927 to extend Court Street to the 1927 Courthouse on Arrowhead Avenue.

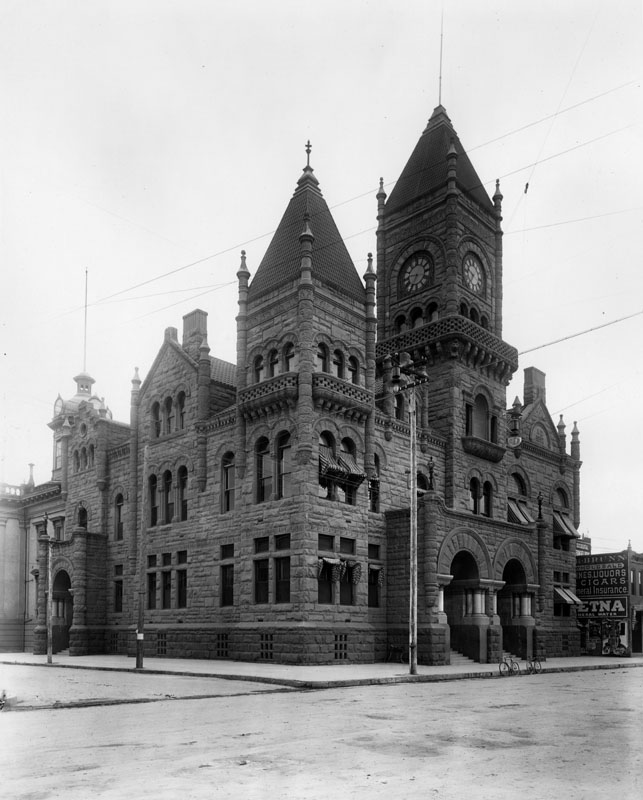
The second permanent courthouse, 1910

A political war regarding the construction of a new county courthouse in the early 1890s on Court Street, as well as various attempts to move the county seat, caused the County and City of Riverside to split off from San Bernardino County. The courthouse was built on the corner of Court and "E" Street in 1892, replacing the 1874 courthouse. The Courthouse would be demolished in 1928 after building the current courthouse in 1927 along the extended court street at 351 North Arrowhead Avenue.

San Bernardino developed a thriving red light district on "D" Street in downtown, until it was closed in 1941 at the behest of the War Department. It is said that the building north of the corner of "D" Street and Court Street, built of brick in the 1880s and known as the "Wixom Block" was the site of one such brothel; tiny windows are located at the top as lookouts. The corner of 3rd and D Streets was known as "Whiskey Point" with a saloon on every corner.

A Chinatown developed on Third Street east of Arrowhead Avenue, and survived until the 1920s. Its inhabitants grew vegetables which they peddled.

In May 1886, the City of San Bernardino reincorporated as a city 5th class (a distinction that is no longer observed by California law).

In the 1891, pursuant to the congressional Act for Relief for Mission Indians, the San Manuel Indian Reservation was established. The reservation was and is located in the San Bernardino foothills, originally on 657 acres (2.7 km^{2}) of steep foothills to the top of McKinley Mountain. The land was not suitable for agriculture and the San Manuels lived in poverty until the opening of Indian Bingo in 1986, and the later casino and water bottling plant in the 1990s and 2000s. The reservation has expanded by federalization of land purchased by or on behalf of the tribe to just over 800 acres (3.2 km^{2}) today.

== 20th century ==
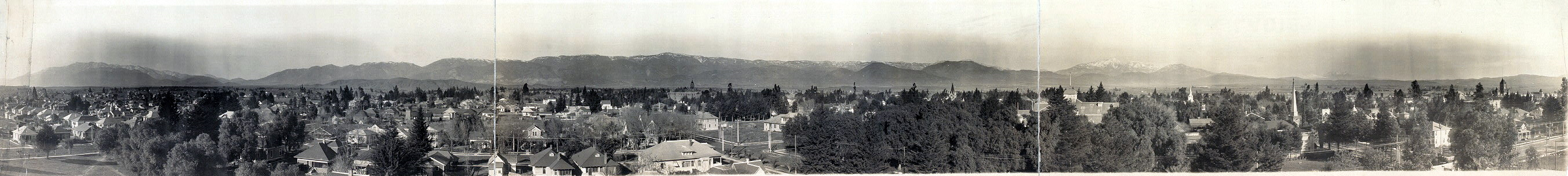
San Bernardino, California, city and village, 1909

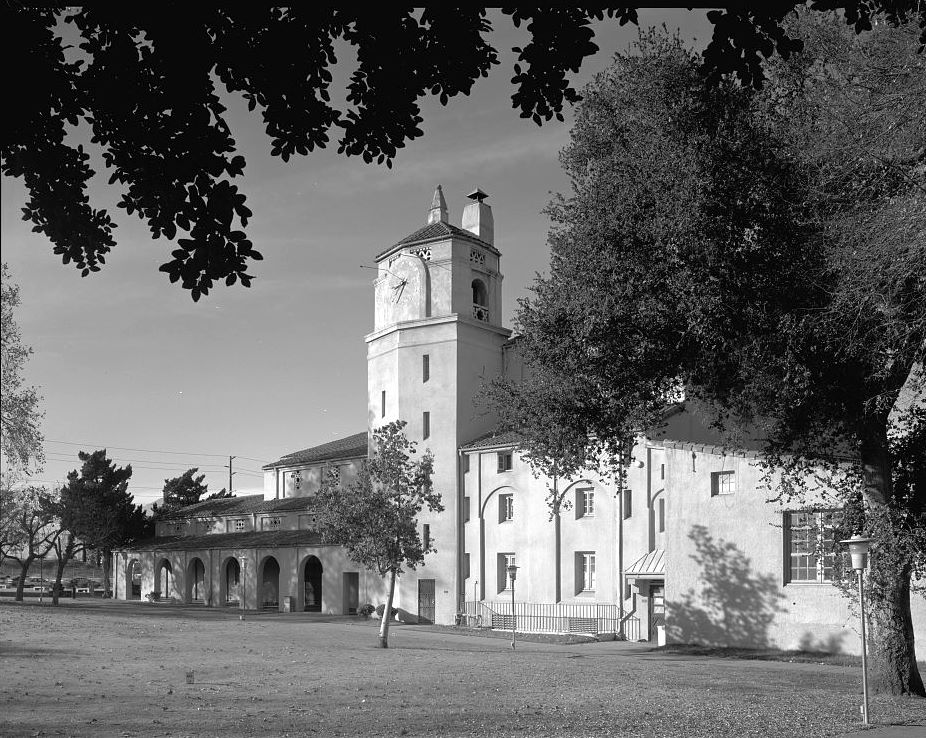
San Bernardino Valley College Auditorium Tower, circa 1933

By around the start of the 20th century, there were 6,150 residents in the City of San Bernardino.

By San Bernardino's "Centennial" in 1910, the population had grown to 12,779.

The National Orange Show was first held in March 1911 in a tent at Fourth and E Streets and later moved to permanent quarters on Mill and E Streets. Residents often refer to the "Orange Show Curse", because at least one unusually rainy day happens during every Orange Show.

The City continued to expand generally North and west of Downtown. By the 1920s, tracts were built north of Highland Avenue and along Valencia Avenue.

The Pacific Electric Railway reached San Bernardino with the February 8, 1911, absorption of the San Bernardino Valley Traction Company, which allowed residents to easily travel to Los Angeles and beyond. The SBVT Co. had itself consolidated with most of the street railway operations to and in nearby Redlands in 1903.

The Depression and the Dust Bowl caused a wave of migrants from Oklahoma and Arkansas to arrive in San Bernardino to work the fields in and around the City.

The Santa Ana River caused severe damage in the Los Angeles flood of 1938. Siblings Richard and Maurice McDonald opened the first McDonald's at 1398 North E Street at West 14th Street in San Bernardino, California (at 34.1255°N 117.2946°W) on May 15, 1940.

== World War II and its aftermath ==
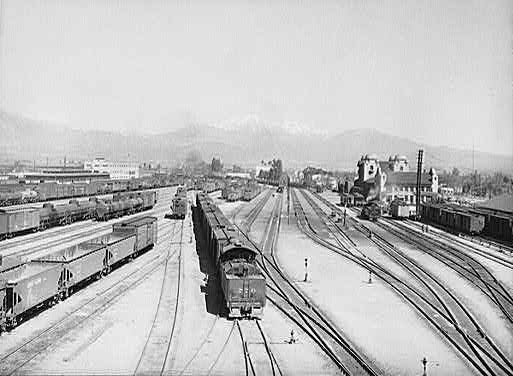
Atchison, Topeka and Santa Fe Railroad yard, San Bernardino, California, 1943

World War II brought an Army Air Corps base, San Bernardino Army Air Field, later named after Leland Francis Norton, a San Bernardino native, killed in the crash of his A-20 Havoc over Amiens, France, in 1944 after saving his crew. Camp Ono was an Army base to the west of the Shandin Hills.

Post-war prosperity, coupled with continued railroad jobs, civilian and military jobs at Norton, and at Kaiser Steel in Fontana, resulted in vast housing tracts being built in the City's North central and Del Rosa areas. At the same time, the Redevelopment Agency of the City of San Bernardino was formed in 1952 to deal with the Meadowbrook neighborhood south-east of downtown San Bernardino, Ca.

== Redevelopment and decline ==
During the 1960s, the Inland Center Mall opened, drawing business away from downtown. Interstate 15 (now I-215) bifurcated the town in a way the railroad had not. Because of the railroad right-of-way, motorists could only exit west with great difficulty. Mount Vernon Avenue, which had flourished as part of the interstate Route 66, started to decay.

Urban renewal in the 1960s caused the once-center of town, Third Street, to be gutted and replaced with the Central City Mall. Harris Company, which had opened in 1905, and opened a grand building in 1927, was one anchor; J.C. Penney's and Montgomery Wards were the two others.

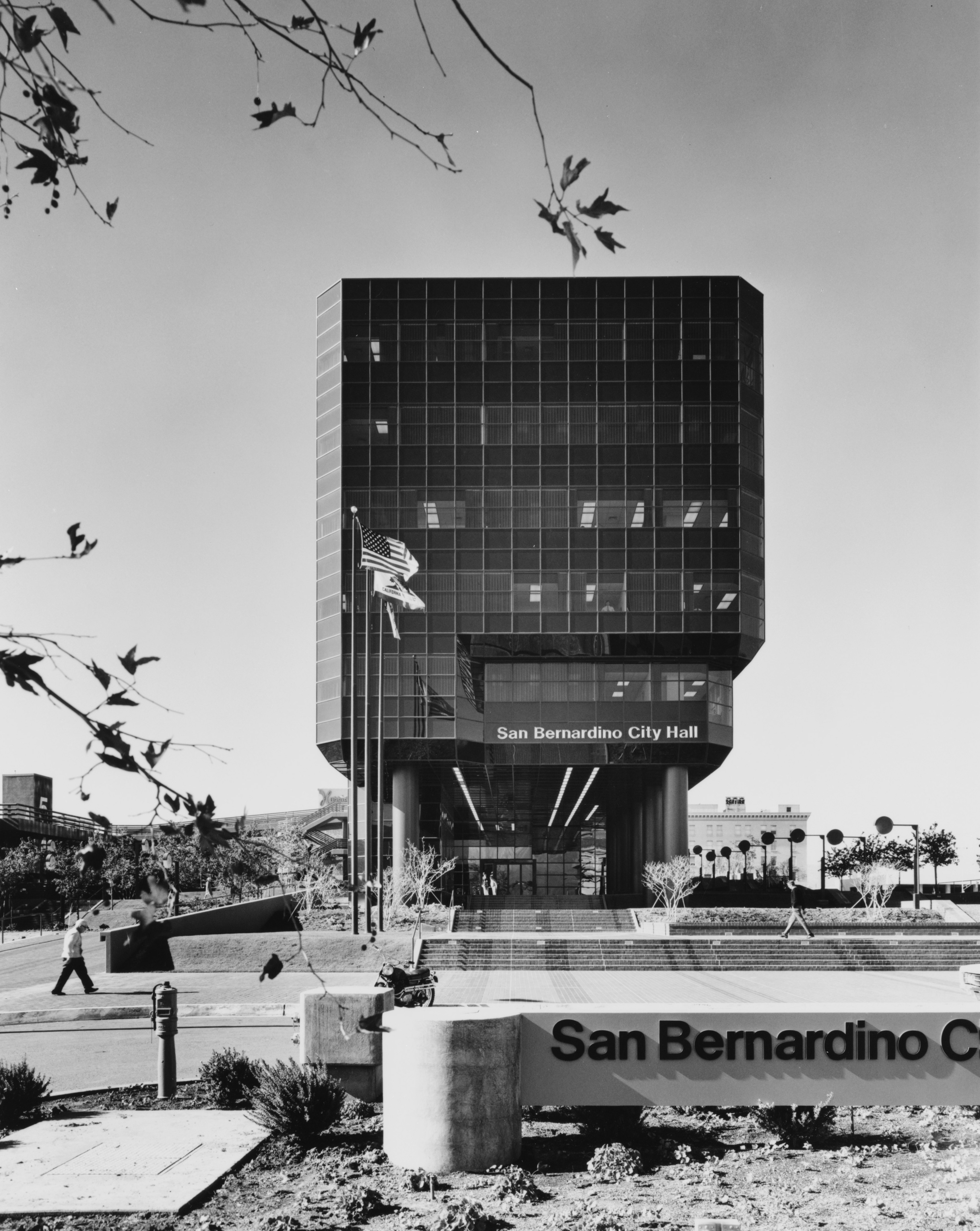
San Bernardino City Hall building designed by César Pelli

Mayor Al Ballard made headlines when he equipped city fire trucks with shotguns in response to the Watts Riots in Los Angeles, in which shots were fired at fire trucks extinguishing flames.

California State University, San Bernardino opened in 1965. According to former mayor Bob Holcomb, the city getting the CSU campus was a concrete outcome of a successful fight with the Metropolitan Water District (MWD), of which San Bernardino was a founding member. It withdrew in the 1940s after plans to route the Colorado River Aqueduct through the Cajon Pass were changed to route the aqueduct through the San Gorgonio Pass in Riverside County, and was subsequently successfully sued by Orange County over the amount of water it was using. After convincing the city that it had enough groundwater to resist political pressure to rejoin the MWD, Holcomb was appointed chairman of the waterboard in 1949, and Secombe Lake was unplugged to prove that San Bernardino had enough groundwater to sustain further growth. As Holcolm said in a 2002 interview,

...As it got closer and closer to select a site for the college, the city wasn't even going to... try, and the Chamber of Commerce, I went to the Chamber of Commerce and asked them to, you know, for a committee and let's get a college in San Bernardino... They still said we don't have the water, you know, and this was after the city had voted down MWD... I said, 'You have plenty of water.' No, so anyway, my job, I formed my own committee to bring the state college. My primary job was to convince the state that we had the water and get the water problem off the agenda so that it wouldn't shoot us down like everyone thought it would. ...We... got the three or four large land owners controlled all the land out there... to agree on a very reasonable price for their land and I got options from them that they would sell, you know, if the state selected San Bernardino. Got the city to lay out the road system and to engineer the sewer system and engineer the water system and then so all this was- and then they did all the testing that you'd normally for a developing of university- like soil tests. We had all those things done and we had a private engineering firm do a lot of work that would be normally done by the state. The board of trustees was meeting, I think was up in San Jose to, and that would be one of the items on the agenda was to select a site. So, I went up to the meeting. ...And I said, 'One thing, we have plenty of water. We can give you all the water you need.' I... showed them how the water thing was okay... And so the rest of it was slam dunk... The president of the state- the state college boards was an architect by the name of, I think, Charles Leckmen... He says, ...there's no competition. San Bernardino is so far a head of all the other sites that, that we don't have to worry about how much it's going to cost, we don't have to worry about where the roads are going to go, and so they voted that day to put it here- San Bernardino.

In the 70s, Hospitality Lane was first developed in the southern extreme of San Bernardino south of the Santa Ana River, north of the 10 freeway. This put additional pressure on downtown, a factor that continues to today, but allows San Bernardino to compete regionally for office space and tax dollars.

In 1977, the City was named an "All-America" City.

The Hampshire flood took out forty homes in January 1980. In November 1980, the Panorama fire devastated the City's northern hills; in 2003 the Old Fire caused even more damage spanning from the eastern to the western borders. The San Bernardino train disaster occurred in 1989 when a train derailed on Duffy Street, followed a few days later by an explosion on a nearby pipe.

Steve Wozniak, the co-creator of Apple Computer, held the US Festival at the Glen Helen Regional Park (in Devore) in 1982, and then again in 1983. The County of San Bernardino would later build the Blockbuster Pavilion (today, the Hyundai Pavilion) at this site.

Norton Air Force Base officially closed in 1994, an event which caused the loss of 10,000 military and civilian jobs. Renamed San Bernardino International Airport, it had no scheduled airline service and handled mostly air freight. Coupled with the recession of the early 1990s, the closing of Kaiser Steel in 1985, and Santa Fe Railroad's relocation of jobs to Topeka caused San Bernardino's economy to slide. Civic pride was further wounded when gangs pushed by LAPD suppression in Los Angeles relocated to San Bernardino. The early 1990s saw San Bernardino's crime rate increase as middle class, especially those employed at the large employers or in support of their workers, moved away.

The late 1990s to the early 2000s saw a slight upturn in fortune for San Bernardino. The City built a minor league ballpark south of downtown. Arrowhead Credit Union became a regional credit union banking leader and intended to build its new headquarters in the City. Stater Bros. Markets, a Fortune 1000 supermarket, began construction mid 2006 on a large scale distribution plant to replace the existing Grand Terrace location. Hillwood Corporation helped bring large warehouses, including those of Mattel, and Pep Boys, to the former base and its environs. The Hub project, an extension of Hospitality Lane, opened in 2004 and 2005. Live touring theater returned to the California Theater. Though outside the City and owned by the County, The Blockbuster Pavilion (now the San Manuel Amphitheater) brought national touring acts to San Bernardino.

== Recent history ==
In 2012, San Bernardino filed for chapter 9 bankruptcy.

Judge Patrick J. Morris defeated City Attorney James F. Penman in a run-off for Mayor in early 2006. Judge Morris instituted a program called "Operation Phoenix" covering a twenty-block area of central city. The program was intended to prevent crime in a high-crime area using suppression and social services.

In June 2006, the City Council defeated a measure to fly a large flag purchased after the September 11 attacks on certain legal holidays on City Hall by a vote of 4–3. The measure had failed on a 3–3 tie (with one councilmember absent) in May. The City continues to fly two regular flags in front of and on top of City Hall.

An initiative circulated by Save Our State leader Joseph Turner regarding that illegal immigration was sent to the electorate. According to the impartial analysis prepared by the City Attorney's Office, much of the initiative, even if passed, would have probably been ruled unconstitutional or would have been preempted by federal or state law. Later, Superior Court Judge A. Rex Victor disqualified the measure from the ballot after the City filed a declaratory relief action based on a challenge by local attorney Florentino ("Tino") Garza. The court ruled that Turner had not gathered enough signatures to qualify the measure. Turner, acting on the advice of City Clerk Rachel Clark-Mendoza, had based the number on the 2001 mayoral election (in which Judith Valles ran unopposed), instead of the 2005 mayoral election (which was contested). After the defeat, Turner vowed to bring a new, harsher measure to the ballot, and he mounted an ultimately unsuccessful campaign to replace Clark-Mendoza, herself, as City Clerk by arguing that her alleged incompetence and/or corruption resulted in: uncollected tax revenues; unlicensed home rentals; and, absentee landlords that were lowering property values across the entire city.

=== Terrorist attack ===
On December 2, 2015, husband and wife Syed Rizwan Farook and Tashfeen Malik committed a terrorist attack at the Center, which resulted in 14 deaths and 22 injuries. The shooters reportedly targeted an event for employees of the San Bernardino County Department of Public Health, held in an auditorium with about 80 people. The County had rented the conference center portion of the three building complex. The shooters fled in an SUV. The perpetrators were killed by police after gunfire was exchanged with the occupants of the SUV. Farook had earlier attended the event.

== Historical San Bernardino today ==
Vestiges of historical San Bernardino still exist today, though much has been demolished either through natural progress of smaller buildings giving way to larger buildings, through urban redevelopment and renewal, through natural disasters, through code enforcement demolitions, or through arson. Casualties include the California Hotel (built in the 1920s, demolished for a parking lot in the 1980s); the Stewart Hotel (burnt in the 1890s, rebuilt, burnt on Thanksgiving Day 1935); the Platt Building (torn down in the 1990s for the new State Building (aka the "Super Block"); Third Street (the commercial center of town, torn down in the 1960s for the Central City (later Carousel) Mall, the Carnegie Library; Remaining historical buildings include The Andreson Building (built in 1927), now The Enterprise Building, Pioneer Cemetery at Seventh and Sierra Way, the Harris' Company building (built in 1927); the central courthouse (built in 1926, and currently being seismically retrofitted); the Pioneer building (modeled after the City Hall of Seville Spain), Superior Court Judge George E. Otis' house (a Queen Anne Victorian house moved to the "carriage corner" of 8th and "D" Street); the Arrowhead Springs Hotel (the fourth structure, built in 1939) and former vaudeville/movie palace California Theater on Third Street. The San Bernardino County Museum has historical exhibits, including a model of Fort San Bernardino. The house where the McDonald brothers lived while creating their first burger restaurant still sits on the hilltop on Beverly Drive.

== Timeline ==
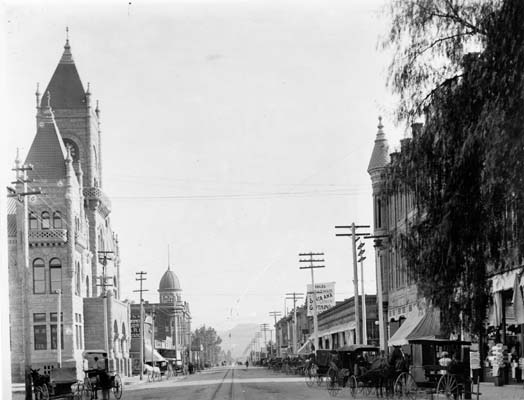
San Bernardino, 1895

- 1810 – Padre Francisco Dumetz, a Spanish priest, names San Bernardino (the valley) on May 20, 1810, feast day of St. Bernardine of Siena. Politana, a mission chapel and supply station of the Mission San Gabriel, was the first Spanish settlement in the San Bernardino Valley.
- 1812
  - The M6.9–7.5 San Juan Capistrano earthquake affected Alta California with a maximum Mercalli intensity of VII (Very strong) to IX (Violent), killing 40 parishioners at Mission San Juan Capistrano.
  - Serrano attacked and destroyed Politana.
- 1829 – San Bernardino Asistencia, a more permanent outpost structure of Mission San Gabriel, constructed.
- 1830 – January 28, the expedition of Antonio Armijo descended to the San Bernardino Valley, from the head of the Mojave River to the mouth of Cajon Canyon to establish the first route of the Old Spanish Trail trade between Nuevo Mexico and Alta California
- 1842 – Rancho San Bernardino granted to Antonio Maria Lugo, encompassing the entire San Bernardino Valley.
- 1845 – Agua Mansa founded on land donated by Don Juan Bandini from his Rancho Jurupa to a group of colonists from Abiquiú, New Mexico.
- 1848 – Treaty of Guadalupe Hidalgo cedes California to the United States
- 1851
  - Mormon colony founded on the land of the Rancho San Bernardino purchased from the Lugo family.
  - Jews arrive with the Mormon settlers. They establish the oldest Jewish cemetery in continuous use on the West Coast. Congregation Emanu El was later chartered in 1891.

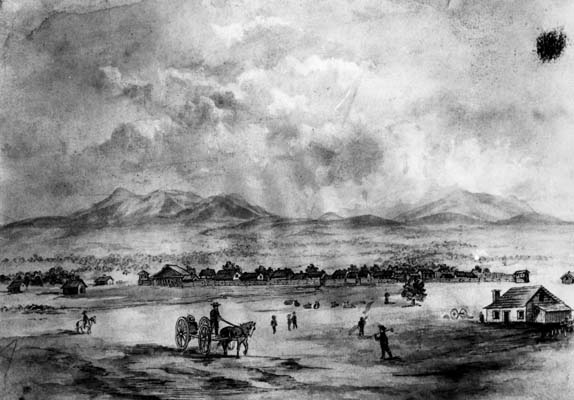
Drawing of San Bernardino, 1852

- 1852 – Colonel Henry Washington erects survey monument in San Bernardino Mountains, founds the San Bernardino Base and Meridian. The Base Line is along the street of the same name.
- 1854 – San Bernardino incorporated on April 13, 1854
- 1857 – Brigham Young recalls Mormons to Utah. San Bernardino disincorporated. The first orange trees are brought to the valley. The Fort Tejon earthquake ruptured the San Andreas Fault, the last major earthquake on the San Bernardino portion of the fault to this day.
- 1859 – San Bernardino County votes to secede from California to form the Territory of Colorado, voting 421–29 in favor of secession.
- 1862 – A flood causes the Santa Ana River to carry three times its usual volume, altering its banks, wiping out nearby Agua Mansa.
- 1863 - A smallpox plague from Los Angeles County hits San Bernardino. This epidemic caused severe mortality among the Native American population of Southern California, reducing them to a minority of the population.
- 1863 – 1864 Great Drought, destroys most of the cattle of the ranchos, ending the era of the great Californio ranchos.
- 1870 – Regional rival Riverside, California, formed by John W. North.
- 1873 – The Southern Pacific Railroad enters into negotiations with the City to build a railroad through town. Talks break down.
- 1874 – The first permanent court house is founded on Court Street near "E" Street.
- 1875 – The Southern Pacific reaches the valley but stops at Slover Mountain Colony. The station is named Colton after Southern Pacific Official David D. Colton, and will become the City of Colton.
- 1882 – Julia and Joseph Meyer arrive in the area today known as Verdemont in Northwestern San Bernardino, and eventually they will own 2,000 acres (8 km^{2}) which they use to grow wine grapes.
- 1883 – California Southern Railroad reaches San Bernardino on September 13. San Bernardino High School becomes the first high school in the county.
- 1885 – On November 9, 1885, the last spike is driven on the California Southern Railroad, linking San Bernardino to the Atlantic Pacific Railroad.
- 1886 – San Bernardino reincorporated. A passenger rail fare war erupts between Southern Pacific and Santa Fe dropping the price from $125 to $1. All of Southern California booms.
- 1890 – The sanitarium that later becomes Patton State Hospital is founded.
- 1893 – Rival city Riverside secedes from San Bernardino County and forms its own County, with the City of Riverside its county seat.
- 1894 – The Sun Newspaper begins publishing.
- 1901 – San Bernardino's first permanent City Hall is located on a Corner of Third and "D" Street.
- 1902 – San Bernardino Valley Traction Company forms to operate electric trolleys in and between Colton, San Bernardino, Redlands and Highland.
- 1905 – San Bernardino passes its first Charter. Harris Company opens inside a small dry goods store. It becomes a small regional department store until it merges with Gottschalks in the 1990s.
- 1911 – First National Orange Show held.
- 1923 – On July 22, a 6.0 M_{w} earthquake shook the Inland Empire area of Southern California with a maximum Mercalli intensity of VII (Very strong). At Redlands and San Bernardino, chimneys fell and buildings were damaged.
- 1925 – Future President Lyndon B. Johnson works as an elevator operator in the Platt Building in downtown San Bernardino
- 1926 – San Bernardino Valley College built.
- 1927 – The San Bernardino County Court House is built on the site of Fort San Bernardino, as Court Street is extended to Arrowhead.
- 1930 – San Bernardino's population grows to 37,481
- 1938 – A major flood from the mountains damages the city.
- 1940 – San Bernardino's population reaches 43,646
- 1941 – Dorothy Inghram becomes the first African American teacher in San Bernardino, and later the first African American school administrator in the state.
- 1942 – San Bernardino Air Material Command opens (later Norton Air Force Base).
- 1944
  - San Bernardino native Leland Francis Norton was killed in action over Amiens, France on May 27, 1944. He was dive-bombing a target in an A-20 attack/bomber.
  - Lopez v. Seccombe: desegregated city parks and recreational facilities, specifically the Perris Hill Plunge & Pool. This set the precedent for other desegregation cases like Mendez v. Westminster (1947) & Brown v. Board of Education (1954).
- 1947 – San Bernardino Air Depot deactivated, Congressman Harry Shepard gets it reactivated and expanded.
- 1948 – On December 12, brothers Richard and Maurice McDonald convert their "barbecue" restaurant on "E" Street into a fast food restaurant, McDonald's, by introducing their Speedee Service System. Glen Bell, inspired by their success, opens Bell's Hamburgers on the corner of Oak and Mount Vernon Avenues. Bell would later open Taco Tia at Base Line and Acacia in 1954, El Taco, and in 1962, Taco Bell in Downey, California.
- 1950 – Norton Air Force Base named after Leland Norton. San Bernardino's population reaches 73,827.
- 1951 – San Bernardino's first ice hockey team, the Shamrocks, is founded by Fontana resident Bill Gray, Sr. Composed mostly of young Northern airmen stationed at Norton AFB and workers at Kaiser Steel, the team plays its home games on the ice rink at the National Orange Show's Swing Auditorium.
- 1952 – Neal Baker, a friend of Glen Bell's and an admirer of the McDonald's, opens the first Baker's Drive Thru. This local chain now has 35 stores in the Inland Empire.
- 1961 – Dick and Mac McDonald sell Ray Kroc business rights to their restaurants for $2.7 million; they retain the original McDonald's as "The Big M." Kroc opens a McDonald's across the street. Today, both restaurants have been demolished, though a McDonald's museum exists at the original site (within the Civic Light Opera building built in the 1970s). The museum is run by Albert Okura, founder of the local chicken chain, Juan Pollo.
- 1965 – California State University, San Bernardino founded.
- 1970 – W.R. "Bob" Holcomb is first elected mayor. He would serve until 1985, and then again from 1989 to 1993.
- 1973 – A new city hall is opened on what was once the middle of Third Street between "D" and "E". This modern, eight level, glass and concrete building, designed by Gruen and Associates is the current seat of City government.
- 1976 – Omnitrans is formed, replacing the San Bernardino Transit System.
- 1978 – The Roman Catholic Diocese of San Bernardino is founded, covering San Bernardino and Riverside Counties, with its cathedral at Our Lady of the Rosary Cathedral in San Bernardino on Arrowhead Avenue at 25th Street.
- 1979–1980 – San Bernardino City Unified School District was forced to integrate.
- 1980 – Starting on November 24, and raging for six days, the Panorama Fire scorches 24,000 acres (97 km^{2}), left four dead, destroyed 284 homes, and damaged 49 others. Many city firefighters lost their homes to this devastating firestorm. Low interest FEMA loans (at a time with record high mortgage interest rates) allowed most victims to rebuild and even expand their homes. The [Census] counts 118,794 residents.
- 1985 – Norman F. Feldheym Library is dedicated. It is named after Rabbi Norman F. Feldheym, a prominent local leader who sat on the Library Board of Trustees for many years, among other civic accomplishments. Evlyn Wilcox is elected the first female mayor. The County Government Center (nicknamed the "Taj Mahal") opens at Fourth Street and Arrowhead Avenue, just north of the courthouse.
- 1987 – Professional (Single-A) baseball arrives when a team from Ventura, California, moves to Fiscalini Field in Perris Hill Park and is renamed the San Bernardino Spirit. James F. Penman is first elected as City Attorney, replacing Ralph Prince, who had been City Attorney since the 1950s.
- 1989 – San Bernardino train disaster: Southern Pacific Railroad freight train derails, killing four on Duffy Street. Days later, the Cal-Nev gasoline pipeline ruptures and ignites at the same location from damage sustained in the derailment cleanup. The Miss USA Pageant is held in San Bernardino on July 25, and televised on CBS. Seeking free airtime, the City invests in an 800 number, which CBS does not show on the air. W.R. "Bob" Holcolmb, after four years out of power, is re-elected mayor.
- 1990 – San Bernardino's population reaches 164,164.
- 1994 – Norton Air Force Base closed by decree of President William Jefferson Clinton.
- 1996 – San Bernardino Stadium (renamed Arrowhead Credit Union Park in 2003) is opened with the San Bernardino Stampede (formerly the San Bernardino Spirit) baseball club as its lead tenant. This stadium on South E Street replaced Fiscalini Field in Perris Hill Park as the home of the minor league baseball team. (They are later renamed the Inland Empire 66ers).
- 1997 – Mayor Judith Valles (Smith) is elected as mayor. She is the first Latino elected mayor in the city's history.
- 1999 – On January 31, the Harris' Department Store on E Street closes. George Brown, Jr., (D-Colton) the area's long-time representative in the United States House of Representatives dies in office.
- 2000 – In December, the city closes the Cypress Inn mobile home park off of Mount Vernon Avenue in the city's Westside. The park is closed by the city's Fire Prevention Unit because of life safety issues involving a gas leak and illegal/unsafe electrical hook-ups. The park is largely inhabited by monolingual Spanish speakers. The city, using money set aside for redevelopment, relocates the park's inhabitants to local motels. One resident, Valente Duran, complains about the treatment by the City. He says "In Mexico, they treat us better than here." San Bernardino City Attorney James F. Penman writes Valente Duran a letter in English and in Spanish that says in part "The people of this City have no desire to deprive you or your family of what you may believe would be better treatment by the government of Mexico. Therefore, in substitution for the housing, food, and other assistance the City of San Bernardino is voluntarily providing, we want to give you the option of continuing to receive this assistance or accepting our offer to arrange and pay for transportation for you and your family, one way, to Mexico." The letter causes a political firestorm.
- 2001 – Mayor Judith Valles is elected for a second term, running unopposed. Local newspapers allege this is a first in city history, but it is probably unlikely that someone ran against Apostle Amasa M. Lyman in 1854.
- 2003 – On October 25, 2003, the Old Fire (also known as the Old Waterman Canyon Fire), started by arson, destroys hundreds of structures in the foothills and in Del Rosa before heading into the San Bernardino Mountains. Many San Bernardino City Fire Department firefighters were battling the Grand Prix Fire (which at the time was largely in Fontana and Rancho Cucamonga) at the time, reducing the City's full resource response. Two City firefighters lost their homes to the Old Fire. The hills denuded, floods devastate the KOA campground just outside the city limits on Christmas Day and the manager, Jan Bradley, is killed.
- 2006 – Judge Patrick "Pat" J. Morris wins a mayoral run-off against City Attorney James "Jim" Frank Penman. On March 4, 2006, thousands of concertgoers start a riot at the Orange Show after a concert (see San Bernardino punk riot).
- 2012 – City goes bankrupt.
- 2015 – 14 people are killed and 22 others injured in a terrorist attack at Inland Regional Center.

== See also ==
- Bibliography of California history
- Timelines of other cities in the Southern California area of California: **Anaheim
  - Bakersfield
  - Long Beach
  - Los Angeles
  - Riverside
  - San Diego
  - Santa Ana
- Guachama Rancheria
