= Politana, California =

Spanish settlement in California

Coordinates: 34°04′53″N 117°18′18″W

Politana or Apolitana was the first Spanish settlement in the San Bernardino Valley of California. It was established in 1810 as a mission chapel and supply station by the Mission San Gabriel at the rancheria of the Guachama Indians who lived on the bluff that is now known as Bunker Hill, near Lytle Creek. Besides the Guachama, it was also at various times the home for colonists from New Mexico and Cahuilla people. Its most prominent landmark today is the St. Prophet Elias Greek Orthodox Church on Colton Avenue, just southwest of the Inland Center Mall, in San Bernardino, California.

The site is said to be named for a "faithful Indian convert, Hipolito." The identification of Politana as the location of the 1810 chapel and Guachama rancheria has been disputed by some historians, with claims it was only the name of a later, 1840s settlement.

== History ==
In 1810, the Mission San Gabriel established a chapel dedicated to San Bernardino, and a supply station for travelers coming across the desert from Yuma on the Sonora to Monterey road, at the Guachama rancheria near the place now known as Bunker Hill, between Urbita Springs and present day Colton. The location was chosen for the abundant springs in the vicinity. When the adobe buildings were completed the padres and Tongva laborers returned to San Gabriel Mission, leaving the chapel, station, and a large quantity of supplies in the charge of Mission Indian soldiers, under command of the Indian chief Hipolito. The Mission Indians rancheria (settlement) here took its name from him, and became known as Politana. During the next two years the missionary padres made frequent visits to the chapel, the Serrano Indians were friendly, and many of them went through Indian reductions into Christianity. Grain was planted and the settlement seemed successful.

In 1812, known in Alta California history as "the year of earthquakes" (el año de los temblores), frequent earthquakes were felt in the rancheria area. The hot springs of the valley increased in temperature, and a new hot mud spring (cienegata) appeared near Politana that came to be called Urbita Springs. The mud spring was used by Spanish missionaries for religious ceremonies, and became regarded as a medicinal spring by them. These practices aroused fears in the Serrano peoples about the superstitious activities. Hoping to allay their fears the missionaries buried the mud spring with earth. However this did not work.

The Serrano believed it was the manifestation of anger of a powerful spirit displeased at the presence of the Spanish and converts among them. To appease this spirit and avert further displeasure, they attacked the Politana rancheria, massacred most of the Mission Indians, and destroyed the buildings.

Several years later, the Serrano and Mountain Cahuilla rebuilt the Politana rancheria, and in 1819 invited the missionaries to return to the valley. They did and established the San Bernardino de Sena Estancia. Serrano and Cahuilla people inhabited Politana until long after the 1830s decree of secularization and the 1842 inclusion into the Rancho San Bernardino land grant.

== Rancho San Bernardino ==
Antonio Maria Lugo established Rancho San Bernardino on the former Mission San Gabriel property in the 1830s. By offering land, he convinced a group of settlers from Abiquiu, New Mexico to settle on the rancho at Politania and defend it against Indian raiders and outlaws preying on the herds of the Ranchos in Southern California. These emigrants first colonized Politana on the Rancho San Bernardino in 1842. Don Lorenzo Trujillo brought the first colony of settlers from New Mexico to settle on land provided by the Lugos about one half mile south of the Indian village of La Politana. These colonists included William Workman, John A. Rowland (later owners of Rancho La Puente) and Benjamin Davis Wilson. After remaining about two years at La Politana, Don Lorenzo, and four other families of colonists were persuaded move to 2,000 acres of land on the east side of the Santa Ana River, on the northern boundary of the Rancho Jurupa offered to them by Don Juan Bandini. This village was known as "La Placita de los Trujillos", later called La Placita.

In 1843 a second party of colonists, commanded by Don Jose Tomas Salazar, arrived at La Politana. Among the settlers of this second colony were Louis Rubidoux and Christobal Slover, both married to Mexican women. In 1845, the Salazar colonists too moved to the Santa Ana River, one mile northeast of La Placita and there founded the village known as Agua Mansa.

To replace the New Mexicans as guardians of their herds, the Lugos brought Mountain Cahuilla tribesmen under their leader, Juan Antonio, to settle in Politana. They remained there until 1851, when they killed all but one of the Irving Gang in San Timoteo Canyon. These were American brigands that had raided the Ranchos in the valley and were hunted down on orders of the local justice of the peace. Due to the ill feeling among the American population resulting from this incident, shortly afterward the Cahuilla moved east to a new rancheria at Saahatpa in the San Gorgonio Pass near Banning, California.

== Decline of Politana ==
A few Indians remained at the rancheria of Politana when American colonization began. However it was the burial place of the Christian Indians of San Bernardino Valley. This cemetery was a sacred spot, used by the Indians of the whole valley until the graves were leveled and the land placed under cultivation. As the country was settled, the Indians decreased in numbers and dispersed, especially during the smallpox epidemic of 1862–63. The few remaining habitations fell into decay and vanished. Its cemetery became an orange grove in the late 19th century and now the site is an open lot west of the St. Prophet Elias Greek Orthodox Church on Colton Avenue, just southwest of the Inland Center Mall. There is now no trace of the rancheria or cemetery, except for occasional finds of pieces of tile or pottery.

== De Sienna Mission Hot Springs ==
The springs may have been "created" by the action of 1812 San Juan Capistrano earthquake and/or 1812 Ventura earthquake 13 days later.

Frank R. McDonald opened the De Sienna Mission Hot Springs resort on the site in 1929. The "plunge" offered black and white sulphur water baths. Other amenities including a mini golf course and "picnic grounds". McDonald constructed a three-story tower as an attraction on the site; "the ground floor had a museum of Indian artifacts". The bath house and tower were meant to be part of a much larger development. The tower was by used as an enemy-aircraft lookout by civil defense during World War II. The bathhouse may have survived until the 1950s. The tower was demolished in 1976.

De Sienna's main competition in the area was Urbita Springs, site of the Urbita Lake Railway and since 1966, site of Inland Center mall.

== See also ==
- Where was Politana? by Arda M. Haenszel
