= Guachama Rancheria =

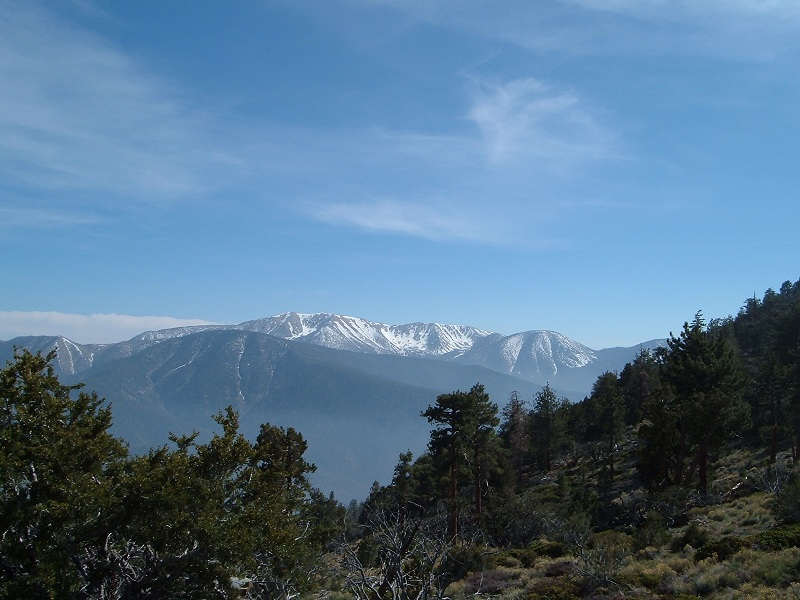
- San Bernardino mountains above Redlands

- Location within California
- 34°03′23″N 117°14′17″W
- Location: Loma Linda, California

California Historical Landmark
- Designated: March 29, 1933
- Reference no.: 95

Kaawchama (Hispanicized to Guachama), alternatively referred to as Wa’aachnga ("plenty to eat"), was a significant Tongva village in the San Bernardino Valley located in what is now west Redlands, California. The village became referred to by the Spanish as the Guachama Rancheria in 1810 after a supply station was constructed at the village for Mission San Gabriel, which then became part of Rancho San Bernardino following the secularization of the missions in 1833.

== History ==
=== Gabrieleno Village ===
Kaawchama was located in the far eastern reaches of Tovaangar, or the Gabrieleno world. Various maps of Gabrieleno villages place it as the easternmost village of the Gabrieleno. The Mohave Trail connected Kaawchama to a vast trade network that extended from villages in southern California to the Colorado River.

When Mission San Gabriel was constructed by the Spanish colonizers in 1771, Kaawchama was located fifty miles east from the mission, yet soon began to be eyed as a potential outpost for the mission.

The village had been known by Spanish missionaries since the 1770s, yet no European structure had been constructed in the area. This was noted as a problem by the missionaries, who would travel the Mohave Trail without a place to refill supplies: "As travel over this road increased it was arranged to establish a supply station at some intermediate point between the Sierras on the north and the mission."

In 1810, approximately one-thousand Mohave raiders traveled through the village, initially with plans to attack Mission San Gabriel. However, the raid party decided against destroying the mission and instead captured three thousand sheep.

On May 10, 1810, Francisco Dumetz, a padre of Mission San Gabriel, came to the village of Kaawchama, and established the sought after supply station at the village:

They found an ideal location, in a place called Guachama, which means "plenty to eat." The valley was well watered and luxuriant with springtime verdure. The Guachama Indians had here a populous rancheria. A number of other rancherias were scattered about the valley, each bearing a name significant of the place it was situated. Many of the names were retained by settlers at a later day and applied to ranches granted by the government.

=== Guachama Rancheria ===
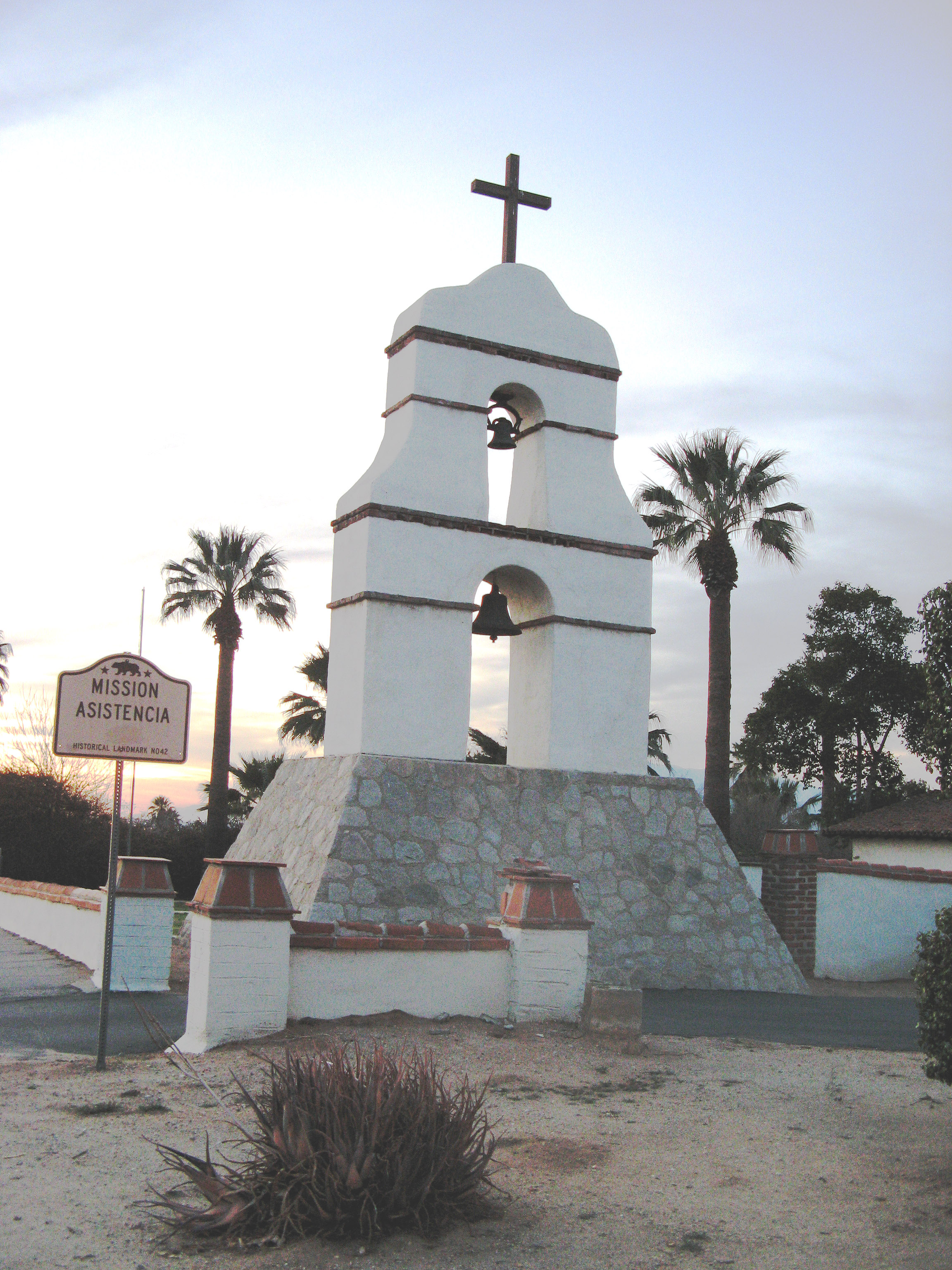
The San Bernardino de Sena Estancia's "bell wall" was designed after the campanario at Mission San Antonio de Pala

It was believed by some authorities that after 1812, many of the Guachama, who were associated with the Gabrieleno people, "migrated back to Los Angeles," which opened the settlement to be occupied by the Cahuilla and Serrano.

Rancho San Bernardino became the headquarters of farming and cattle ranching in the area. The Guachama were taught to farm and care for cattle. Zanja trenches were made to bring water to more farm land. Guachama Rancheria from this time was called San Bernardino. In 1819 it was officially renamed San Bernardino Rancho of the Mission San Gabriel. Due to flooding from San Timoteo Creek, the mission was moved to higher ground in 1830. Some ruins remain at the site.

=== Rancho San Bernardino ===
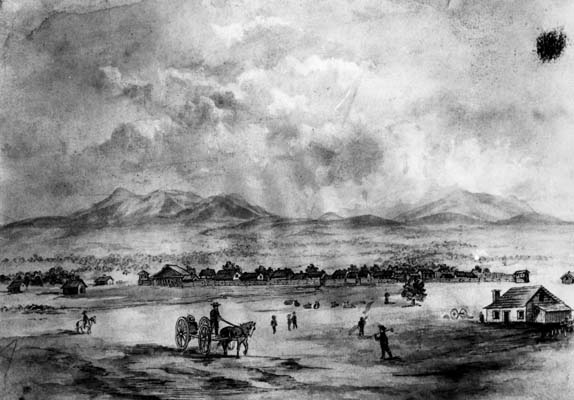
Drawing of San Bernardino, 1852

In 1842, Mexico Governor Juan B. Alvarado gave a Mexican land grant to José del Carmen Lugo, José María Lugo, Vicente Lugo, and Diego Sepulveda, forming the Rancho San Bernardino. The grant covered 35,509-acre (143.70 km^{2}) of what today is part of the San Bernardino valley, San Bernardino, Fontana, Rialto, Redlands and Colton.

=== Memorialization ===
In 1933, the site was designated a California Historic Landmark (No.95), listed as Guachama Rancheria, on March 29, 1933. A marker was placed at 25894 Mission Road, Loma Linda, California. Translated from the Tongva name, "Guachama" means a "place where there is plenty to eat". There were fresh springs and creeks in the area, thus providing ample food. Marker at the site reads:

- NO. 95 GUACHAMA RANCHERIA - Guachama Rancheria, renamed San Bernardino on May 20, 1810, by Francisco Dumetz, became the San Bernardino Rancho of the Mission San Gabriel in 1819. The adobe administration building stood 70 yards north of this spot, an enramada served as the chapel, and a zanja was constructed to bring water from the mountains for irrigation. Control by mission fathers ended in 1834." Erected 1932 by Arrowhead Chapter Daughters of the American Revolution.

== See also ==
- Putiidhem
- Wá’peat
- Yaanga
- History of San Bernardino, California
- Timeline of San Bernardino, California history
- San Bernardino de Sena Estancia
- California Historical Landmarks in San Bernardino County, California
