= Bunker Hill (San Bernardino, California) =

Bunker Hill is a bluff in the City of San Bernardino in San Bernardino County, California. Bunker Hill trends northwest–southeast from 34°05′19″N 117°18′18″W through the campus of San Bernardino Valley College on the northeast to 34°04′46″N 117°18′6″W where it overlooks Lytle Creek on the southeast. Its tallest point is over 1080 feet at the top of a ridge marking its southwest facing edge at 34°05′04″N 117°18′33″W the top of a ridge, just south of Grant Avenue, that overlooks the southern parking lot of the college. Bunker Hill gives its name to the neighborhood of the city of San Bernardino in the vicinity of this feature.

== History ==
Bunker Hill was the location of Politana, the first Spanish settlement in the San Bernardino Valley. Politana was a mission chapel and supply station of the Mission San Gabriel at the rancheria of the Guachama Indians who lived on the bluff.

== Bunker Hill Groundwater Basin ==
The Bunker Hill feature marks the location and trend of a huge tilted section of underlying bedrock between the San Gabriel Mountains on the northwest and the mountains to the southeast, that forms the southwestern side of the Bunker Hill Groundwater Basin. This bedrock formation prevents the ground water in the basin from flowing away underground toward the Pacific Ocean. The water in the basin comes from rain and melting snow from the mountains surrounding it. The water from this basin supplies the water for the City of San Bernardino and 20 other local public and private water suppliers.
