= San Timoteo Canyon =

Landform in Riverside and San Bernardino Counties, California

Coordinates: 34°01′48″N 117°12′17″W

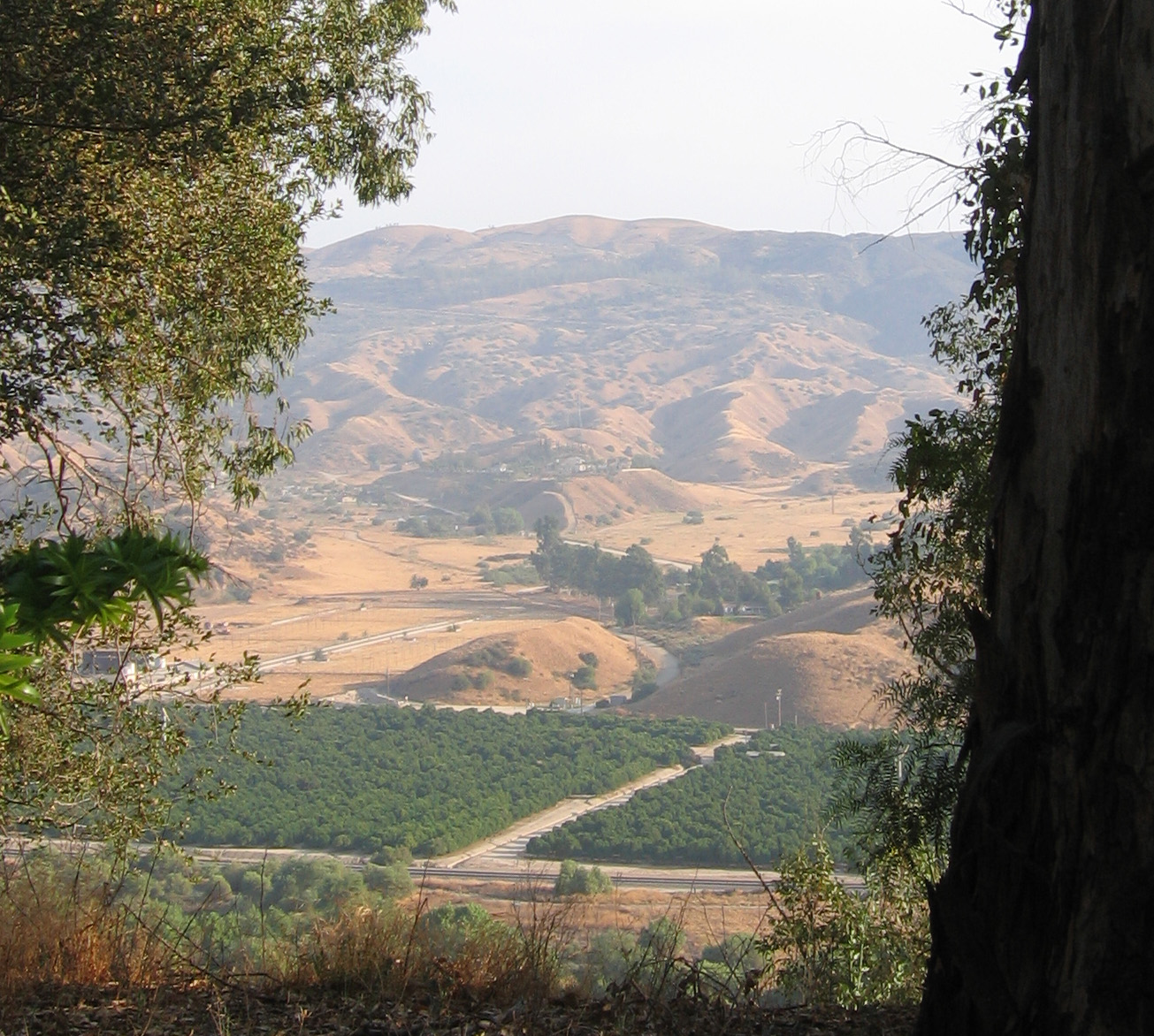
View from Redlands of orange groves in San Timoteo Canyon.

San Timoteo Canyon is a river valley canyon southeast of Redlands, in the far northwestern foothills of the San Jacinto Mountains in the Inland Empire region of Southern California.

== Geography ==
The canyon runs from its southern inflow mouth in Beaumont in Riverside County, in a northwest alignment, to its northern outflow mouth west of Redlands and east of Loma Linda in San Bernardino County.

San Timoteo Creek formed the canyon, and flows northwest through it to its confluence with the Santa Ana River, being a tributary of it. The creek drains the Banning Valley west of the San Gorgonio Pass water divide, and the watersheds of the San Bernardino and San Jacinto Mountains that feed into it.

== History ==
The canyon was part of the winter homeland of the Serrano people for thousands of years. There were hot springs in the area.

The San Bernardino de Sena Estancia was established in 1819 as a ranch outpost Mission San Gabriel Arcángel, for the grazing of cattle by the Mission Indians. The original buildings grew to include a chapel, tile kiln, lime kiln, and a grist mill.

The canyon was part of Rancho San Bernardino, the 1842 Mexican land grant by Alta California Governor Juan B. Alvarado to José del Carmen Lugo, José María Lugo, Vicente Lugo, and Diego Sepulveda.

=== Irving Gang, Cahuilla posse, and American militia ===
On the 27th day of May, 1851, Juan Antonio, the Californian Native American chief of the Mountain Cahuilla band, with a group of his tribesmen pursued and fought the Irving Gang of John "Red" Irving and his San Francisco and Sydney outlaws in San Timoteo Canyon. Irving's band of raiding thieves had robbed people and stolen property throughout the San Bernardino Valley, including on Rancho San Bernardino where Juan Antonio's Cahuilla village at Politana was located. Acting on the orders of the local Justice of the Peace, the Californio owner of the rancho and whose house the Irving Gang were robbing at the time, the Cahuilla attacked and pursued them into San Timoteo Canyon, where in a running fight they killed eleven of the twelve men in the gang after they refused to surrender. There were decades of precedent for the Mountain Cahuilla who working on the local ranchos, tracking and hunting down bandits and other tribe's raiders was a service they were requested for in the San Bernardino region, during the 1822–1846 Mexican rule in Alta California. With this 1851 order, they were still authorized to carry out legally requested local law enforcement actions, now within the year old U.S. state.

However some newly arrived American settlers to Southern California and the area resented the killing of "white men" by "indians" and mistook it to be the beginning of a Mission Indian uprising. A company of militia from the Presidio of San Diego was sent against the Cahuilla. At the time, present day San Bernardino and Riverside Counties were within San Diego County, and served by troops based at the presidio. Juan Antonio's Cahuilla band fled Politana, going to their homelands in the San Jacinto Mountains. The American leader of the militia, Major General Joshua Bean, discovered the truth about the events and with difficulty restrained his troops from attacking the Cahuilla, preventing a battle and massacre.

Closely following the outcome of the Irving Gang incident, in late 1851, Juan Antonio, his warriors and their families, moved eastward from Politana, toward the San Gorgonio Pass and settled in a valley which branched off to the north from San Timoteo Canyon, at a village named Saahatpa.

In November 1851, the Garra Revolt occurred, a conflict of the Yuma War. The Cupeño leader Antonio Garra attempted to bring Juan Antonio and the Mountain Cahuilla band into the Serrano, Cahuilla and Cupeño Indians independence revolt. The Garra Revolt was put an end by Juan Antonio, a new ally of the Americans, who arrested Antonio Garra and handed him over to American authorities.

=== American expansion ===
One of San Timoteo Canyon's more famous residents was the teenaged Wyatt Earp, whose family lived in the canyon from 1864 to 1868.

The canyon was used in 1877 by the Southern Pacific Railroad for its new southern transcontinental route's tracks into/out of the Los Angeles Basin and Southern California, to/from the eastern U.S.

For a time in the mid-1950s it was considered as one of three possible alignments for the path of Interstate 10 in California, as part of the new Interstate Highway System program, though the central route through Redlands was selected.

== Parks ==
=== San Timoteo Canyon State Park ===
San Timoteo Canyon State Park is in development for public access and recreation facilities, and is not yet open. In 2001 a portion of the canyon, through the efforts of the Riverside Land Conservancy and others, was protected for a regional park, and then came under management of the California State Parks department.

When the regional park opens, it will add some much-needed public open space for the fast-growing Inland Empire. The park's features will include: trails for hiking and horseback riding; the native flora and fauna of the canyon's varied habitats; and historical landmarks, including the San Timoteo Schoolhouse.

=== San Timoteo Canyon Schoolhouse ===
The San Timoteo Canyon Schoolhouse, a museum and park operated by the Riverside County Parks department, was built in 1883, and added to the National Register of Historic Places on January 19, 2001. It was acquired by Riverside County Parks from the Beaumont Unified School District in 1993, but was not opened to the public until after 2007, when a five-year restoration was completed.

== San Timoteo Formation ==
Part of the wider San Timoteo Formation in the Badlands, fossils from the Pliocene and early Pleistocene have been excavated in San Timoteo Canyon since the early 1900s.

=== El Casco Substation ===
In 2010, a construction crew found a deposit of Irvingtonian fossils dating back 1.4 million years ago in San Timoteo Canyon. The well-preserved natural cache contained nearly 1,500 bone fragments. They included those of: two species of sabretooth cats; ground sloths the size of a modern-day grizzly bear; two types of camels; and more than 1,200 bones from small rodents. Other finds include new species of deer, horse, and possibly llama.

== See also ==
- San Timoteo Creek
- Indigenous peoples of California
