= San Bernardino de Sena Estancia =

19th-century Catholic estancia in California

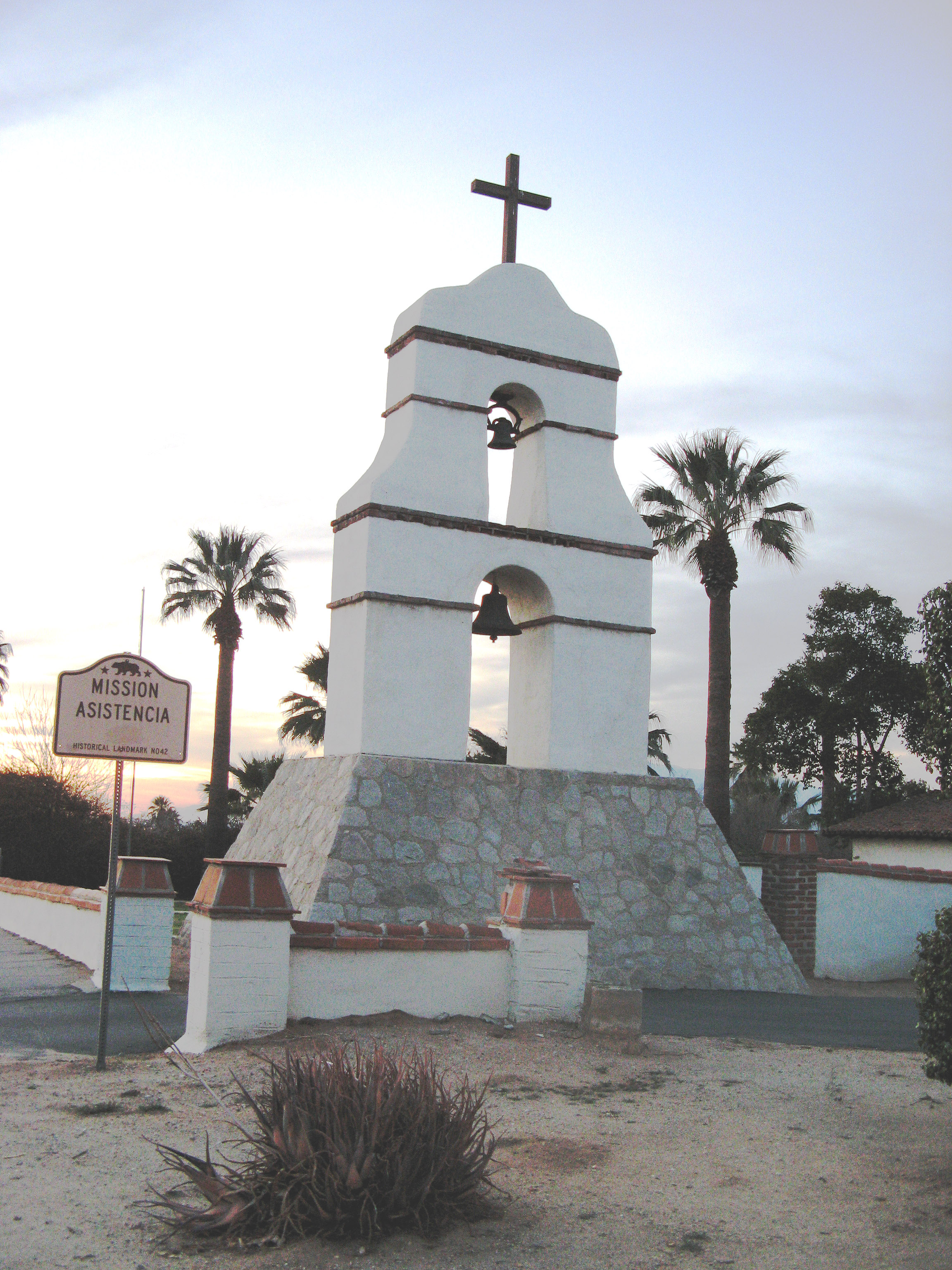
- The estancia's "bell wall" was designed after the campanario at Mission San Antonio de Pala.

- Location within southern California Location within California Location within the United States
- Location: Redlands, California
- Coordinates: 34°2′54.8″N 117°12′59.9″W
- Name as founded: Estancia de la Misión San Gabriel, Arcángel
- English translation: Station of Mission San Gabriel Arcángel
- Patron: Saint Bernardinus of Masa Marrittima, near Siena, Italy
- Nicknames: "The Place of Plenty to Eat and Drink"
- Founded: 1819
- Governing body: Redlands Conservancy
- Current use: Historic Site and Event Venue

California Historical Landmark
- Reference no.: #42

Website
- redlandsconservancy.org/the-asistencia/

The San Bernardino de Sena Estancia (also known as the San Bernardino Rancho or Asistencia) was a ranch outpost of Mission San Gabriel Arcángel in what is now Redlands, California, United States. It was built to graze cattle, and for Indian reductions of the Serrano people and Cahuilla people into Mission Indians. Over time, it fell into disrepair, until the early 20th century, when a new, larger structure was built as a museum. The new structure shares the same architectural style, but is not otherwise similar to the original buildings.

== 19th century ==
The estancia was established in 1819. A second estancia was established and built around 1830 at Politana rancheria, approximately 1 mile (1.6 km) from the original 1819 site. The Politana site of the San Bernardino de Sena Estancia is a California Historical Landmark. The California missions' lands were secularized in 1833–34. In 1842 Governor Juan B. Alvarado of Alta California issued a Mexican land grant for Rancho San Bernardino to José del Carmen Lugo, José Maria Lugo, Vincente Lugo, and their cousin Jose Diego Sepulveda. Included were all of the original asistencia buildings: the chapel, a tile kiln, a lime kiln, and a grist mill. In 1851 the property was subsequently sold to Charles C. Rich and Amasa Lyman, leaders of the San Bernardino settlement of the Church of Jesus Christ of Latter-day Saints, and occupied by Bishop Nathan C. Tenney from 1851 through 1859, when Dr. Ben Barton purchased it from the Mormons due to their return to Utah. Barton practiced medicine and resided on the property until 1867. Over time, materials were removed from the abandoned adobe structure, which fell into a state of ruin.

== 20th century ==
In 1925, the County of San Bernardino acquired the property from the Barton family. All remaining historic materials were salvaged, and construction of a new, six-room structure commenced in 1926 with later funding from the Works Progress Administration relief project (assisted by the San Bernardino County Historical Society).

Since funds weren't available to restore "mere" ranchos, a great deal of artistic license was taken in the design of the new, six-room structure (including exhibit space and a residence for the site manager), which replaced what was left of the original chapel building. Additionally, a freestanding campanario (bell wall) was constructed (similar to that at Mission San Antonio de Pala) even though none had existed previously. The restoration was completed in 1937, and the rebuilt structures were unveiled to the general public as "The Asistencia". The site was operated as a museum until 2018.

== Present day ==
Today the facility is known as the Asistencia, and is operated by the Redlands Conservancy. It was a branch of the San Bernardino County Museum until it was transferred to the nonprofit Redlands Conservancy in November, 2018. It is located at 26930 Barton Road, in Redlands. The reconstructed asistencia and rancho buildings are open for drop-in visitors Mondays and Wednesdays 10:00 a.m to 12:00 p.m. There is no staff at the facility full-time and the site is no longer operated as a museum. Other tour times may be available by appointment, and the chapel and courtyard are available as a site for weddings and other events.

== See also ==
- List of Spanish missions in California
- San Timoteo Canyon
- Guachama Rancheria

== Notes ==
=== References ===
- Ruscin, Terry (1999). Mission Memoirs. Sunbelt Publications, San Diego, CA. ISBN 0-932653-30-8.
