= Rancho San Bernardino =

Mexican land grant in modern day San Bernardino county, California

Coordinates: 34.090°N 117.300°W

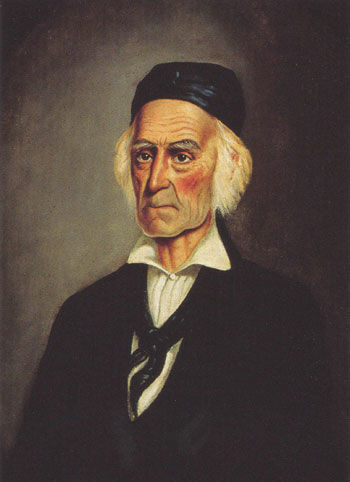
In 1839, Antonio María Lugo was granted the right to settle the San Bernardino Valley. In 1842, he convinced Governor Juan Bautista Alvarado to grant Rancho San Bernardino to his four heirs.

Rancho San Bernardino was a 35,509-acre (143.70 km^{2}) Mexican land grant in present-day San Bernardino County, California given in 1842 by Governor Juan B. Alvarado to José del Carmen Lugo, José María Lugo, Vicente Lugo, and Diego Sepulveda. The grant included a large part of the San Bernardino valley, and encompassed present-day San Bernardino, Fontana, Rialto, Redlands and Colton.

== History ==
In 1810, Padre Francisco Dumetz, a priest from Mission San Gabriel, toured the area and gave it the name San Bernardino. Later emissaries from the mission established the Rancho as headquarters of native farming activity called Guachama Rancheria and with other subsidiary farms such as with the Jumuba which established the site of Jumuba rancheria .

In January 1827, the exploring party of Jedediah Smith—first to reach California overland from the United States—spent several days in the area preparing for a return crossing of the Mojave Desert (having missed these settlements on the inbound journey)

After the Mexican secularization act of 1833 in 1841, Antonio Maria Lugo petitioned for a land grant in the name of three of his sons, José del Carmen Lugo, José Maria Lugo, Vicente Lugo, and José del Carmen's friend, Diego Sepulveda. In 1842, the eight square league Rancho San Bernardino was granted to Antonio Maria Lugo, his sons and his nephews, who grazed cattle in the area.

With the cession of California to the United States following the Mexican–American War, the 1848 Treaty of Guadalupe Hidalgo provided that the land grants would be honored. As required by the Land Act of 1851, a claim for Rancho San Bernardino was filed with the Public Land Commission in 1852, and the grant was patented to José del Carmen Lugo, José María Lugo, Vicente Lugo, and Diego Sepulveda in 1865.

In 1851, the Lugo family sold the Rancho to a group of almost 500 members of the Church of Jesus Christ of Latter-day Saints (LDS Church) led by Captain David Seely (later first stake president), Captain Jefferson Hunt and Captain Andrew Lytle, and included LDS Apostles Amasa M. Lyman and Charles C. Rich.

== See also ==
- History of San Bernardino, California
- Politana, California - Mission San Gabriel Chapel and first Spanish settlement in the area, later included in the Rancho land grant
- San Bernardino de Sena Estancia - Outpost of Mission San Gabriel, later included in the Rancho land grant
