= San Bernardino Valley =

Valley in California, United States

Coordinates: 34°4′N 117°17′W

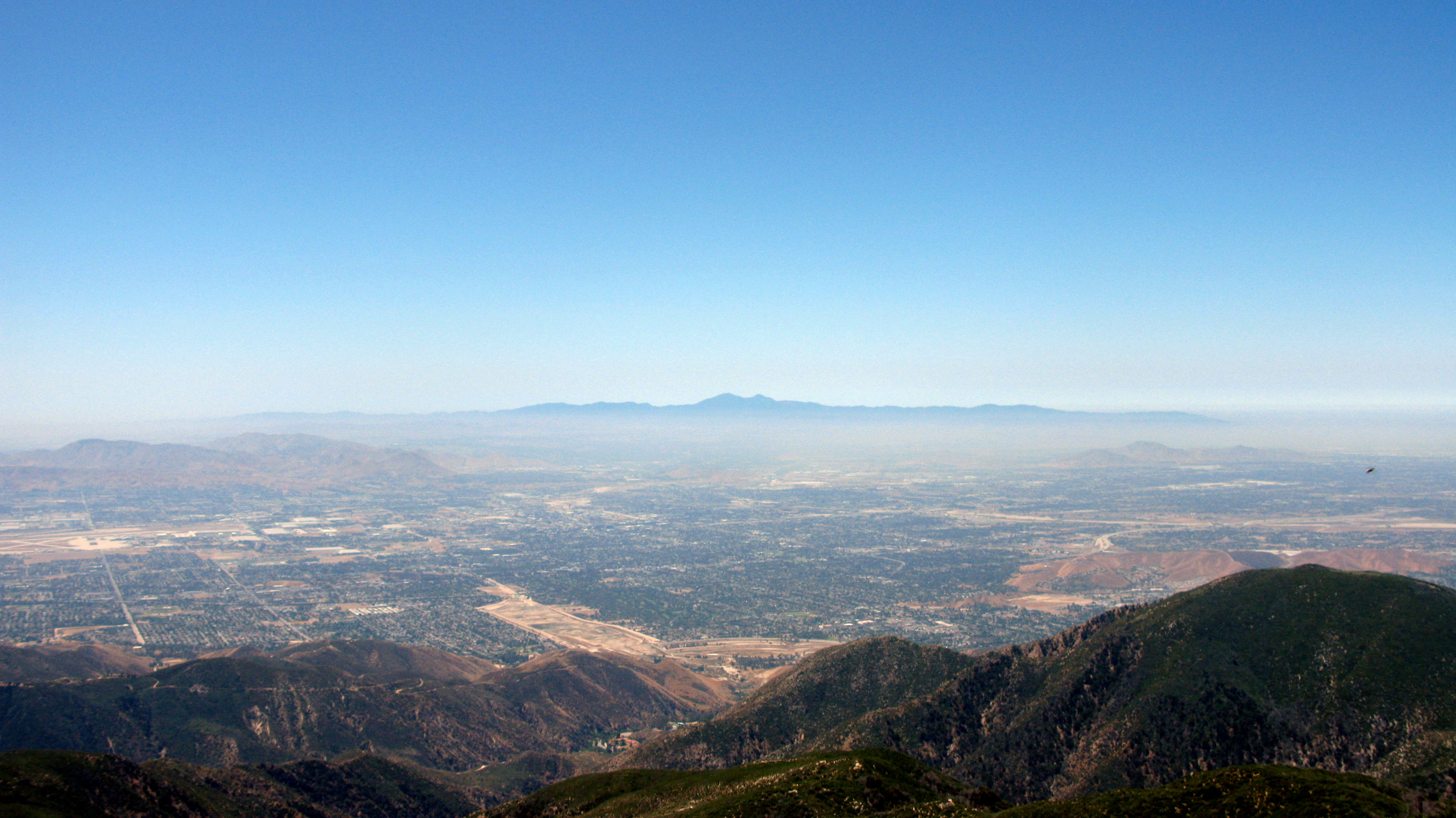
An elevated view of San Bernardino Valley, looking southwest toward the Santa Ana Mountains and South Coast beyond

The San Bernardino Valley (Spanish: Valle de San Bernardino) is a valley in Southern California located at the south base of the Transverse Ranges. It is bordered on the north by the eastern San Gabriel Mountains and the San Bernardino Mountains; on the east by the San Jacinto Mountains; on the south by the Temescal Mountains and Santa Ana Mountains; and on the west by the Pomona Valley. Elevation varies from 590 feet (180 m) on valley floors near Chino to 1,380 feet (420 m) near San Bernardino and Redlands. The valley floor is home to over 80% of the more than 4 million people in the Inland Empire region.

== History ==
The San Bernardino Valley was inhabited by Californian Native Americans, including the Serrano, Cahuilla, and Tongva tribes. The Mohave Trail, a trade route from the Mohave villages on the Colorado River that crossed the Mojave Desert from spring to spring and then followed the Mojave River upstream, entered the valley from the slopes of Monument Peak in the San Bernardino Mountains.

The Spanish missionaries established the Politana rancheria in the valley in 1810, an estancia, or ranch outpost, of Mission San Gabriel Arcángel. It was built to graze cattle, and for Indian Reductions of the Serrano people and Cahuilla people into Mission Indians. After being destroyed in a revolt, the estancia was later reestablished as San Bernardino de Sena Estancia in 1830. It is now a California Historical Landmark and museum in Redlands.

From 1829, the Old Spanish Trail from New Mexico to Alta California was established and entered the valley through Crowder Canyon and the lower canyon of Cajon Pass.

In 1841, Governor Juan B. Alvarado of Alta California issued a Mexican land grant for Rancho San Bernardino, which included most of the San Bernardino Valley, to José del Carmen Lugo, José Maria Lugo, Vincente Lugo, and their cousin Jose Diego Sepulveda. Included were all of the original estencia buildings: the chapel, a tile kiln, a lime kiln, and a grist mill.

By offering land, José Maria Lugo convinced a group of settlers from Abiquiu, New Mexico to settle on his rancho at Politania and defend against Indian raiders and outlaws preying on the herds of the Ranchos in Southern California. These emigrants first colonized Politana on the Rancho San Bernardino in 1842. Don Lorenzo Trujillo brought the first colony of settlers from New Mexico to settle on land provided by the Lugos about one half mile south of the Indian village of La Politana. Later they moved to found a new village known as "La Placita de los Trujillos", later called La Placita on the south side of the Santa Ana River.

American settlers in the region included soldiers from the Mormon Battalion in 1847, after the California Campaign of the Mexican–American War was won by the U.S. In 1851, the Lugo family sold Rancho San Bernardino to a group of almost 500 members of the Church of Jesus Christ of Latter-day Saints (Mormons) led by Captain David Seely (later first Stake President), Captain Jefferson Hunt, and Captain Andrew Lytle, and also included Apostles Amasa M. Lyman and Charles C. Rich.

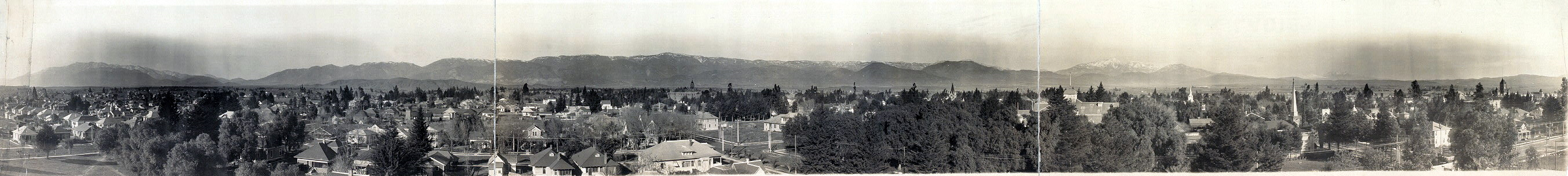
Panorama of the San Bernardino Valley in 1909.

== Geography ==
The San Bernardino Valley owes its existence to the convergence of several mountain ranges that feed into the Santa Ana River basin. This basin ultimately channels water to the Pacific Ocean via Riverside and Orange County. The valley connects several open space natural areas, mountains, and valley vistas. The San Bernardino Valley is surrounded by nature preserves, national forests, and recreational areas. Many people travel through the valley for a variety of outdoor mountain sports, including skiing, hiking, biking, and ballooning—in the mountain resorts of Crestline, Lake Arrowhead and Big Bear City.

Once part of U.S. Route 66, the San Bernardino Valley is now crossed by two Interstates. Interstate 15 enters the valley from the south, and exits on the north over Cajon Pass to the Mojave Desert. Interstate 10 enters the valley from Pomona in the west, and exits on the east over San Gorgonio Pass to the Colorado Desert and Coachella Valley.

Joan Didion, in her essay "Some Dreamers of the Golden Dream," describes the San Bernardino Valley as "...in certain ways an alien place: not the coastal California of the subtropical twilights and the soft westerlies of the Pacific but a harsher California, haunted by the Mojave just beyond the mountains, devastated by the hot dry Santa Ana wind that comes down through the passes at 100 miles an hour and works on the nerves."

=== Geology ===
The San Bernardino Valley encompasses one of two drainage basins of the Santa Ana River, the Inland Santa Ana Basin. Underneath the surface area of this drainage basin, which takes excess rainwater out of the valley, are several large ground water sub-basins, underlain by the impermeable granitic rock of the Perris Block, which capture water in aquifers underground. Designated ground water sub-basins include: Chino, Rialto-Colton, Riverside-Arlington, San Bernardino (Bunker Hill), Yucaipa and San Timoteo. The San Bernardino or Bunker Hill basin is bounded on the northeast by the San Bernardino Mountains, northwest by the San Gabriel Mountains, southwest by the San Timoteo badlands, and southeast by the Crafton Hills.

The San Andreas Fault and San Jacinto Fault zones enter the valley along the San Bernardino Mountains and San Jacinto Mountains, respectively. The two fault lines converge to less than 10 km apart in the city of San Bernardino, and less than 3 km in the northwestern part of the basin near the Cajon Pass.

=== Cities and communities ===
- Bloomington
- Colton
- Devore
- Fontana
- Grand Terrace
- Highland
- Loma Linda
- Muscoy
- Oak Glen
- Redlands
- Rialto
- San Bernardino
- Yucaipa

== Climate ==
Occasional January snowfall in the eastern San Bernardino Valley, Shandin Hills are visible in the background.

The climate is Mediterranean with cool-to-cold, wet, and in some cases snowy winters, and dry, hot summers. Usually the areas north of Interstate 210 and east of Interstate 215 see colder weather in the winter with occasional snowfall. Sage scrub and the Yucca plant are the predominant natural vegetation along washes and uplands; it intergrades with chaparral at elevations of 600 to 700 meters. Other vegetation consists of a patchwork of grasslands, riparian woodlands, and mixed hardwood forests, which border the valley in the mountains on the north and east. The Santa Ana winds blow into the valley from the Cajon Pass, which exits the valley's north end between the San Gabriel and San Bernardino mountains. At times, the seasonal Santa Ana winds are felt particularly strongly in the San Bernardino area as warm and dry air is channeled through nearby Cajon Pass during the autumn months. This phenomenon markedly increases the wildfire danger in the foothill, canyon, and mountain communities, which the cycle of cold, wet winters and dry summers helps create.

Monthly Normal High and Low Temperatures for San Bernardino
Month	Jan	Feb	Mar	Apr	May	Jun	Jul	Aug	Sep	Oct	Nov	Dec	Year
Avg high °F	70	71	74	79	85	95	102	103	100	86	78	70	84
Avg low °F	42	43	45	50	55	59	64	65	64	58	49	43	52

== Local attractions ==
The Route 66 Rendezvous in downtown San Bernardino attracts about half a million people annually from all over the world to watch California's largest classical car show. Although not in the valley, the San Bernardino Mountains attract a significant amount of tourism to the valley as people drive up to the local resorts, especially in the winter months. A famous ski resort in the area is Big Bear. Other famous mountain communities with large amounts of tourism include Lake Arrowhead, Big Bear Lake, and Crestline.

National forests surrounding the high valley include the Cleveland National Forest and the San Bernardino National Forest.

== Transportation ==
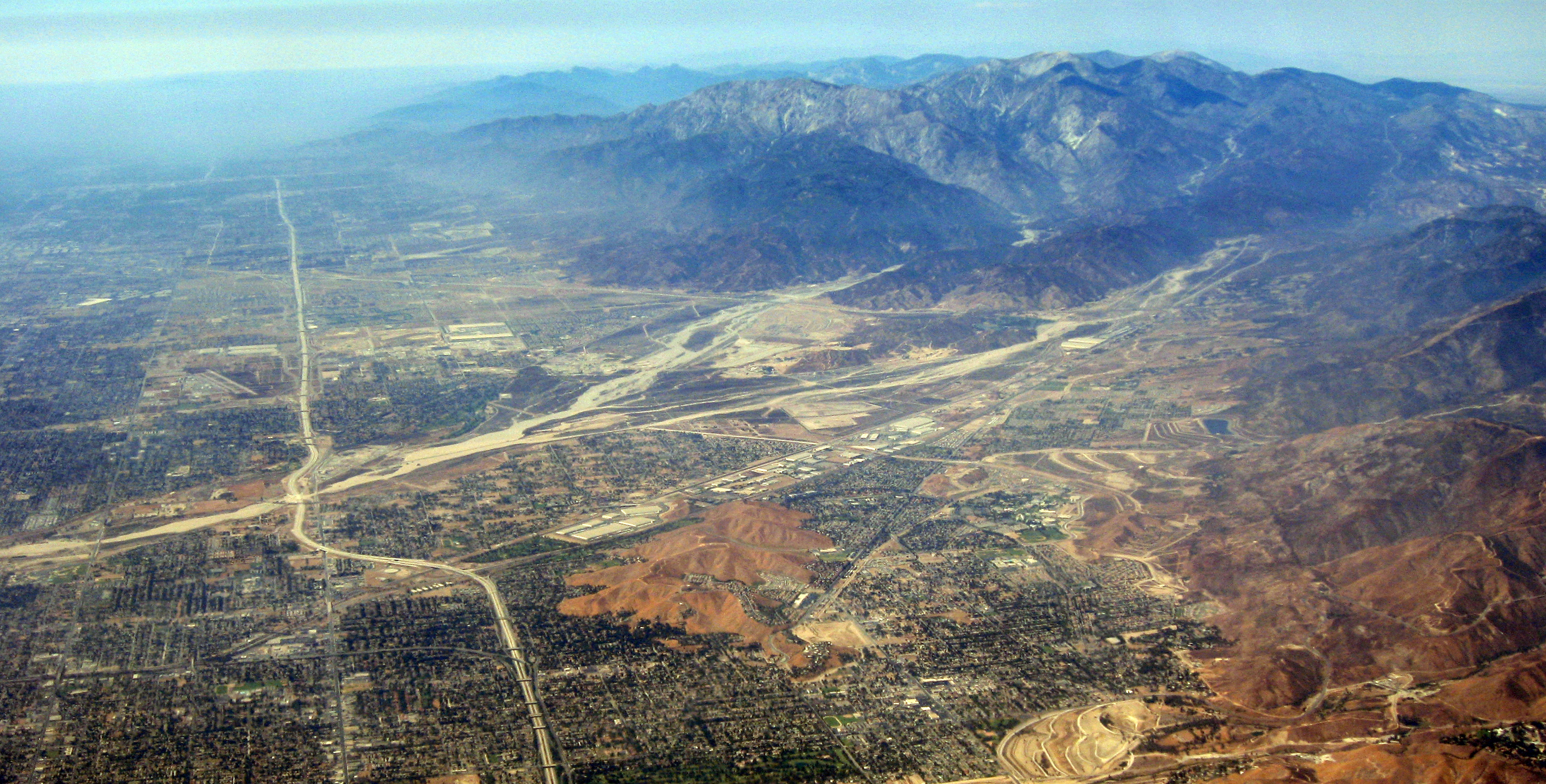
Junction of the San Gabriel and San Bernardino Mountains. The I-210 (Foothill Freeway) runs parallel, I-215 intersects leading to the Cajon Pass.

Despite a significant number of the cities and towns being "bedroom communities" with residents commuting to nearby Los Angeles or Orange counties for work, the San Bernardino Valley is an important transportation center to the state and country. Located approximately 70 miles east of the Ports of Los Angeles and Long Beach, a high percentage of goods destined for the rest of the country as well as items on their way out to the world pass through the valley, most of it on trains or trucks. Both Union Pacific and BNSF have tracks that run through the valley. In addition, BNSF has an intermodal transfer facility in San Bernardino. The valley is also crossed by two major interstates and their auxiliaries. Additionally, the communities in the mountains north of the valley are served by several state highways. Mass transit trains and buses both serve the valley. Also, goods and people movement by air is available via two commercial international airports as well as several general aviation air fields. The Greater San Bernardino Area, along with the rest of the Inland Empire, is ranked by Forbes magazine as one of the American's unhealthiest commutes.

=== Highways ===
Interstate Highways

- San Bernardino Freeway (Interstate 10)
- Interstate 15
- Foothill Freeway (Interstate 210)
- Interstate 215

State Highways

- State Route 18
- State Route 38
- State Route 60
- State Route 66
- State Route 138
- State Route 210
- State Route 259
- State Route 330

=== Mass transportation ===
Although a high percentage of valley residents drive their own cars, there are several available options for mass transit. The largest bus agency in the Greater San Bernardino area is Omnitrans, which covers virtually the entire valley. The Omni lines also meet lines for Foothill Transit and Riverside Transit Agency buses, providing connectivity to Riverside County and Los Angeles County.

The area is also served by Metrolink's San Bernardino Line and the Inland Empire–Orange County Line. These lines lead to the Los Angeles and San Diego metropolitan areas. It has Amtrak service at San Bernardino Santa Fe Depot and Ontario station (Amtrak).

=== Railroad ===
The two main railroads in the valley are Union Pacific (UP) and BNSF. Both have extensive yards in the valley and it is an important area for national movement of goods. UP tracks enter the valley from the south alongside the BNSF tracks in Colton/Grand Terrace. They then continue north until the Colton Crossing, where they then turn east. Union Pacific also has a second set of tracks that were the Southern Pacific tracks until they took over SP. These tracks enter the valley from the west through Ontario, passing alongside I-10 until Loma Linda, where they turn and exit the valley to the southeast. The BNSF track enters the valley from the south by Colton/Grand Terrace as well, but continues north at the Colton Crossing. It then enters the intermodal and car transfer yards, where it turns east for about one mile. It then turns north again, running alongside I-215 until it meets I-15 in Devore and exits the valley via the Cajon Pass. Union Pacific also has a line that exits the valley through the pass. The Colton Crossing, located in Colton, is the point where the tracks of the two companies cross.

=== Airports ===
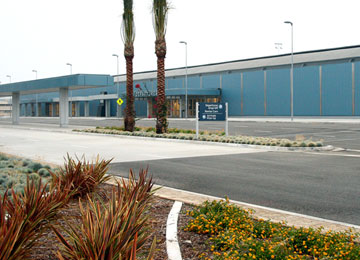
New San Bernardino International Airport Terminal

The San Bernardino Valley is served by two major commercial airports.

Airport	IATA code	ICAO code	County
Ontario International Airport	ONT	KONT	San Bernardino
San Bernardino International Airport	SBD	KSBD	San Bernardino

== See also ==
- Santa Ana Valley
- Inland Empire
- Greater Los Angeles Area
- Southern California
