= Lugo family of California =

Californio politicians and land owners

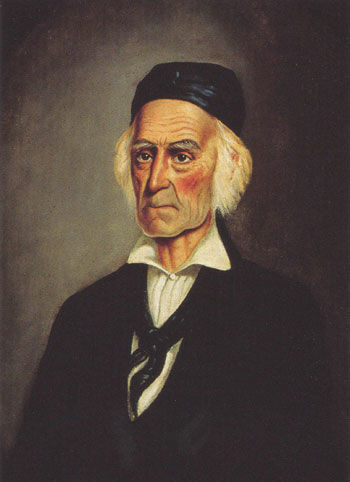
In 1839, Antonio María Lugo was granted Rancho San Bernardino and Rancho Santa Ana del Chino. On Rancho San Antonio he built Casa de Rancho San Antonio.

The Lugo family of California were prominent during the periods of Spanish and Mexican rule. They were among the early colonists who became known as Californios.

== Francisco Salvador Lugo ==
Francisco Salvador Lugo (1740–1805), born in Sinaloa, New Spain, came to Las Californias in 1774. He was a soldier in the province and was stationed in northern California until 1781. Next he was assigned as part of the founding of the Pueblo de Los Angeles. Francisco Lugo was one of the soldiers who escorted the Los Angeles Pobladores (farming families and colonists) in 1781 from northern Mexico into California. His name is listed on the plaque of those present at the founding of Los Angeles on September 4, 1781. Lugo married Juana María Martínez y Vianazul. Together they had nine children: Rosa María de Lugo (1761–1797), María Tomasa Ygnacia Lugo Martínez (1763–1816), Salvador Lugo (1766–1784), Gerónimo Teodoro Lugo (1773–?), José Ignacio de Lugo (1775–1800), María Antonia Isabel Lugo (1776–1855), Antonio María Lugo (1778–1860), Juan María Alejandro de Lugo (1780–1830), and María Ygnacia de Lugo (1783–1798).

== Antonio Maria Lugo ==
Antonio Maria Lugo (1778–1860) was born at Mission San Antonio de Padua in present-day Jolon, California, the seventh son of Francisco Salvador Lugo. After 17 years of service at the Presidio of Santa Barbara, in 1810 Corporal Lugo received his discharge and settled with his family in the Pueblo de Los Angeles. Antonio Lugo was granted the Spanish concession Rancho San Antonio in 1810, which was confirmed in 1838 by Mexican governor Juan Alvarado. In 1816, he served as the alcalde (municipal magistrate) of Los Angeles. In 1841, Lugo was granted Rancho Santa Ana del Chino by governor Alvarado. On Rancho San Antonio he built Casa de Rancho San Antonio the oldest home in Los Angeles County, California.

Antonio and his wife Maria de Los Dolores Dominguez Lugo had five sons: José del Carmen, José Maria, Felipe, José Antonio, and Vicente Lugo (namesake of the Lugo Adobe); and 3 daughters: Vicenta Perez, Maria Antonia Yorba, and María Merced Lugo. Maria married Stephen Clark Foster, the first American mayor of Los Angeles after the Mexican–American War.

== José del Carmen Lugo ==
José del Carmen Lugo (1813 – c. 1870) was a major 19th-century Californio landowner in Southern California.

He was born in 1813 at the Pueblo de Los Angeles, in Spanish colonial Alta California, then a province of the Viceroyalty of New Spain. José del Carmen Lugo was the eldest son of Antonio Maria Lugo.

=== Mexican period ===
José del Carmen Lugo, in a joint venture with his brothers José María and Vicente Lugo and cousin Diego Sepúlveda, began colonizing the San Bernardino Valley and adjacent Yucaipa Valley. The land covered more than 250,000 acres (1,012 km^{2}) in the present-day Inland Empire. Their colony charter was approved by the Mexican government in 1839. The valley was plagued by robberies and frequent raids by California Indians resisting loss of their homeland. Many would-be colonizers would stay only for short periods of time. The Lugo families became strong allies with the Mountain Band of Cahuilla Indians led by Chief Juan Antonio.

In 1842, the Lugo family bought the San Bernardino Asistencia, a former "sub-mission" of Mission San Gabriel. The adobe buildings were in disrepair. Lugo made repairs and soon he and his wife and two daughters moved into the asistencia.

By 1842, the Mexican governorship of California was about to change. To protect their land, the Lugo family applied for and received the Rancho San Bernardino Mexican land grant of 35,509 acres (144 km^{2}).

Mexican–American War

During the Mexican–American War, Lugo led a Californio militia. In December 1846, he was ordered to punish a band of Luiseño Indians in retaliation for the Pauma Massacre. His militia forces, together with allied Cahuilla, killed 33–40 Luiseño in the Temecula Massacre to avenge the deaths of 11 Californio lancers. The latter were killed for stealing horses from the Luiseño.

He was the leader of Californio forces during the Battle of Chino and the Temecula Massacre. By January 1847, he was placed in charge of the Chino prisoners by General José María Flores. Lugo escorted the prisoners to the Rancho Santa Ana del Chino and released them.

In March 1847, he met with the American John Charles Fremont in Los Angeles. Fremont requested that Lugo round up as many of Flores's abandoned horses as possible. Lugo rounded up about 60 horses between Los Angeles and San Bernardino.

=== U.S. period ===
The United States won the Mexican–American War and annexed California in 1848. In May 1849, U.S. military Governor Richard Barnes Mason appointed Lugo as the first Mexican-Californio mayor of Los Angeles after U.S. control began. He served after American Stephen Clark Foster (1848 – mid-1849), and before Alpheus P. Hodges (mid-1850 – 1851).

In August 1849 he was elected Justice of the Peace of Los Angeles and served until January 1850.

In 1851, Lugo sold Rancho San Bernardino to Amasa M. Lyman and Charles C. Rich, apostles of the Church of Jesus Christ of Latter-day Saints. The sale was finalized in 1852, although Lugo still had to defend his previous ownership of Rancho San Bernardino with the California Land Commission. Lugo's fortunes changed for the worse in later years. In 1854, he signed a note at five percent interest per month, compounded monthly, and mortgaged all of his property, including his home in Los Angeles. He lost his house and his land in Los Angeles to cover the note.

José del Carmen Lugo died in poverty in 1890.

== Felipe Lugo ==
Felipe Lugo was baptized on August 6, 1807, at Mission San Gabriel. He married Maria "Pancha" Perez and they were parents to as many as 16 children. He died on May 9, 1885, at Rancho San Antonio and is buried at Old Calvary Cemetery in Los Angeles.

Rancho Potrero de Felipe Lugo is named for him.

== See also ==
- 19th century in Los Angeles
- List of Californios people
- History of San Bernardino, California
- Ranchos of Los Angeles County, California
- Ranchos of San Bernardino County, California
- Lugo Adobe (Don Vicente Lugo home)
