= Isaac Slover =

American fur trader

- Born: 1780
- Died: October 30, 1854 (aged 73–74)

Isaac Slover (c. 1780– October 30, 1854) was an American 19th century fur trader. He was one of the first American trappers officially allowed into New Mexico, as part of the Glenn-Fowler Expedition of Hugh Glenn and Jacob Fowler. He was one of the first trappers to take up formal residence at Taos, New Mexico. Slover is known for his association with many other trappers in the American Southwest, including Ewing Young and William Wolfskill working the tributaries of the Colorado River in 1824, and with James Ohio Pattie and his father Sylvester Pattie on the Gila River and Lower Colorado River in 1828. Seeking food and water they cached their furs and went west to Baja California where they were arrested and imprisoned at San Diego from late 1828 to 1829.

Later from New Mexico, Slover crossed the southwest into Alta California on the Old Spanish Trail, and helped open overland trading between that province and New Mexico. By 1843, Slover had established himself and his family in California, settling near San Bernardino. He continued to trap and hunt in the region, and died of injuries received in a bear attack in 1854. Issac Slover is also thought to be buried in the cemetery of Agua Mansa. Slover Mountain nearby where he lived was named for him.
