= Francisco Dumetz =

Francisco Dumetz (died 14 January 1811) was a Spanish Franciscan missionary. He gave the San Bernardino Valley in California its name, in 1810.

== Life ==
He was a native of Mallorca, Spain, where he entered the Franciscan Order. In May 1770, he went to Mexico with forty-eight other Franciscans to join the Franciscan missionary college of San Fernando in Mexico City.

On volunteering for the Indian missions, he was sent to California in October, 1770. Sailing from San Blas, Jalisco, with ten friars in January, 1771, he reached Monterey in May and was assigned to Mission San Diego. In May 1772, he was transferred to Mission San Carlos Borromeo de Carmelo, and in May 1782, was appointed for Mission San Buenaventura.

There, he continued his mission work until August 1797, when he was directed to found Mission San Fernando. Dumetz remained there from its founding on 8 September to the end of 1805, except during 1803 and 1804, when apparently he resided at San Gabriel.

From January 1806, to the time of his death, Dumetz was stationed at San Gabriel. His remains were buried in the mission church on 15 January. Dumetz was the last of the pioneer friars in California, where he worked without interruption for forty years.

== Places named after Dumetz ==
Point Dume (a promontory in California) was a result of a misspelling of Dumetz's name. Other places bearing Dumetz's name include Dumetz Road in the San Fernando Valley and Dumetz street in Toulon, France.
