= La Placita, California =

La Placita
- Ghost town
- Interactive map of La Placita
- Coordinates: 34°01′09″N 117°21′00″W
- Country: United States
- State: California
- County: Riverside
- Time zone: UTC-8 (Pacific (PST))
  - Summer (DST): UTC-7 (PDT)

La Placita (originally: La Placita de los Trujillos; alternate: San Salvador) is a former settlement and the earliest community established in Riverside County, California, USA. The town was informally established soon after 1843 on the Santa Ana River, across from the town of Agua Mansa. La Placita and Agua Mansa were the first non-native settlements in the San Bernardino Valley. Together, they were referred to as "San Salvador", and were the largest settlements between New Mexico and Los Angeles in the 1840s.

== History ==
A group of genízaro colonists from Abiquiú, New Mexico, arrived in the area in the early 1840s. Don Juan Bandini donated a portion of Rancho Jurupa to them on the condition that they would assist in protecting his livestock from Indian raids. Lorenzo Trujillo led ten of the colonist families to 2,000 acres on the "Bandini Donation" on the southeast bank of the Santa Ana River and formed the village of La Placita while others went to the northwest bank of the river and created the town of Agua Mansa. Farms, orchards, and vineyards were planted and developed after an extensive irrigation system was incorporated. Livestock were tended on the mesa pasture area to the southeast in what is now Riverside. Formal establishment of the area as a political unit occurred in 1852 when the Board of Supervisors of Los Angeles County established a town called "San Salvador" encompassing Jurupa, Agua Mansa, and other adjacent settlements; Lorenzo Trujillo's house was established as the official location for elections. The region now resides in Riverside and San Bernardino Counties. After the Great Flood of 1862 and a second flood in 1886, most residents moved to other locations including what is now south Colton.

Today, the Agua Mansa cemetery is the main symbol of the history of the region. The area is now dominated by several industrial complexes and Riverside County waste transfer and recycling stations. Unfortunately, the historic nature of this area continues to be lost as local governments move to approve developments including warehousing and high density housing on these lands rather than celebrate and support the history of the area.

== Culture ==
The town's first church consisted of an arbor. After the adobe church that was built in 1852 collapsed in quicksand, a new church was built in Agua Mansa. Completed in 1853 and dedicated to San Salvador, the church survived through the Great Flood of 1862. The parish of San Salvador de Jurupa included La Placita and Agua Mansa; it was the first non-mission parish in Southern California. However, as residents moved from the area, a new congregation was established in 1893 in Colton, which retains the parish name of San Salvador, in the Roman Catholic Diocese of San Bernardino.

The Trujillo Adobe, which had been the home of Lorenzo Trujillo, was donated to the Riverside County Parks Department by JoAnn Conner (Dreesen), the niece of Charles Trujillo. The small structure south of the San Bernardino County boundary at the corner of Center and Orange Streets has been proposed for historic preservation.
