= Amasa Lyman =

American leader in the Latter Day Saint movement

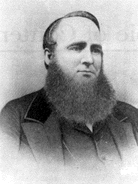

Quorum of the Twelve Apostles
- October 6, 1845 – October 6, 1867
- End reason: Stripped of Apostleship and position in Quorum for repeatedly teaching false doctrine

Counselor in the First Presidency
- February 4, 1843 – June 27, 1844
- End reason: Dissolution of First Presidency upon the death of Joseph Smith

Quorum of the Twelve Apostles
- August 20, 1842 – January 20, 1843
- End reason: Dropped from Quorum due to an excess of apostles occasioned by the readmission of Orson Pratt to the Quorum

Latter Day Saint Apostle
- August 20, 1842 – October 6, 1867
- Reason: Excommunication of Orson Pratt
- End reason: Stripped of Apostleship for repeatedly teaching false doctrine
- Reorganization at end of term: No apostles ordained

Personal details
- Born: Amasa Mason Lyman; March 30, 1813; Lyman, New Hampshire, United States
- Died: February 4, 1877 (aged 63); Fillmore, Utah Territory, United States
- Resting place: Fillmore Cemetery; 38.9544°N 112.3114°W
- Spouse(s): 8
- Children: 38
- Parents: Roswell Lyman; Martha Mason
- Signature
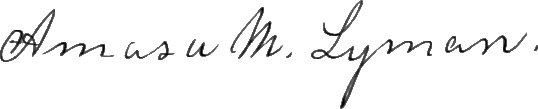

Amasa Mason Lyman (March 30, 1813 – February 4, 1877) was an early leader in the Latter Day Saint movement and was an apostle. He was also a counselor in the First Presidency to Joseph Smith.

== Early life and conversion ==
Lyman was born in Lyman, New Hampshire, the third son of Roswell Lyman and Martha Mason. In the spring of 1832, Lyman met two traveling Latter Day Saint missionaries, Orson Pratt and Lyman E. Johnson. Lyman was baptized a member of the Church of Christ on April 27, 1832, by Johnson. On April 28, Lyman was confirmed by Pratt.

After becoming a Latter Day Saint, Lyman traveled 370 miles to Palmyra, New York, where he hoped to meet Joseph Smith and Martin Harris. (Smith and Harris had lived in the Palmyra area when they published the Book of Mormon and organized the church in 1830). When Lyman arrived in Palmyra, he discovered that Smith and Harris had moved to Ohio the previous year, and that Smith was currently visiting Missouri.

Determined to join the Latter Day Saints in Ohio, Lyman found temporary employment on the farm of Thomas Lackey, who had bought Harris's farm. (Harris had sold it to raise money for the publication of the Book of Mormon). After working for two weeks, Lyman earned enough money to take a ship from Buffalo, New York, to Cleveland, Ohio. From Cleveland, Lyman walked the 45 miles to Hiram, where he was told Smith and his family were living. When Lyman met John Johnson, the owner of the house where Smith was living, he discovered that Johnson was the father of the missionary who had baptized him just weeks before. Johnson invited Lyman to live at his house and work on his farm. Lyman did so from June 5 until August 1832. Lyman met Smith on July 1 when Smith returned to Hiram from Missouri.

== Missionary service and church leadership ==
In August 1832, Smith told Lyman that "the Lord requires your labors in the vineyard". Lyman agreed to serve a mission for the church. On August 23, Lyman was ordained an elder by Smith and Frederick G. Williams. The following day, he departed with Zerubbabel Snow as a missionary. Lyman served with Snow and William F. Cahoon in the eastern United States, preaching as far east as Cabell County, Virginia, in present-day West Virginia. On December 11, 1833, Lyman was ordained a high priest by Lyman E. Johnson and Orson Pratt, the same elders who had taught and baptized him in 1832.

Lyman returned to church headquarters in Kirtland, Ohio, in May 1835. At a conference of the church in June, Lyman was called by Smith to be a member of the newly organized First Quorum of the Seventy. In 1836, Lyman received the "Kirtland endowment" in the Kirtland Temple.

== Marriage and family ==
In 1835, Lyman married Louisa Maria Tanner in Kirtland. They had eight children.

In April 1844, Smith taught Lyman the principle of plural marriage. "As he warmly grasped my hand for the last time," Lyman later recalled, "[Smith said] brother Amasa, go and practice on the principles I have taught you, and God bless you." Soon Lyman married his first and second plural wives, Diontha Walker and Caroline Partridge.

In 1846, Lyman married four additional wives: Eliza Maria Partridge (one of numerous widows of Smith and the 25-year-old sister of Lyman's wife Caroline), Paulina Eliza Phelps, Priscilla Turley, and Cornelia Leavitt. In 1851, Lyman married his eighth and final wife, Lydia Partridge, a sister of his wives Caroline and Eliza.

== Additional missions ==
Lyman served several missions for the church, preaching in Vermont, New Hampshire, New York, Wisconsin, Illinois, and Tennessee. In 1838, Lyman followed Smith to Far West, Missouri, where Smith relocated the headquarters of the church. Lyman participated in the Battle of Crooked River, a skirmish between Latter Day Saints and a Missouri militia unit from Ray County, which occurred on October 25, 1838.

In 1839, Lyman traveled with the Latter Day Saints to their new headquarters in Nauvoo, Illinois. In 1841, Lyman was appointed regent of the newly organized University of Nauvoo. On August 20, 1842, Smith called Lyman to serve as an apostle of the church. Lyman filled a vacancy in the Quorum of the Twelve created by the excommunication of Orson Pratt. Five months later, on January 20, 1843, Pratt was rebaptized and restored to his former position in the Quorum of the Twelve. As the most junior and "thirteenth" apostle, Lyman was excluded from the Quorum.

On February 4, 1843, Smith called Lyman to serve as an additional counselor in the First Presidency. Due to the turbulence of the years 1843 and 1844 for the Latter Day Saints, especially after Smith's death, Lyman was never sustained at a conference of the church to this position.

== Follower of Brigham Young ==
In July 1844 while traveling, Lyman learned that Smith and his brother Hyrum had been killed by a mob at Carthage, Illinois. He returned to Nauvoo. When apostles Brigham Young, Heber C. Kimball, Wilford Woodruff, Pratt, and Lyman Wight arrived in Nauvoo on August 6, Lyman sided with the group of Latter Day Saints who supported the leadership of Young and the Quorum of the Twelve Apostles, as opposed to that of Sidney Rigdon, Smith's First Counselor in the First Presidency.

Young restored Lyman as a member of the Quorum of the Twelve Apostles on August 12, 1844. In 1847, Lyman and his seven wives and children traveled with the Mormon pioneers who followed Young to the Salt Lake Valley in present-day Utah.

Young chose Lyman and Charles C. Rich to lead an expedition to establish a Mormon foothold in the San Bernardino Valley in southern California, a long-held ambition for Young. In March 1851, 437 Latter-day Saints under the leadership of Lyman and Rich left Great Salt Lake City. After traversing the Cajon Pass, the group purchased Rancho San Bernardino from the Lugo family, and built Fort San Bernardino. The fort quickly grew into a burgeoning settlement, reaching a population of 3,000 in 1856 and spurring the creation of a new county (split off from Los Angeles County in 1853) and the incorporation of a new municipality (in 1854). Lyman served as the first mayor of San Bernardino.

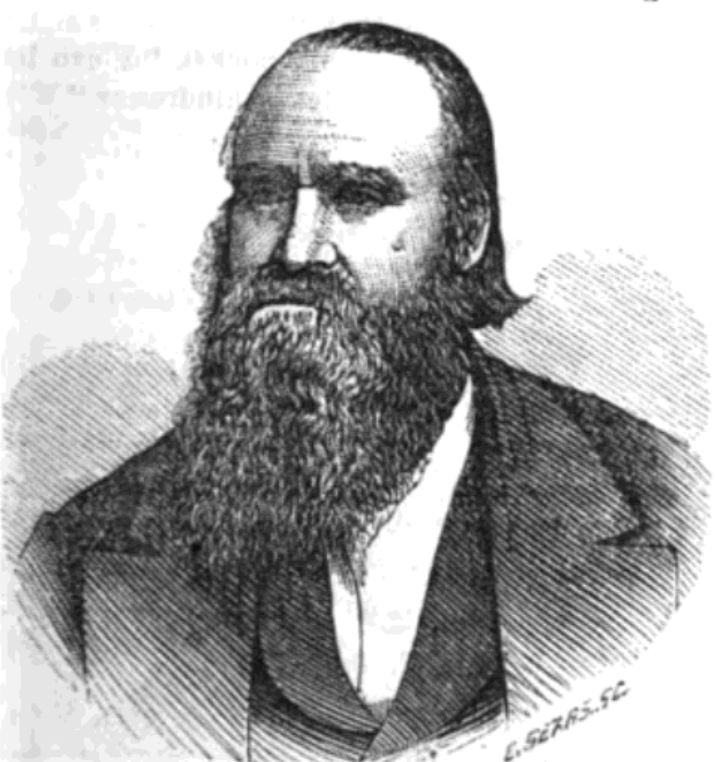
Portrait of Amasa Lyman

== Charges of heresy and excommunication ==
In 1860, Young appointed three of the twelve apostles—Lyman, Charles C. Rich, and George Q. Cannon—to the presidency of the church's European Mission. On March 16, 1862, Lyman preached a sermon in Dundee, Scotland, which all but denied the reality of and the necessity for the atonement of Jesus Christ, which is a central tenet of the LDS Church. His speech appeared to have been overlooked for years, but on January 21, 1867, Lyman was brought before his fellow quorum members to answer for his heretical words. Lyman confessed his error and apologized to the quorum. He wrote a letter of apology to the general membership of the church, which was published in the Deseret News.

However, months later, Lyman began publicly preaching the substance of his 1862 Dundee speech. As a result of his failure to live up to his confession and apology, the church stripped Lyman of the apostleship on May 6, 1867.

Following his removal, Lyman obeyed the counsel of the quorum members, even though he felt the advice was unappealing, and nineteen months later he was regularly attending Church services. However, in 1869, while not admitting any conversations to the Church of Zion, known as the Godbeites, Lyman began a relationship with William S. Godbe, and began traveling to Salt Lake City to meet with Godbe and his associates. Lyman associated constantly, preached, and even openly participated with the Godbeites. Lyman's renewed activism spread through Salt Lake City, and rumors began to be circulated that Lyman would even become president of the Church of Zion.

On May 10, 1870, three representatives from the Salt Lake Stake high council, where Lyman was residing, came to investigate his activism and the rumors. Following the meeting the three took their findings to the high council, and the council excommunicated Lyman on May 12, 1870.

== Death ==
Lyman died at Fillmore, Utah Territory on February 4, 1877. He and seven of his eight wives were the parents of 38 children. On January 12, 1909, by direction of church president Joseph F. Smith, Lyman was posthumously reinstated as a church member and an apostle, persuaded by assertions of mental illness.

Lyman's name is listed as one of the original pioneers on Cyrus Dallin's Brigham Young Monument in Temple Square.

== Notable descendants and relatives ==
- Sons Francis M. Lyman and Platte D. Lyman both served as president of the European Mission of the LDS Church.
- Francis M. Lyman and his grandson Richard R. Lyman, became apostles in the LDS Church. Francis became the President of the Quorum of the Twelve Apostles.
- Great-great-grandson James E. Faust served as an apostle for 29 years and as second counselor in the First Presidency of the church (1995–2007).
- Lyman Hall, a member of the Lyman family, was a signer of the Declaration of Independence.
- Alexander Joseph Lyman notable musician of Salt Lake City

== Chart: Lyman's 8 wives and 38 children ==
#	Year of Marriage	Wife's Name	Her Age	His Age	# of Children
1	1835	Louisa Maria Tanner	17	22	8
2	1843	Diontha Walker	27	30	0
3	1844	Caroline Partridge	17	31	6
4	1846	Eliza Maria Partridge	23	33	5
5	1846	Paulina Eliza Phelps	19	33	7
6	1846	Priscilla Turley	17	33	6
7	1846	Cornelia Leavitt	21	33	2
8	1853	Lydia Partridge	23	40	4
Total of children he fathered:					38

== Notes ==
The Church of Jesus Christ of Latter-day Saints titles
Preceded by Lyman Wight	Quorum of the Twelve Apostles; August 12, 1844 – October 6, 1867	Succeeded by Orson Pratt
Church of Jesus Christ of Latter Day Saints titles
Preceded by Lyman Wight	Quorum of the Twelve; August 20, 1842 – January 20, 1843	Succeeded by Orson Pratt
Preceded by John Smith; As "Assistant Counselor"	Counselor in the First Presidency; February 4, 1843–June 27, 1844; With: John Smith	Vacant First Presidency reorganized Title next held by Joseph F. Smith
