= Mill Creek (San Bernardino County) =

Tributary of the Santa Ana River in San Bernardino County, California, USA

- Location of Mill Creek in California

Location
- Country: United States
- State: California
- City: Forest Falls

Physical characteristics
- Source: San Bernardino Mountains
  - location: San Bernardino National Forest
  - coordinates: 34°04′36″N 116°50′38″W
  - elevation: 8,207 ft (2,501 m)
- Mouth: Santa Ana River
  - location: Near Mentone
  - coordinates: 34°05′27″N 117°07′11″W
  - elevation: 1,686 ft (514 m)
- Length: 17.8 mi (28.6 km)
- Discharge
  - location: Near Yucaipa
  - average: 38.3 cu ft/s (1.08 m^{3}/s)
  - minimum: 8.04 cu ft/s (0.228 m^{3}/s)
  - maximum: 20,000 cu ft/s (570 m^{3}/s)

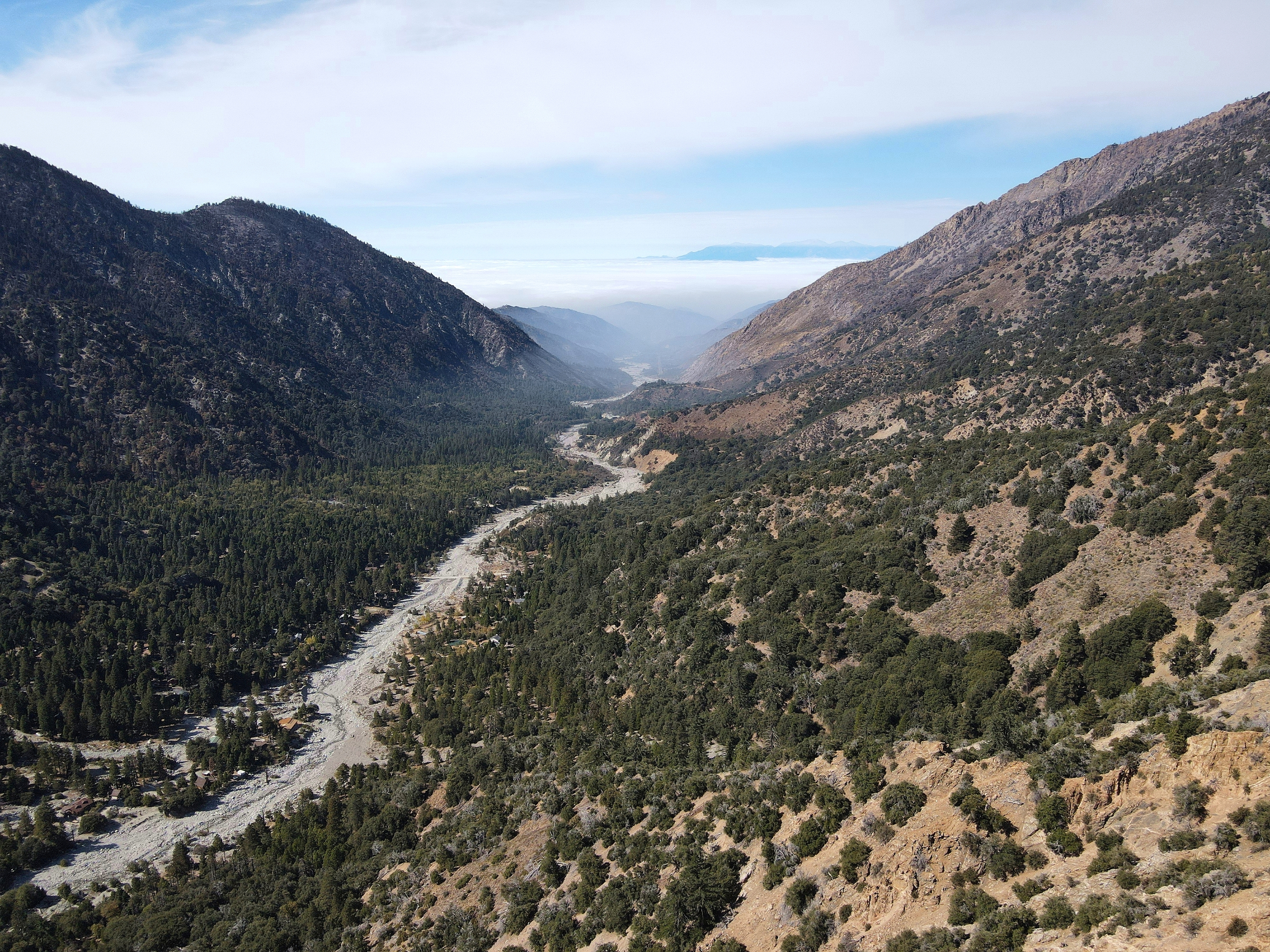

Mill Creek is a 17.8-mile-long (28.6 km) stream, originating in the San Bernardino Mountains, in San Bernardino County, California. It is a major tributary of the Santa Ana River. Their confluence occurs just downstream of the upper Santa Ana Canyon mouth. Part of the upper creek flows through San Bernardino National Forest, with the headwaters (High Creek and Mill Creek Jumpoff), being in the San Gorgonio Wilderness.

Mill Creek is in much better condition than the lower portions of the Santa Ana watershed, as its drainage area is less urbanized. However, the creek has three hydroelectric plants owned by Southern California Edison. The first commercial power plant in the United States using three-phase alternating current was the 250 kilowatt Mill Creek No. 1 Hydroelectric Plant, near Redlands, California, in 1893 designed by Almarian Decker.

The streambed is completely dewatered in some places. Also, a levee system was built by the United States Army Corps of Engineers after a severe flood, which degraded the riparian habitat. In addition, the poor conditions downstream interfere with fish migration to the creek.

== See also ==
- Mill Creek Zanja
