= Historical Glass Museum =

Museum in Redlands, California, US

Coordinates: 34°04′05″N 117°10′58″W

The Historical Glass Museum
- Established: 1977
- Location: Redlands, California
- Type: Glass museum
- Website: historicalglassmuseum.com

The Historical Glass Museum is a museum of glassmaking. It is located at 1157 North Orange St. in Redlands, California.

== History ==
The Historical Glass Museum was established in 1977 when the Historical Glass Museum Foundation purchased an Edwardian home, built in 1903 by Jerome Seymour, a woodworker and architect from West Virginia, to house the future museum's collection, amassed by Dixie and Doc Huckabee. The Foundation encouraged other collectors to donate to the Huckabees' collection, and the museum opened to the public in 1985. The collection currently comprises 6,000 pieces of glassware, making it the largest collection of American-made glass west of the Rocky Mountains.

== The collection ==
The Historical Glass Museum collection is organized by type, from Victorian Art Glass (1885-1900) and Early American Pattern Glass (1850-1920) to Depression Glass (1922-1944) and American Elegant Glass (1925-1955). The museum contains blown glass, molded glass, and machine-made glass. Some pieces are manganese glass, some are milk glass, and others are of different colors and specificities. Perfume bottles from Pearl Cogen make up a part of the collection. There are also 300 vinegar cruets donated by Harriet Thomason. The oldest piece in the entire collection is a bottle made in 1820.

== Film and television ==
- The museum was covered in a 1995 Huell Howser PBS episode.
