= Mill Creek Zanja =

- U.S. National Register of Historic Places
- U.S. Historic district
- California Historical Landmark
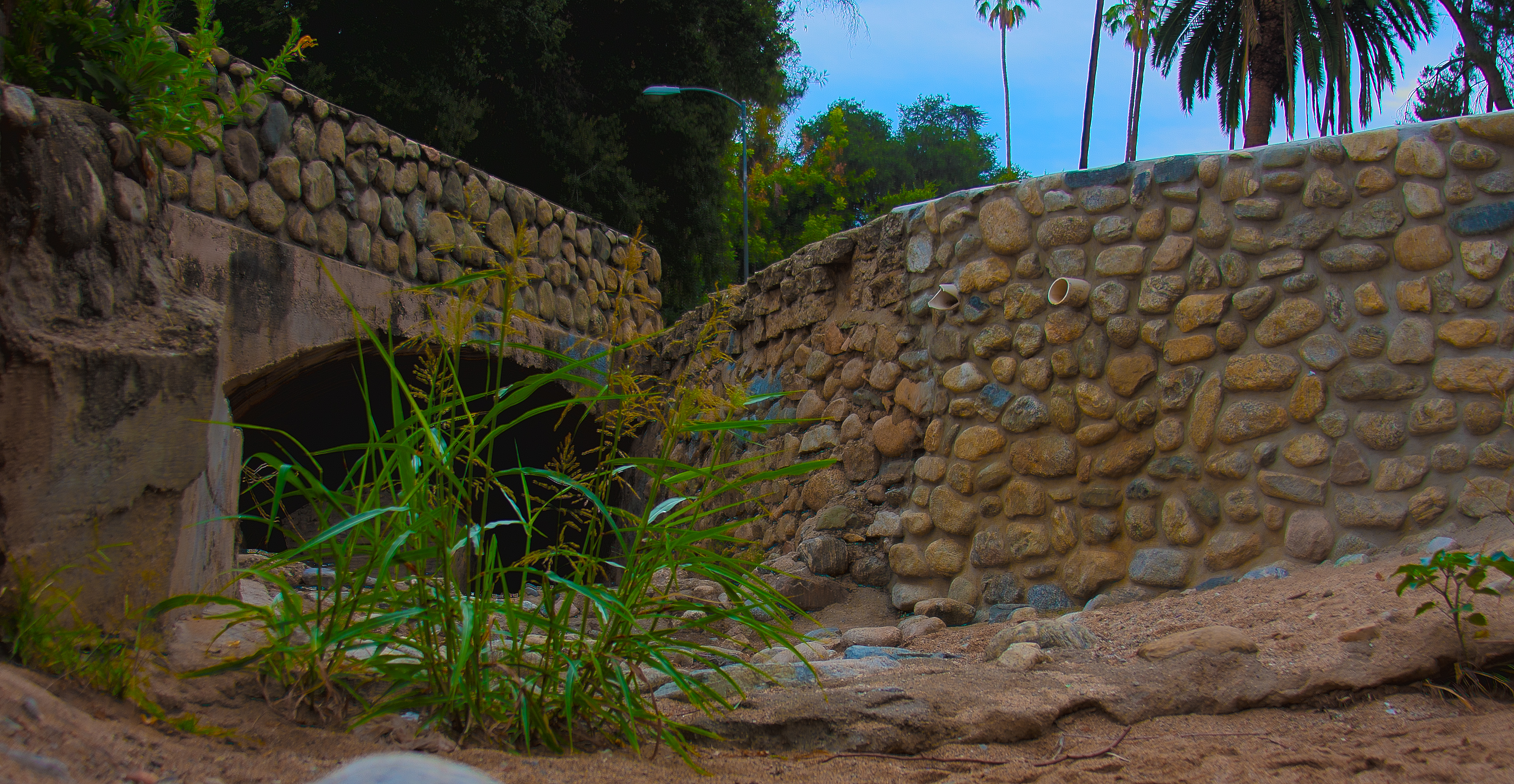

- Location within California Location within the United States
- Nearest city: Redlands, California
- Coordinates: 34°3′44″N 117°7′23″W
- Area: 15 acres (6.1 ha)
- NRHP reference No.: 77000329
- CHISL No.: 43

Significant dates
- Added to NRHP: May 12, 1977
- Designated CHISL: August 1, 1932

The Mill Creek Zanja, also known as the Zankey, is a historic irrigation canal, or zanja, in Redlands, California. The Serrano people dug the canal in 1819 to provide water from Mill Creek for their farms east of the city. The zanja also provided water for the San Bernardino de Sena Estancia mission outpost, which was built near the canal to access its water. The canal's water became a highly desirable resource in the area; it fueled a local agricultural boom and was the subject of several legal disputes over water rights in the 1800s. The City of Redlands covered the western half of the zanja in the 1920s.

The zanja was designated a California Historical Landmark in 1932, named a Historic Civil Engineering Landmark in 1972 and placed on the National Register of Historic Places in 1977. The canal now carries drainage water and storm runoff out of the city; it is the oldest irrigation canal in California which is still in use and the oldest civil engineering project in Southern California. The city, along with several other local groups, built a walk and bike trail and a greenway alongside most of the canal, named the Orange Blossom Trail.
