= Crafton, California =

Unincorporated community in California, United States

- Unincorporated community
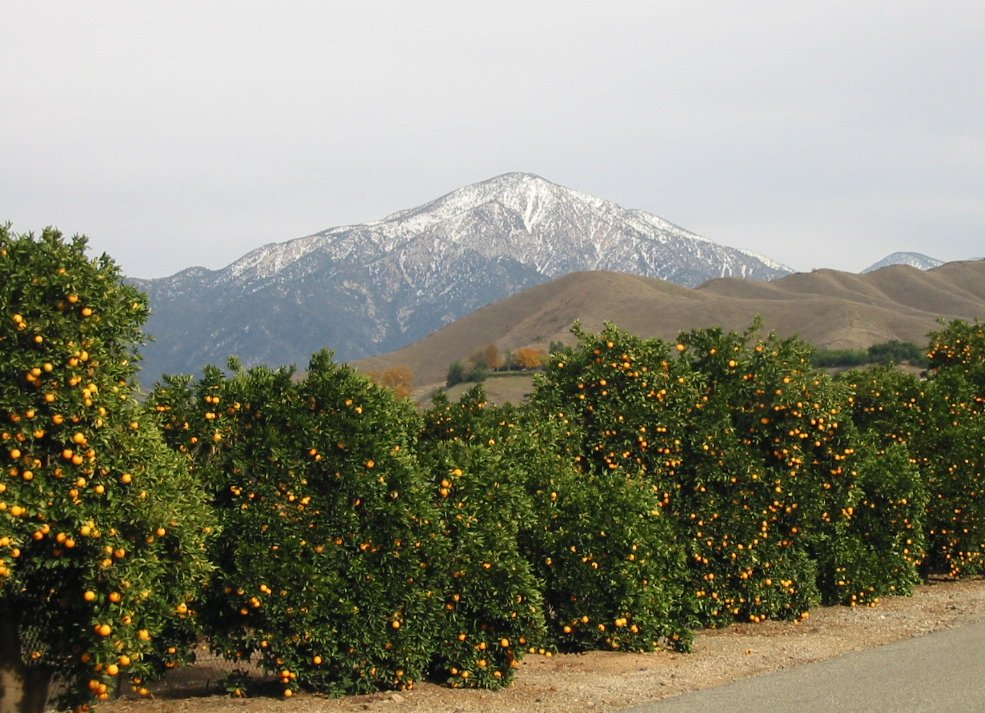
- Orange trees at the intersection of Crafton and Citrus Avenues. San Gorgonio Mountain in the distance

- Location within the state of California Crafton, California (the United States)
- Coordinates: 34°3′19″N 117°7′17″W
- Country: United States
- State: California
- County: San Bernardino
- Elevation: 1,755 ft (535 m)
- Time zone: UTC-8 (PST)
  - Summer (DST): UTC-7 (PDT)
- ZIP codes: 92374
- Area code: 909
- GNIS feature ID: 252875

Crafton is an unincorporated community in San Bernardino County, California, United States, located east of Redlands, south of Mentone and west of Yucaipa, California.

== History ==
Crafton was one of the first communities established in the San Bernardino Valley area. Lewis Cram and his brothers had been in the business of making chairs at San Bernardino de Sena Estancia (also known as Old San Bernardino), but around 1857, they decided to move upstream along the community aqueduct (called the zanja, Spanish for ditch) in order to gain more milling power from the water flow. Other settlers began to settle the area, planting barley, wheat, grapes, apples and peaches. George H. Crafts, Sr. bought land, known as the Altoona Ranch, in the area then called Eastberne in 1858 for his brother Myron, who arrived in 1861 to find George had already established a bounty of crops. In 1870, Myron H. Crafts planted an acre and a half of navel oranges, and the success of his crop soon convinced others in the area to plant larger plots. The Crafts ranch became popular as a resort; a person who regained his or her health there called it Crafton, and the area has been known by that name since.

Soon, Crafton began to rival Old San Bernardino in agricultural production. Myron H. Crafts, said to be intelligent and energetic, had begun to divert too much water from the zanja which carried water from Mill Creek. In court in 1864, Dr. Benjamin Barton of Old San Bernardino claimed exclusive right to all water in Mill Creek, with Crafts to have none. The court took a compromise stance that allowed Crafts to have any water he could divert daily between three o'clock in the afternoon and nine at night.

In 1867, W. W. McCoy filed a claim which would allow him to divert excess seasonal water from Mill Creek to his land in Crafton. His claim was denied at first but allowed later.

In 1870, another water suit was filed, this time by Crafts, for the purpose of once more defining his right to water in the zanja. The court decision established that he had the right to four hours of water per day. In 1871, the court decided further that Crafts must divide the stream of water into two flows, one for others and a smaller one for himself, an order which Crafts did not carry out. Crafts bought his neighbor's farms to the east through which the zanja ran, and reasoned that, since he thought of the ditch as a natural stream, which it resembled in places, that he should have half of its water. Other farmers in the area disagreed and brought suit. This case was taken to the California Supreme Court, where Crafts lost.

The first Protestant religious service in San Bernardino Valley was held in the Crafts home in 1873.

Having accumulated 1,800 acres (7.3 km^{2}) of land by this time, Myron H. Crafts established the Crafton Land and Water Company in 1882, and constructed a reservoir above the subdivision of Crafton: the Crafton Reservoir. The Crafton School District was organized in 1882, and a bond passed in 1887 to erect a schoolhouse first used in 1888. A post office was established in Crafton in 1885, with M.H. Crafts as postmaster. In 1886, the Crafton Water Company was formed by other area residents who bought the reservoir from Crafts and expanded it. Initially, they owned 14% of zanja flow but by 1949 had increased ownership to 53%.

In the 1870s and 1880s, a number of Native Americans of the Cahuilla tribe remained living in Crafton, working at agricultural tasks and tending sheep and stock that were owned by white settlers. Myron Crafts constructed a store for trading with the natives in the early 1880s. The building's first floor was the general store; its second floor was used as a Sunday School.

== Geography ==
Crafton lies on a sloped alluvial plain of the San Bernardino basin. The elevation increases toward the southeast. The area is fairly dry and requires irrigation to supply the navel orange groves. The supply of mountain water via Zanja Aqueduct is plentiful.

South and east of Crafton rise the Crafton Hills, a low, rolling set of hills created by about ten active normal dip-slip faults collectively called the Crafton Hills fault zone or the Crafton Hills Horst-and-Graben Complex which stretches between the San Jacinto fault and the San Andreas Fault. The highest point, Zanja Peak, tops out at 3,297 feet (1,005 m), approximately 1,600 feet (490 m) above Crafton. Crafton Hills is home to Crafton Hills College and includes recreational trails and the Crafton Reservoir, which supplies Crafton and Redlands with water.

Crafton holds the record for the highest temperature in the United States in November, when on November 12, 1906, the temperature reached 105.1 °F (40.6 °C).

== Community ==
The neighboring city of Redlands considers Mentone and Crafton as being within its sphere of influence; Crafton has no community plan of its own, though it has striven to maintain a rural feel with 50% of its homes hidden amid citrus groves. The maintaining of 5-acre (20,000 m^{2}) lots per residence was seen as a Crafton goal, as was the avoidance of its annexation to Redlands. Redlands noted in 2006 that if Crafton continues with their pattern of "grove estate" homes, the whole area can be annexed once the pattern is established, and that developers will go along with this.

The sloping land of Crafton serves as a watershed for Redlands, so the nearby city continues to be concerned with Crafton's water issues. Crafton has been observed by Redlands as having most of its residences on city water but not using city sewer services. Most homes use a septic tank system.

Crafton's historic citrus groves are inexpensive to sustain, making the area possibly the last agricultural community in the San Bernardino Valley area. A concern voiced in 2006 was the maintenance of the necessary agricultural infrastructure. Another concern is that increasing traffic through the area will have a deleterious effect on farming efforts.

== Government ==
=== Federal ===
Crafton is split between California's 33rd congressional district, represented by Democrat Pete Aguilar and California's 23rd congressional district represented by Republican Jay Obernolte.

=== State ===
In the state legislature Crafton is located in the 23rd Senate District, represented by Republican Bill Emmerson, and in the 40th and 42nd Assembly Districts, represented by Republicans Mike Morrell and Brian Nestande respectively.

=== Local ===
Crafton is an unincorporated community in San Bernardino County.

=== Community services ===
Crafton is patrolled by the San Bernardino Sheriff's department. Yucaipa Animal Control includes Crafton in their duties.
