= Antoinette Humphreys =

American librarian (1872–1917)

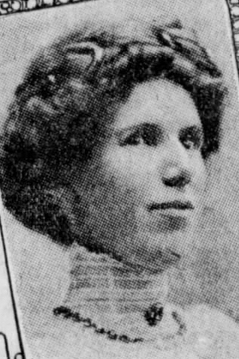
- Antoinette Humphreys from a 1911 publication
- Born: Antoinette Marie Humphreys; 1872
- Died: 1917 (aged 44–45)
- Other names: Antoinette Humphreys Hollabaugh
- Occupation: Librarian
- Years active: 1895–1911
- Known for: First county librarian of Merced County, California

Antoinette Marie Humphreys Hollabaugh (1872–1917) was an American librarian. She was a librarian in Redlands, California from 1895 to 1910, and in 1910 was the first county librarian of Merced County, California and Colusa County, California.

== Early life ==
Antoinette Marie Humphreys was the daughter of English-born cigarmaker Alfred Humphreys and Frances Higley Humphreys of Redlands, California.

== Career ==
Humphreys was the librarian at the public library in Redlands for fifteen years, beginning in 1895. She put an emphasis on works that supported local schools, and on collecting local history items and texts. In 1910, she became the first county librarian of Merced County, California, part of a state-wide expansion of free library services and county library systems. She opened the main library and eight branch locations in 1910 and 1911. She was active in the California Library Association, and addressed the annual California County Librarians Conference in 1911.

As Antoinette Hollabaugh, she worked for two months as the first county librarian of Colusa County, in 1916.

== Personal life ==
Antoinette Humphreys resigned as Merced County librarian in 1911, when she married banker Thomas Greene Hollabaugh. The Hollabaughs lived in Gustine, California. She died in 1917, in her mid-forties.

Humphreys was featured in an exhibit at the Merced County Courthouse Museum in 2010, marking the centenary of library services in the county.
