= Redlands, California =

- City
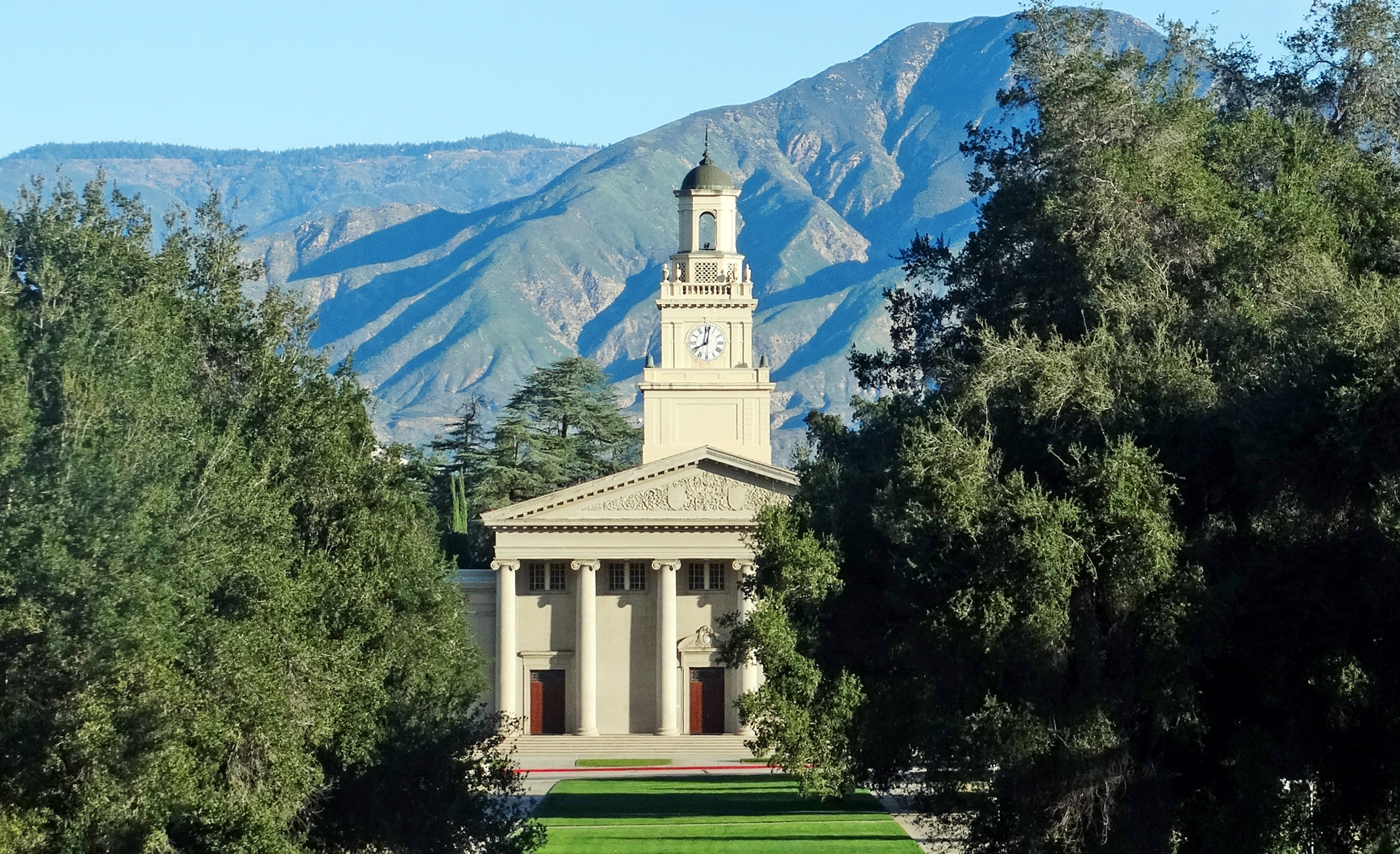
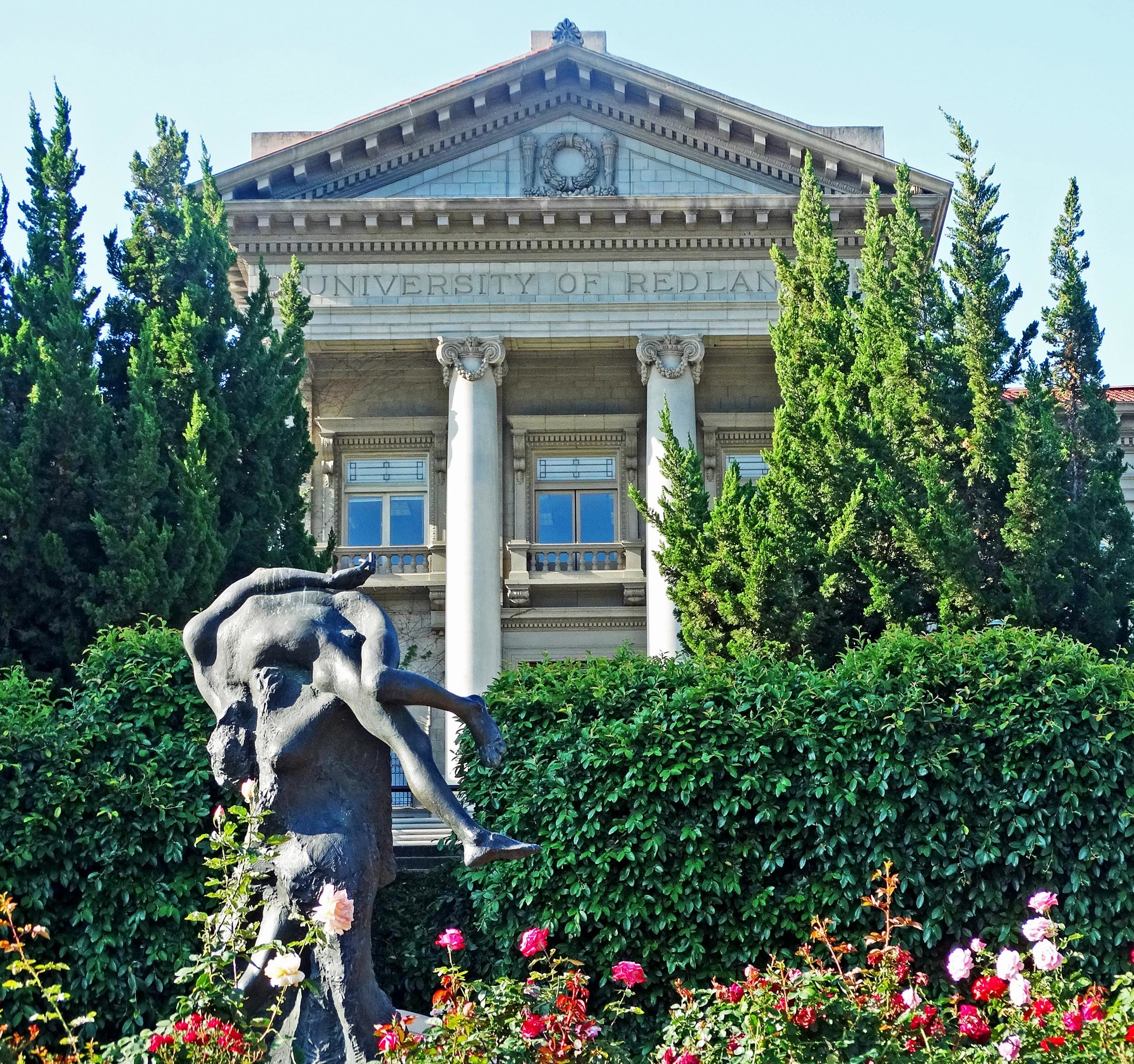
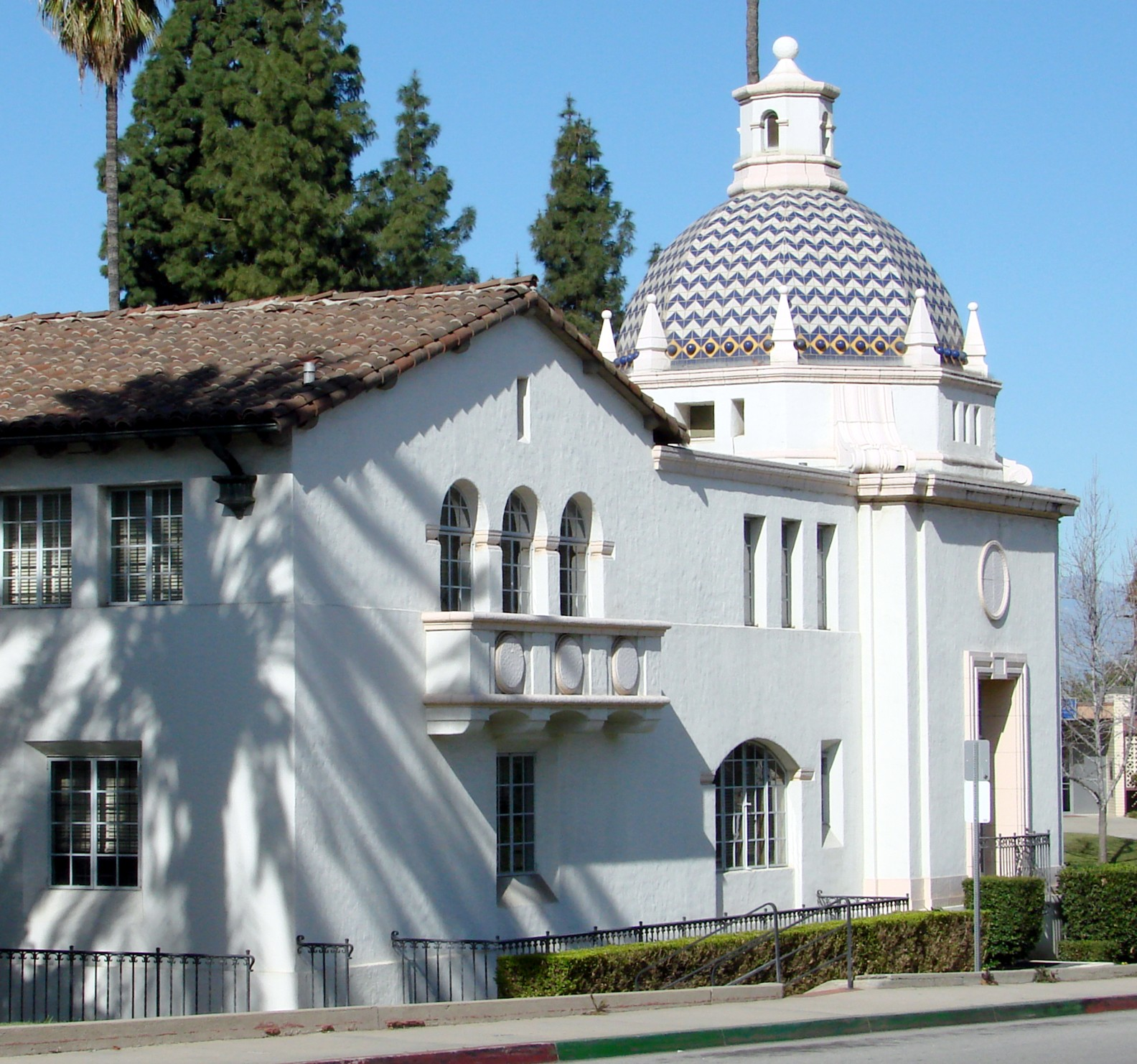
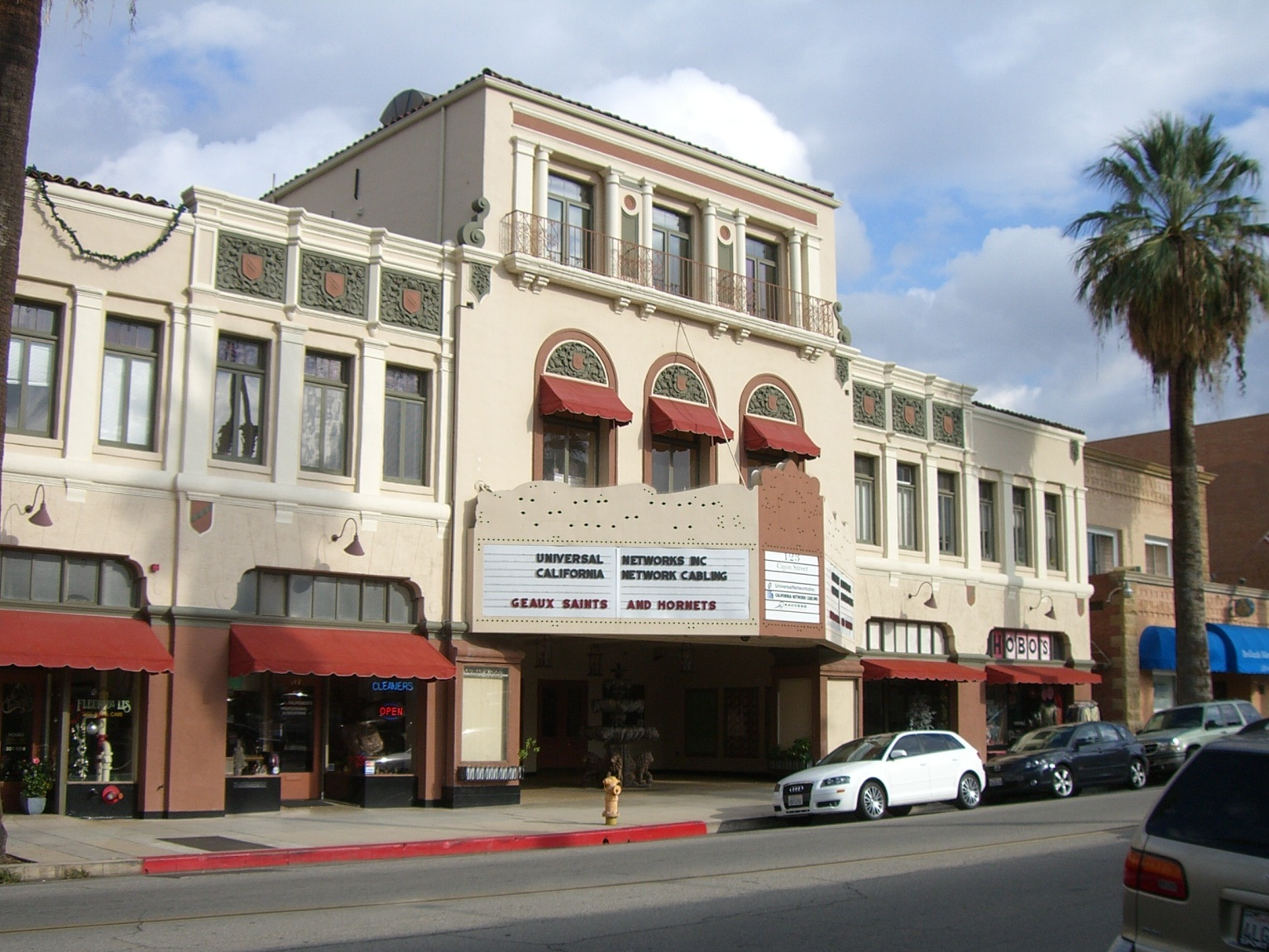
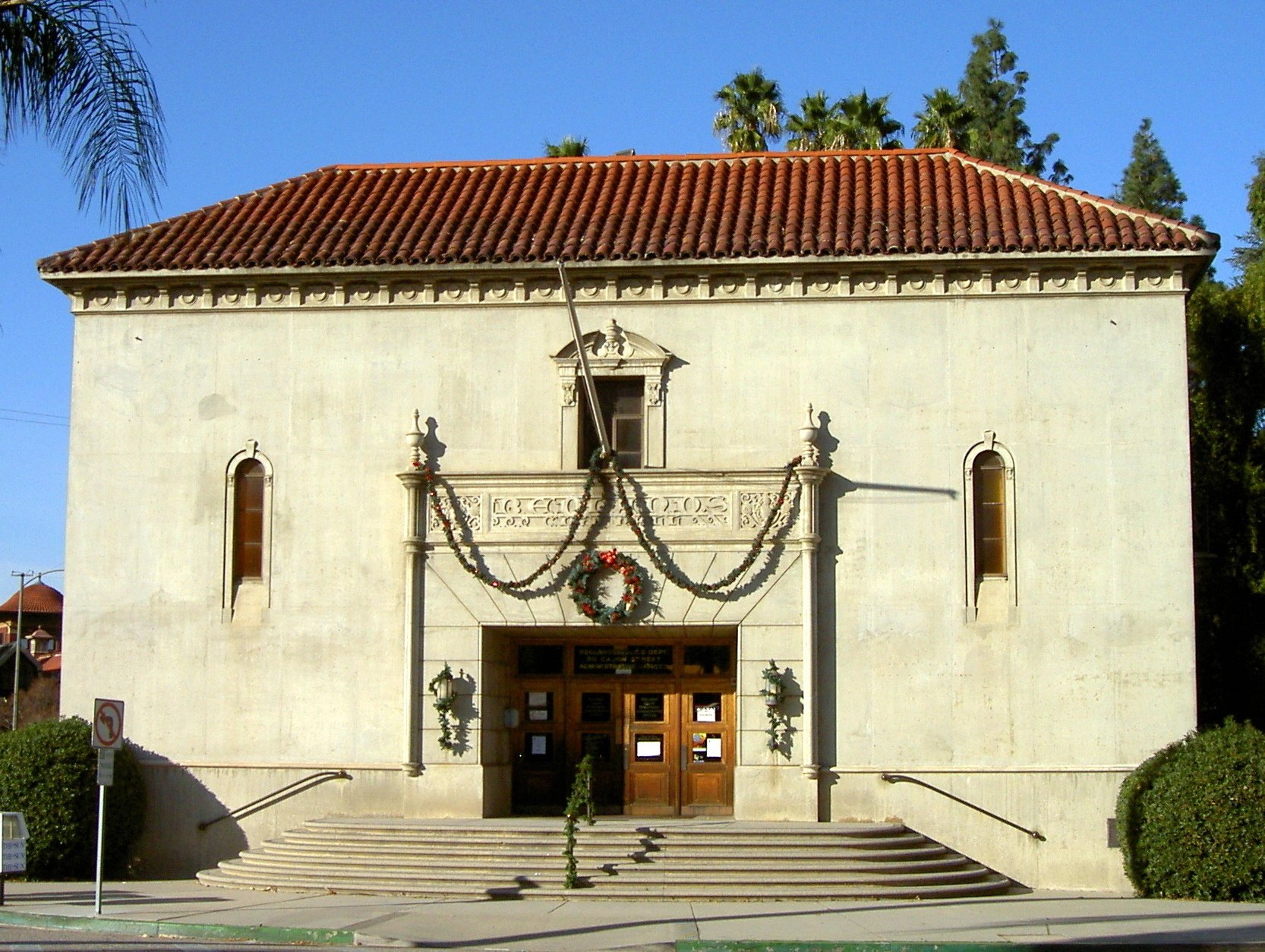
- Clockwise from top: University of Redlands, historic post office; police station; historic Fox Theatre; University of Redlands

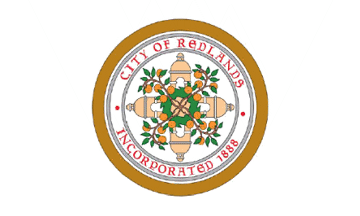
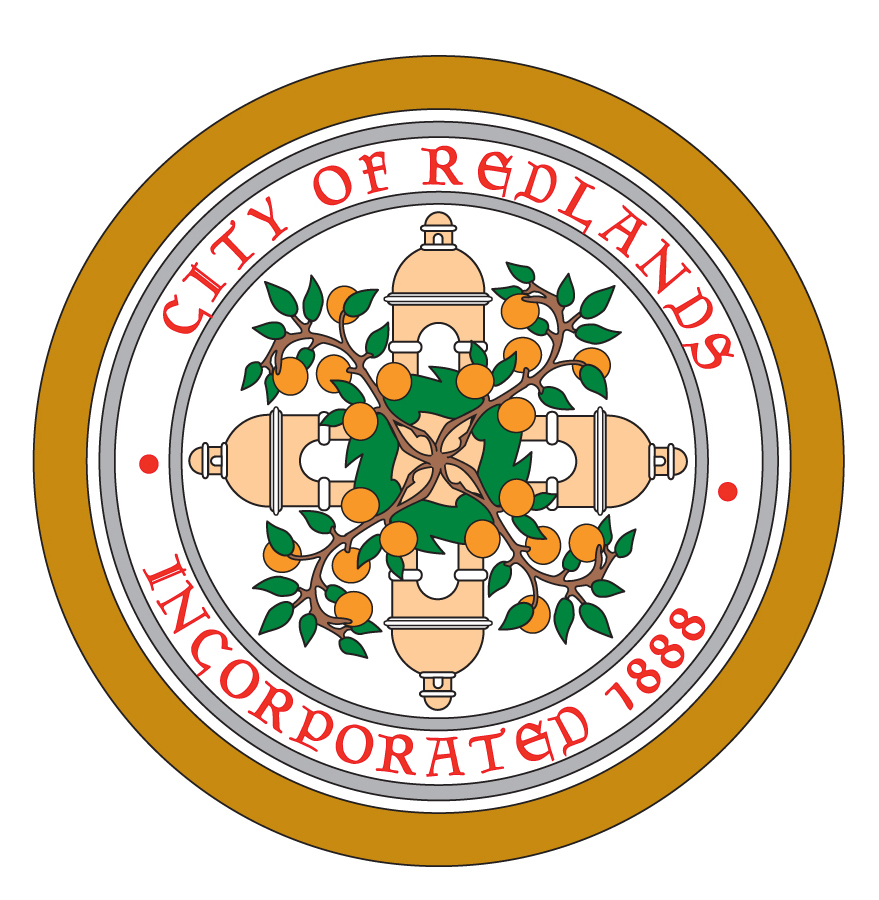
- Flag Seal
- Nickname: "Jewel of the Inland Empire"
- Interactive map of Redlands, California
- Location in the United States Redlands (California) Redlands (the United States)
- Coordinates: 34°3′17″N 117°10′57″W
- Country: United States
- State: California
- County: San Bernardino
- Incorporated: December 3, 1888
- Named for: The red color of the adobe soil of the area

Government
  - Type: Council-Manager
  - Mayor: Mario Saucedo

Area
  - Total: 36.25 sq mi (93.89 km^{2})
  - Land: 35.99 sq mi (93.22 km^{2})
  - Water: 0.26 sq mi (0.67 km^{2}) 0.72%
- Elevation: 1,358 ft (414 m)

Population (2020)
  - Total: 73,168
  - Density: 2,033/sq mi (784.9/km^{2})
- Time zone: UTC−8 (Pacific)
  - Summer (DST): UTC−7 (PDT)
- ZIP Codes: 92373–92374
- Area code: 909
- FIPS code: 06-59962
- GNIS feature IDs: 0252966, 2411532
- Website: www.redlands.gov

Redlands (/ˈrɛdləndz/ RED-ləndz) is a city in San Bernardino County, California, United States. As of the 2020 census, the city had a population of 73,168, up from 68,747 at the 2010 census. The city is located approximately 70 miles (110 km) northwest of Indio and 63 miles (101 km) east of Los Angeles.

Redlands was founded in 1881 on land that encompassed native Serrano, Morongo and Cahuilla tribes. Redlands absorbed the communities of Terracina, Idlewild, Plaza, Chicago Colony, Victoria, Barton, Gladysta, and Lugonia along with portions of Mentone, Crafton and Bryn Mawr when it incorporated in 1888. Redlands is home to the Asistencia Mission founded in 1819 by early European settlers. By the early 20th century, it was a major focal point of California's citrus industry and the location of the largest producer of navel oranges in the world.

Throughout its past, Redlands has a history of philanthropic residents establishing lasting legacies. Examples include the Smiley Library in 1898, the University of Redlands in 1907, the Redlands Bowl in 1924, the Lincoln Memorial Shrine in 1932, the Redlands Bicycle Classic in 1985 and the Garner Holt Foundation's "Garner's Garage" for animatronic STEM education and research in 2024.

Redlands is located in the Inland Empire region of Southern California. Redlands is home to Esri, the Redlands Historical Glass Museum and the San Bernardino County Museum.

== History ==
The area of Redlands was territory that historically was occupied by the Morongo and Aguas Calientes tribes of Cahuilla people. Explorations such as those of Pedro Fages and Francisco Garcés sought to extend Catholic influence to the indigenous people and the dominion of the Spanish crown into the area in the 1770s. The Tongva village of Kaawchama, located just to the west of present-day Redlands, was visited by Fr. Francisco Dumetz in 1810, and was the reason the site was chosen for a mission outpost. Dumetz reached the village on May 20, the feast day of Saint Bernardino of Siena, and thus named the region the San Bernardino Valley. The Franciscan friars from Mission San Gabriel established the San Bernardino Estancia in 1819 and embarked on the usual program of training the native tribes to raise crops and mandating permanent settlements. By 1820, a ditch, known as a zanja, was dug by conscripted native labor for the friars from Mill Creek to the Estancia. In 1822, word of the Mexican triumph in the War of Independence reached the inland area, and lands previously claimed by Spain passed to the custody of the newly established Mexican government.

=== Townships into Cityhood ===
==== Lugonia and Redlands Colony ====
In 1842, the Lugo family bought the Rancho San Bernardino Mexican land grant and this became the first fixed settler civilization in the area. The current northwest area of Redlands, that astrides the Santa Ana River, was founded as Lugonia. The region was part of Alta California, a Mexican federal province until 1848, when it became part of the United States after the Mexican-American War. By 1850, California as a US state was established. The area received its first Anglo inhabitants in the form of several hundred Mormon pioneers, who purchased the entire Rancho San Bernardino, founded nearby San Bernardino, and established a prosperous farming community watered by the many lakes and streams of the San Bernardino Mountains. The Mormon community left wholesale in 1857, recalled to Utah by Brigham Young during the tensions with the US federal government that ultimately led to the brief Utah War. Benjamin Barton purchased 1,000 acres (4 km^{2}) from the Latter-Day Saints. On this land, he planted extensive vineyards and a winery.

Lugonia attracted settlers including, Barry Roberts in 1869, followed a year later by the Craw and Glover families. "The first school teacher in Lugonia, George W. Beattie, arrived in 1874—shortly followed by the town's first negro settler, Israel Beal." Charles Nordhoff's 1873 book, "California: for Health, Pleasure, and Residence" was published. Nordhoff noted the regions warm winters and abundance of land. It attracted many people to Lugonia suffering from tuberculosis, among other ailments seeking health benefits in a dry climate, and available lands for sale. "The first settler on the site of the present Redlands is recorded to have erected a hut at the corner of what is now Cajon St. and Cypress Ave.; he was a sheep herder, and the year, 1865," reported Ira L. Swett in "Tractions of the Orange Empire".

In the 1880s, the arrival of the Southern Pacific and Atchison, Topeka and Santa Fe Railroads, connecting Southern California to San Francisco and Salt Lake triggered a land boom, with speculators such as John W. North flooding the area now known as the Inland Empire. The Redlands Colony was soon established by Frank E. Brown, a civil engineer, and E. G. Judson, a New York stock broker, to provide a center (along with John W. North's nearby settlement of Riverside) for the burgeoning citrus industry. They named their area, just south of Lugonia, "Redlands" after the color of the adobe soil. So large had the area grown by 1888 that it was decided to incorporate all the local towns into one city. The original townships of Lugonia, Bryn Mawr, Barton, Terracina Colony, Victoria Colony, Gladysta, parts of Mentone, and parts of Crafton Colony were mended into one incorporated city with the newly established Redlands Colony. "A red-letter day in the annals of Redlands", pronounced Scipio Craig, editor of The Citrograph newspaper, of the November 26 incorporation. The newspaper was first published in July 1887 by The Citrograph Printing Company, which remains in 2026 as both Redlands' oldest business and the longest-operating printing company in California. E. G. Judson served as the first mayor of Redlands.

=== Railroads ===
The Redlands Street Railway Company was incorporated on March 22, 1888, acquiring on June 5 a franchise from the San Bernardino County Supervisors dating to December 1887, conveying the right to construct, operate and maintain for a term of 50 years a line of street railways in Redlands, Terracina and vicinity. The initial operations began in June 1889 with a single-track line operating two-mule-team cars, the first street railway company of several to provide service to the community. Electrification and new rails replaced mules in 1899, with electrical operation beginning in December. Most Redlands street railways would pass to the San Bernardino Valley Traction Company in a consolidation on June 3, 1903, and thence to the Pacific Electric in the "Great Merger" of Huntington properties under new ownership by the Southern Pacific Transportation Company on February 8, 1911. Henry E. Huntington, nephew of late Southern Pacific president Collis P. Huntington, had gained control of the four-mile-long (6.4 km) streetcar line of the Redlands Central Railway Company in 1908.

The Pacific Electric Railway (PE) completed an interurban connection between Los Angeles and San Bernardino in 1914, providing a convenient, speedy connection to the fast-growing city of Los Angeles and its new port at San Pedro, bringing greater prosperity to the town and a new role as a vacation destination for wealthy Angelenos. Redlands was the eastern terminus of the "Big Red Car" system. At its peak, PE operated five local routes in Redlands, with streetcars running to Smiley Heights and on Orange, Olive, and Citrus Avenues. Pacific Electric's interurban service to Redlands was abandoned on July 20, 1936, with 2.07 miles (3.33 km) of track into the city lifted, although PE and Southern Pacific (parent company of PE) provided freight service as far as the Sunkist packing plant at Redlands Heights on San Bernardino Avenue into at least the 1970s. The Smiley Heights line was abandoned at this time, as well. Bus service operated by the Motor Transit Company, a subsidiary of Pacific Electric, began on July 20. This also affected mail delivery in Redlands as "Approximately 80 percent of our mail from all directions arrives on the 5 a.m. electric car," explained Postmaster James B. Stone. "This dispatch is sorted and morning deliveries started by 8:30 a.m. on most routes. The post office department has temporarily arranged for this mail to be brought in by the Santa Fe train at 6:05 a.m. As this arrival is an hour later, our service will be one hour later." The abandoned Pacific Electric La Quinta trestle over the Santa Ana River stood immediately south of San Bernardino International Airport into the 2010s but was removed when an Amazon facility was built adjacent to the site.

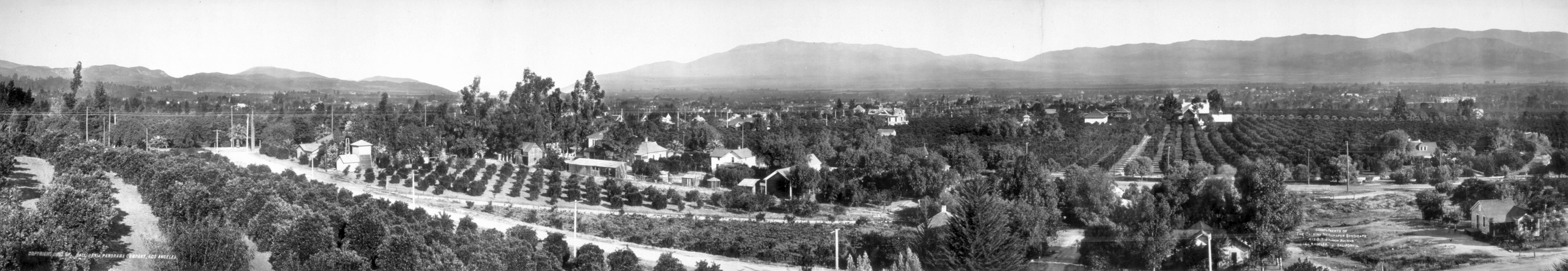
Redlands, 1908

=== Electricity ===
"History was made in the electrical industry July 27, 1892, when a franchise was granted to the Electric Light & Power Co., which was incorporated Oct. 6 and began building a powerhouse in Mill Creek canyon. Thus the groundwork was laid for the world's first (three)-phase transmission line, which brought electricity to Redlands and later became a unit in the Southern California Edison Co." The 250 kilowatt AC Mill Creek No. 1 Hydroelectric Plant was designed by Almirian Decker. Electric arc lamps were first illuminated over Redlands streets on August 5, 1893. George B. Ellis, one of seven men who spearheaded the undertaking, is largely credited with originating the plan.

"The first line was extended from the Mill Creek powerhouse to East Citrus avenue, thence to Redlands and to Mr. Ellis' Terracina hotel. By September the company was advertising power for sale to the public. The firm boasted of ability to supply current enough for 55 arc lamps, and 1,500 homes." Engineer O. H. Ensign was "largely responsible for the success of the undertaking." When gas lighting became available in Redlands in 1900, many homes already had electricity.

"The same group of men in 1894 organized the Southern California Power Co. Later it was merged with the Edison Electric Co., of Los Angeles, a forerunner of the Southern California Edison Co."

=== Citrus ===
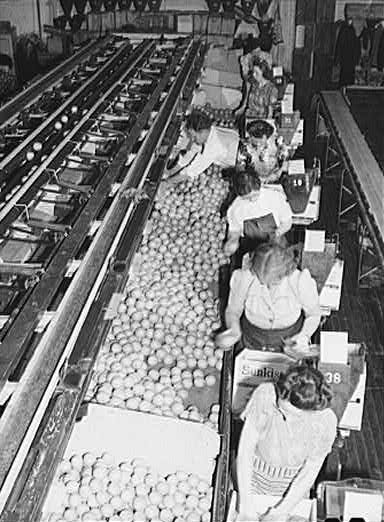
Women packing oranges at the Sunkist packing plant in Redlands, 1943

In the spring of 1882, Mr. E. J. Waite of Wisconsin planted the first orange grove in the city. For almost 75 years, the city was the center of the largest navel orange-producing region in the world. By the late 1930s, Redlands was a fruit-packing center surrounded by more than 15,000 acres (61 km^{2}) of citrus groves. The city produced more than 4,200 railcars of navel oranges and 1,300 cars of Valencia oranges during the 1937–38 growing season. During the 1930s and 1940s, labor activists campaigned in the canneries and packing houses for union representation and higher wages. The United Cannery, Agricultural, Packing, and Allied Workers of America (UCAPAWA) won 13 National Labor Relations Board representation elections in the Riverside-Redlands area in 1943. In 1945, the first annual Orange Queen Ball at the Redlands City Auditorium was held to raise funds for the union.

The citrus industry declined in the area due to restrictions on the citrus growers by the newly formed EPA established by President Richard Nixon. As more growers sold their land, Developers replaced orange groves with subdivisions, and all three citrus packing houses (two in downtown and one on San Bernardino Avenue) had closed by the end of the 20th century. The last packing house, Redlands Foothill Grove, closed in 2023.

=== Community ===
At the turn of the 20th century, Redlands was the "Palm Springs" of that era, drawing tourists from around the world for the appreciation of winter gardens, rare botanical plantings, and the fragrance of orange blossom season, as well as healthful water from local mountains and springs. Roses and other trophy plant specimens were planted along many city thoroughfares. Some of these plantings would survive as wild thickets into the 1970s, especially adjacent to orange groves where property management was lax. Washingtonia palms (Washingtonia filifera var. robusta) were planted along many main avenues. So beautifully kept was the area, with the dramatic mountain backdrops, that for several years the Santa Fe Railroad operated excursion trains along the loop that passed through the orange groves of Redlands and Mentone, across the Santa Ana River, and back into San Bernardino via East Highlands, Highlands and Patton, and advertised as the "Kite-Shaped Track" due to its multi-sided alignment. The trestle over "the Wash" north of Mentone was carried away during a flood in March 1938 and never replaced, the line being truncated there. The Southern Pacific branch line from the San Timoteo Canyon to Crafton was abandoned after the downtown packing house business died. A thru-truss bridge over the Zanja (locally pronounced "san-kee") exists today, abandoned in place. Burlington Northern Santa Fe, result of the AT&SF-Burlington Northern merger, applied to abandon its San Bernardino-connected branch line east of downtown Redlands in 2007, the last shippers at Crafton and Mentone having ceased operations. A move was made by transit activists beginning in the 1990s to have this branch revitalized as part of the Southern California transit districts, but it came to nothing for many years. After Metrolink regional commuter rail became involved and funds secured, reconstruction began in 2019 and named Arrow. It was completed in 2022, a Metrolink branch from San Bernardino to end-of-track on the eastern side of town adjacent to the campus of the University of Redlands. 5 new stations with mostly local service to and from the San Bernardino Transit Center and one daily ride to Los Angeles Union Station.

The city has been visited by three sitting U.S. Presidents: William McKinley was the first in 1901, followed by Theodore Roosevelt in 1903 and William Howard Taft in 1909. Local landmarks include the A.K. Smiley Public Library, a Moorish-style library built in 1898, and the Redlands Bowl, built in 1930 and home of the oldest continuously free outdoor concert series in the United States. Located behind the Smiley Library is the Lincoln Shrine, the only memorial honoring the "Great Emancipator", the sixteenth president Abraham Lincoln, west of the Mississippi River. Famous homes include "America's Favorite Victorian", the Morey Mansion, on Terracina Boulevard, and the Kimberly Crest House and Gardens, a home museum featured on the PBS series "America's Castles". Named after the family that purchased the house, the owners of Kimberly-Clark (makers of paper goods and Kleenex), it is a beautiful mansion set high on a hill overlooking the whole valley. Redlands is still regarded as the "Jewel of the Inland Empire".

In the mid-late 20th Century, Redlands was home to various light manufacturing firms, and became a bedroom community for the military personnel and contractor employees of the aerospace industry that supported missions at Norton Air Force Base, as well as the Lockheed Propulsion Company plant in Mentone. In 1989, Norton Air Force Base was placed on the Department of Defense closure list. Norton Air Force Base closed in 1994–1995 and the population dropped in the area, with a mild local economic recession occurring due to the closure in the area. The former Air Force Base is now the home of the San Bernardino International Airport and a variety of other business concerns also utilize the space. Jack Dangermond established Esri in 1969, a local software company. By the year 2000, he was the largest employer in Redlands. Redlands remains a regional destination, with its vibrant downtown, shopping, restaurants and college nightlife. A modern car centric shopping center was built in 2004 named Citrus Plaza. The plaza was built in unincorporated land surrounded by the city of Redlands, in land locally known as the "Donut Hole". The city invested in infrastructure for the donut hole for many years prior to the county approving the plaza with plans to annex the large block. The county went ahead and approved the plaza without the city of Redlands approval. The plaza remains a popular shopping destination.

== Geography ==
According to the United States Census Bureau, the city has a total area of 36.3 square miles (94 km^{2}). 36.0 square miles (93 km^{2}) of it is land and 0.3 square miles (0.78 km^{2}) of it (0.72%) is water.

=== Climate ===
The climate in this area is described by the Köppen Climate Classification System as "dry-summer subtropical" often referred to as "Mediterranean" and abbreviated as Csa.

The data below were compiled from 1898 through 2015, accessed via the Western Regional Climate Center.

Climate data for Redlands, CA
Month	Jan	Feb	Mar	Apr	May	Jun	Jul	Aug	Sep	Oct	Nov	Dec	Year
Record high °F (°C)	93 (34)	92 (33)	97 (36)	106 (41)	109 (43)	114 (46)	118 (48)	113 (45)	115 (46)	110 (43)	98 (37)	90 (32)	118 (48)
Mean maximum °F (°C)	79.7 (26.5)	81.3 (27.4)	85.6 (29.8)	91.5 (33.1)	96.0 (35.6)	101.5 (38.6)	104.8 (40.4)	104.6 (40.3)	103.5 (39.7)	96.8 (36.0)	87.6 (30.9)	80.2 (26.8)	107.4 (41.9)
Mean daily maximum °F (°C)	64.8 (18.2)	66.1 (18.9)	69.1 (20.6)	73.8 (23.2)	78.6 (25.9)	86.8 (30.4)	94.5 (34.7)	94.3 (34.6)	90.2 (32.3)	81.0 (27.2)	72.6 (22.6)	65.8 (18.8)	78.1 (25.6)
Mean daily minimum °F (°C)	39.4 (4.1)	41.3 (5.2)	43.6 (6.4)	46.8 (8.2)	51.2 (10.7)	55.2 (12.9)	60.3 (15.7)	60.7 (15.9)	57.6 (14.2)	51.3 (10.7)	44.0 (6.7)	39.6 (4.2)	49.3 (9.6)
Mean minimum °F (°C)	29.7 (−1.3)	32.3 (0.2)	34.7 (1.5)	38.0 (3.3)	42.8 (6.0)	55.2 (12.9)	60.3 (15.7)	52.7 (11.5)	49.1 (9.5)	42.3 (5.7)	34.6 (1.4)	30.0 (−1.1)	27.1 (−2.7)
Record low °F (°C)	18 (−8)	25 (−4)	28 (−2)	31 (−1)	33 (1)	40 (4)	49 (9)	46 (8)	41 (5)	28 (−2)	26 (−3)	23 (−5)	18 (−8)
Average precipitation inches (mm)	2.68 (68)	2.64 (67)	2.28 (58)	1.17 (30)	0.47 (12)	0.10 (2.5)	0.07 (1.8)	0.15 (3.8)	0.28 (7.1)	0.69 (18)	1.13 (29)	1.89 (48)	13.55 (345.2)
Source: WRCC

== Demographics ==
Historical population
Census	Pop.	Note	%±
1890	1,904		—
1900	4,797		151.9%
1910	10,449		117.8%
1920	9,571		−8.4%
1930	14,177		48.1%
1940	14,324		1.0%
1950	18,429		28.7%
1960	26,829		45.6%
1970	36,355		35.5%
1980	43,619		20.0%
1990	60,394		38.5%
2000	63,591		5.3%
2010	68,747		8.1%
2020	73,168		6.4%
U.S. Decennial Census

=== 2023 ACS 5-year estimates ===
In 2023, the US Census Bureau (American Community Survey) estimated that the median household income was $99,158, and the per capita income was $47,944. About 4.9% of families and 7.4% of the population were below the poverty line.

=== Racial and ethnic composition ===
Redlands city, California – Racial and ethnic composition Note: the US Census treats Hispanic/Latino as an ethnic category. This table excludes Latinos from the racial categories and assigns them to a separate category. Hispanics/Latinos may be of any race.
Race / Ethnicity (NH = Non-Hispanic)	Pop 2000	Pop 2010	Pop 2020	% 2000	% 2010	% 2020
White alone (NH)	40,265	37,103	33,030	63.32%	53.97%	45.14%
Black or African American alone (NH)	2,625	3,326	3,396	4.13%	4.84%	4.64%
Native American or Alaska Native alone (NH)	336	236	240	0.53%	0.34%	0.33%
Asian alone (NH)	3,186	5,100	6,786	5.01%	7.42%	9.27%
Native Hawaiian or Pacific Islander alone (NH)	118	201	180	0.19%	0.29%	0.25%
Other race alone (NH)	88	138	380	0.14%	0.20%	0.52%
Mixed race or Multiracial (NH)	1,669	1,833	3,410	2.62%	2.67%	4.66%
Hispanic or Latino (any race)	15,304	20,810	25,746	24.07%	30.27%	35.19%
Total	63,591	68,747	73,168	100.00%	100.00%	100.00%

=== 2020 census ===
As of the 2020 census, Redlands had a population of 73,168. The population density was 2,032.9 inhabitants per square mile (784.9/km^{2}).

The age distribution was 21.9% under the age of 18, 10.3% aged 18 to 24, 26.5% aged 25 to 44, 23.6% aged 45 to 64, and 17.7% who were 65 years of age or older. The median age was 37.9 years. For every 100 females, there were 90.5 males, and for every 100 females age 18 and over there were 86.8 males age 18 and over.

The census reported that 96.1% of the population lived in households, 2.8% lived in non-institutionalized group quarters, and 1.2% were institutionalized. There were 26,060 households, out of which 32.5% included children under the age of 18, 49.2% were married-couple households, 6.1% were cohabiting couple households, 28.9% had a female householder with no spouse or partner present, and 15.8% had a male householder with no spouse or partner present. 24.3% of households were one person, and 10.6% were one person aged 65 or older. The average household size was 2.7. There were 18,005 families (69.1% of all households).

98.5% of residents lived in urban areas, while 1.5% lived in rural areas.

There were 27,471 housing units at an average density of 763.3 units per square mile (294.7 units/km^{2}), of which 94.9% were occupied and 5.1% were vacant. Of the occupied units, 59.8% were owner-occupied and 40.2% were occupied by renters. The homeowner vacancy rate was 1.2% and the rental vacancy rate was 5.1%.

Racial composition as of the 2020 census
Race	Number	Percent
White	38,969	53.3%
Black or African American	3,705	5.1%
American Indian and Alaska Native	866	1.2%
Asian	7,063	9.7%
Native Hawaiian and Other Pacific Islander	207	0.3%
Some other race	10,523	14.4%
Two or more races	11,835	16.2%

=== 2010 census ===
The 2010 United States census reported that Redlands had a population of 68,747. The population density was 1,887.3 inhabitants per square mile (728.7/km^{2}). The racial makeup of Redlands was 47,452 (69.0%) White (54.0% Non-Hispanic White), 3,564 (5.2%) African American, 625 (0.9%) Native American, 5,216 (7.6%) Asian, 235 (0.3%) Pacific Islander, 8,266 (12.0%) from other races, and 3,389 (4.9%) from two or more races. Hispanic or Latino of any race were 20,810 persons (30.3%). There is an extensive Mexican-American community in Redlands.

The Census reported that 66,379 people (96.6% of the population) lived in households, 1,856 (2.7%) lived in non-institutionalized group quarters, and 512 (0.7%) were institutionalized.

There were 24,764 households, out of which 8,598 (34.7%) had children under the age of 18 living in them, 12,374 (50.0%) were opposite-sex married couples living together, 3,397 (13.7%) had a female householder with no husband present, 1,291 (5.2%) had a male householder with no wife present. There were 1,255 (5.1%) unmarried opposite-sex partnerships, and 164 (0.7%) same-sex married couples or partnerships. 6,083 households (24.6%) were made up of individuals, and 2,198 (8.9%) had someone living alone who was 65 years of age or older. The average household size was 2.68. There were 17,062 families (68.9% of all households); the average family size was 3.21.

The population was spread out, with 16,273 people (23.7%) under the age of 18, 8,185 people (11.9%) aged 18 to 24, 17,381 people (25.3%) aged 25 to 44, 17,930 people (26.1%) aged 45 to 64, and 8,978 people (13.1%) who were 65 years of age or older. The median age was 36.2 years. For every 100 females, there were 90.9 males. For every 100 females age 18 and over, there were 87.3 males.

There were 26,634 housing units at an average density of 731.2 per square mile (282.3/km^{2}), of which 15,061 (60.8%) were owner-occupied, and 9,703 (39.2%) were occupied by renters. The homeowner vacancy rate was 2.2%; the rental vacancy rate was 7.9%. 41,102 people (59.8% of the population) lived in owner-occupied housing units and 25,277 people (36.8%) lived in rental housing units.

During 2009–2013, Redlands had a median household income of $66,835, with 12.5% of the population living below the federal poverty line.

=== Religion ===
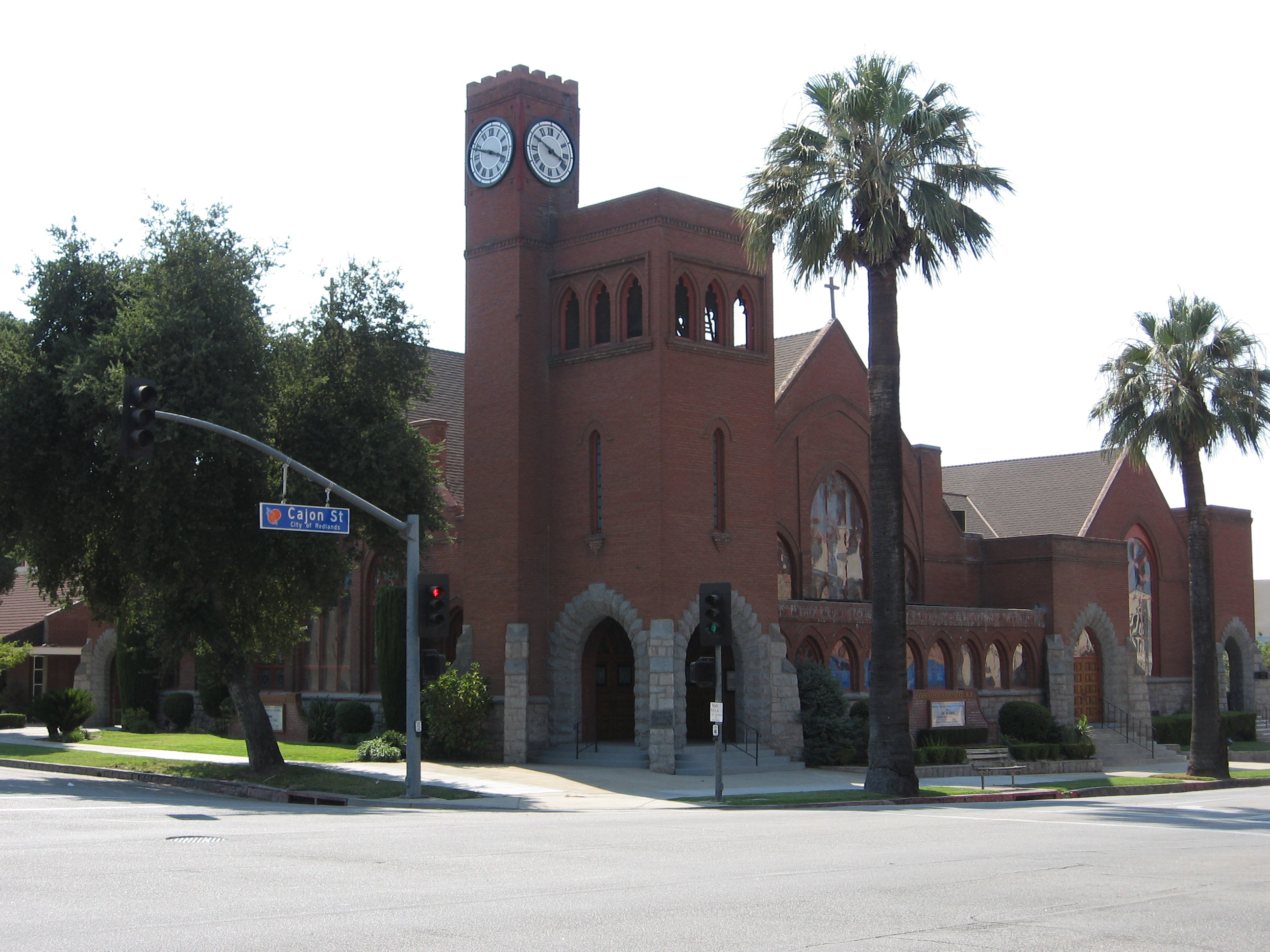
First Congregational Church

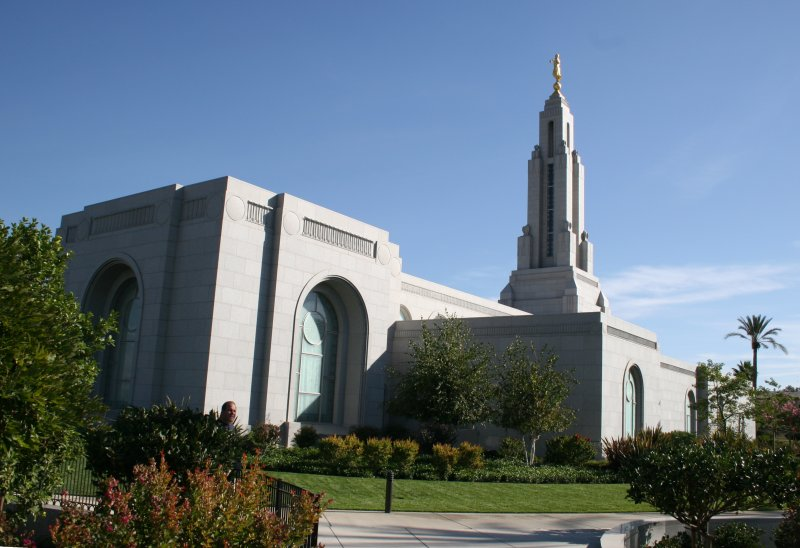
Redlands Temple of the LDS Church

Prior to European colonization, local tongva Serrano people practiced spirituality for millennia, web of life customs. The first known monotheistic religious establishment in Redlands, was of the Christian faith. The catholic San Bernardino de Sena Estancia by Francisco Dumetz was established in 1819 on the feast day of Saint Bernardine. Part of an outpost of the Mission San Gabriel Arcángel located 56 miles from Los Angeles, CA., a days trip walking. This outpost, was used to convert local native Tongva, Serrano, and Cahuilla Native Americans to christianity. With Spanish colonization and the subsequent Mexican era, San Bernardino Valley was a sparsely populated land grant rancho, considering it unsuitable for an actual mission. The estancia was later sold to José del Carmen Lugo who made it his home in 1842. The Catholic presence remains with the Holy Name of Jesus Catholic Church and the Discalced Carmelite Friars retreat compound established in 1952. Known as The Carmelo Retreat House.

Jose del Carmen later sold his land grant of the San Bernardino Valley, including the estancia to the Church of Jesus Christ of Latter-day Saints members Amasa Lyman and Charles C. Rich, establishing a Mormon colony in nearby San Bernardino, CA. Mormon presence remains in Redlands after the property was sold to Dr. Ben Barton in the late 1850s. The Redlands California Temple is the 116th operating temple of the Church of Jesus Christ of Latter-day Saints (LDS Church) and one of five LDS temples in Southern California.

Other variety of religions have a presence in Redlands, including a number of other Christian faiths, also Judaism, and Islam. There is a Redlands Area Interfaith Council. Redlands has a large Seventh-day Adventist population along with the neighboring town of Loma Linda.

Judaism Congregation, Emanu El, formerly located in nearby San Bernardino, dedicated its new building on Ford Street in Redlands in 2013. The Congregation claims to trace its history back to the 1850s.

== Economy ==
=== Major employers ===
According to the city's 2025 Annual Comprehensive Financial Report, the top employers in the city are:

#	Employer	# of employees
1	Redlands Unified School District	2,433
2	Esri	2,416
3	Redlands Community Hospital	1,847
4	Optum (Beaver Medical Group & Epic Mgmt)	1,000
5	City of Redlands	539
6	Amazon Fulfillment Center (Redlands)	526
7	University of Redlands	471
8	Loma Linda University Behavioral Medicine Center	458
9	Madison Grove Post Acute (Terracina Post Acute)	384
10	Kaiser Permanente Medical Offices	328

== Arts and culture ==
=== Historic structures ===
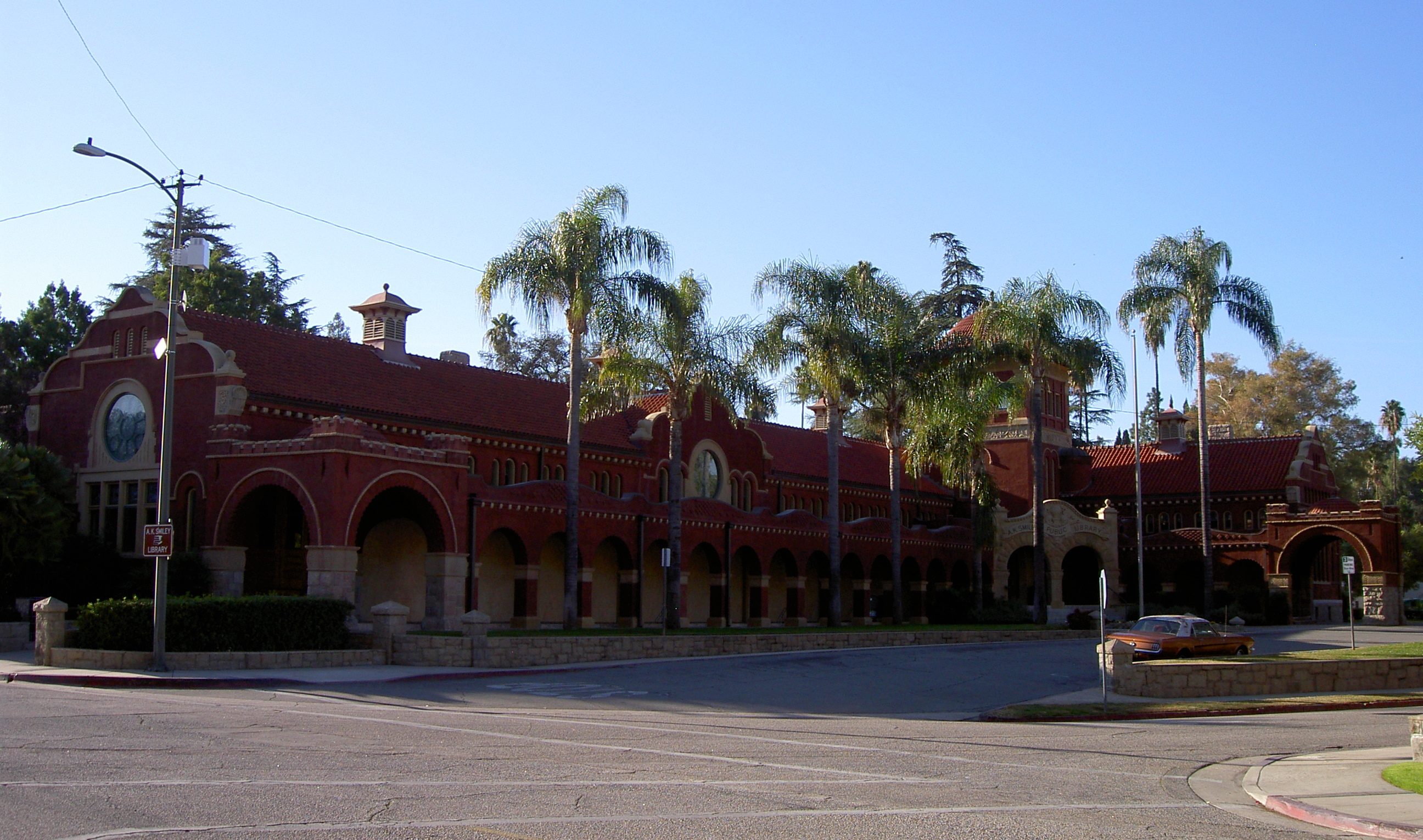
A.K. Smiley Public Library

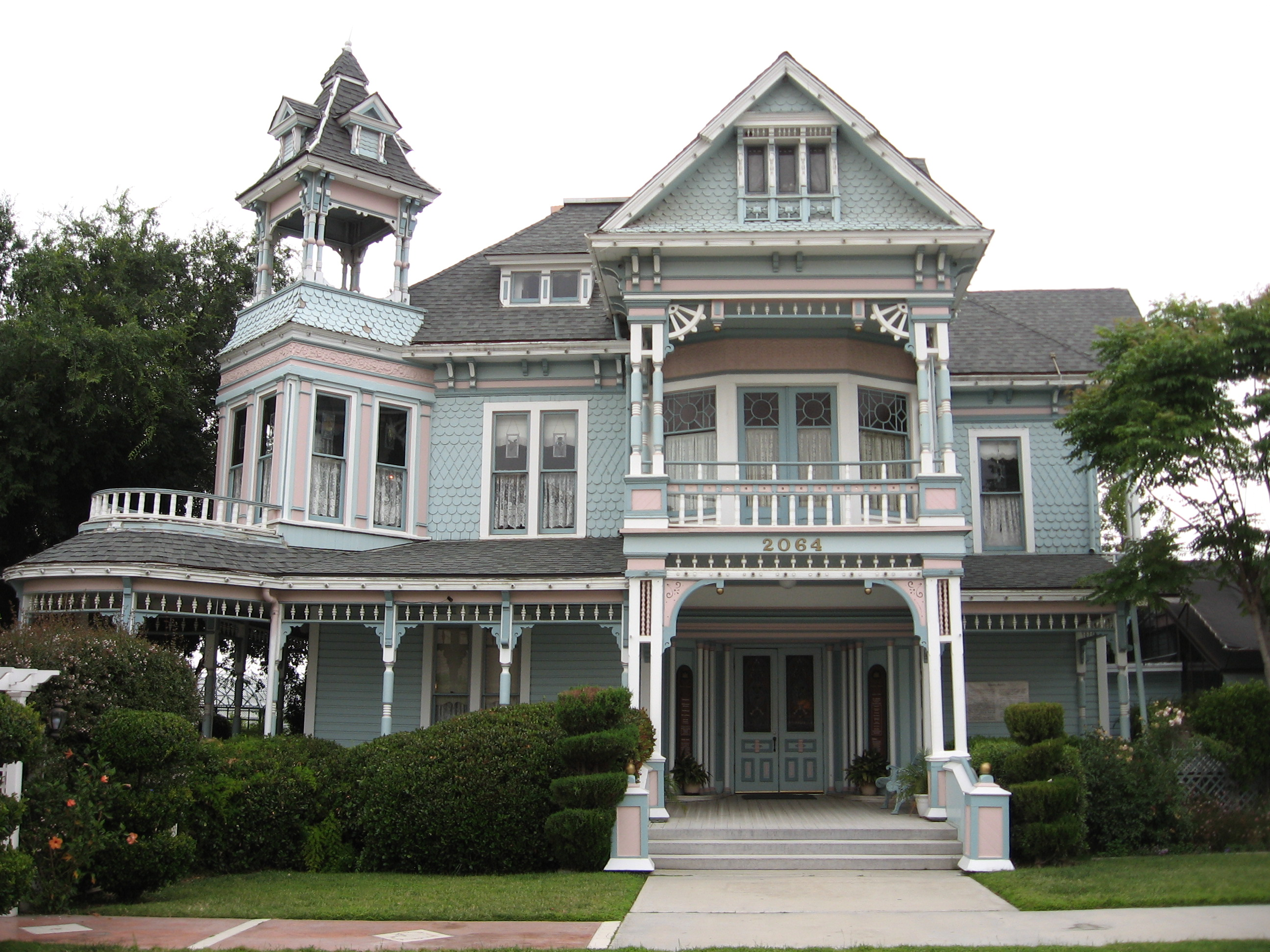
Edwards Mansion

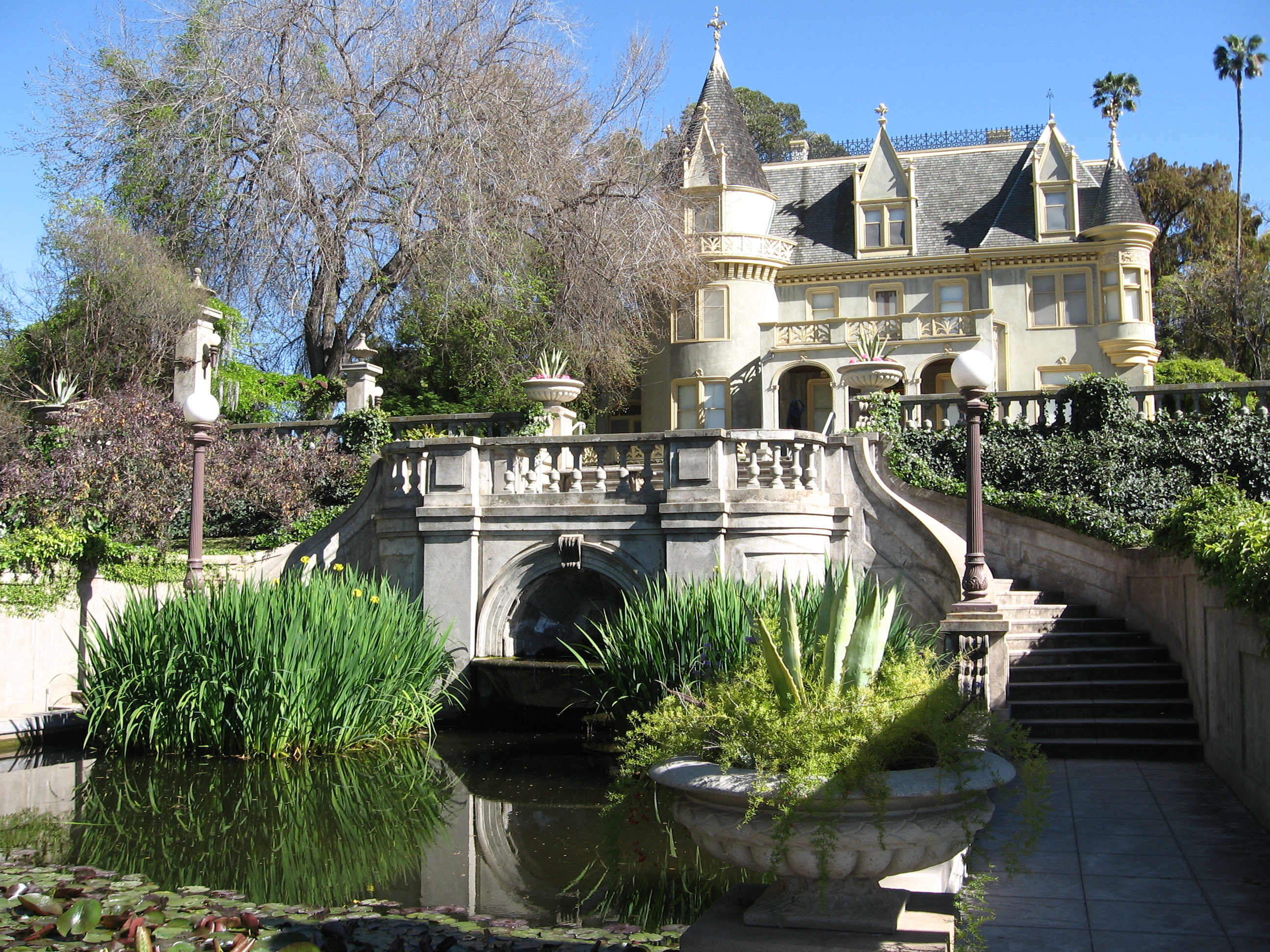
Kimberly Crest

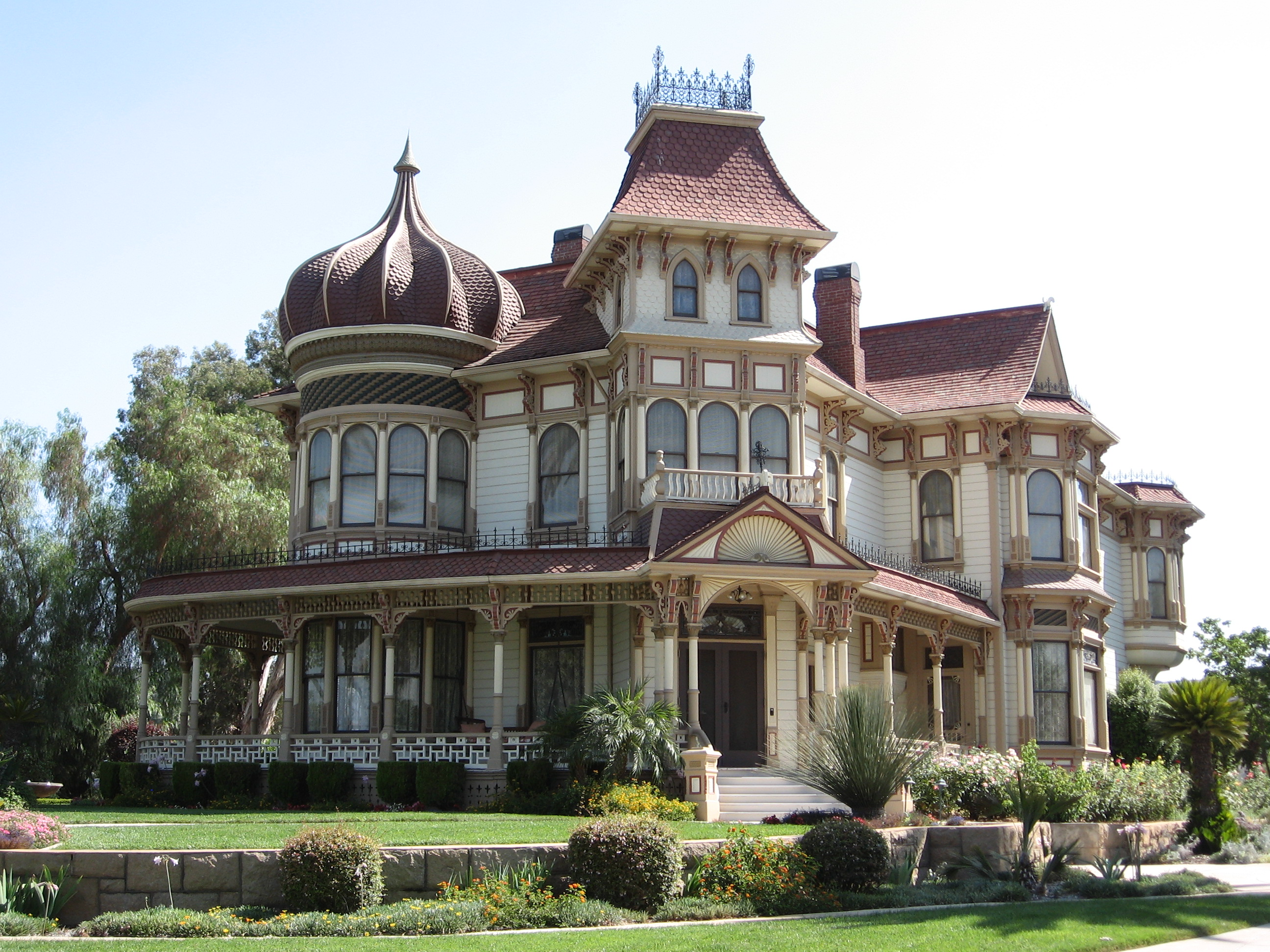
Morey Mansion

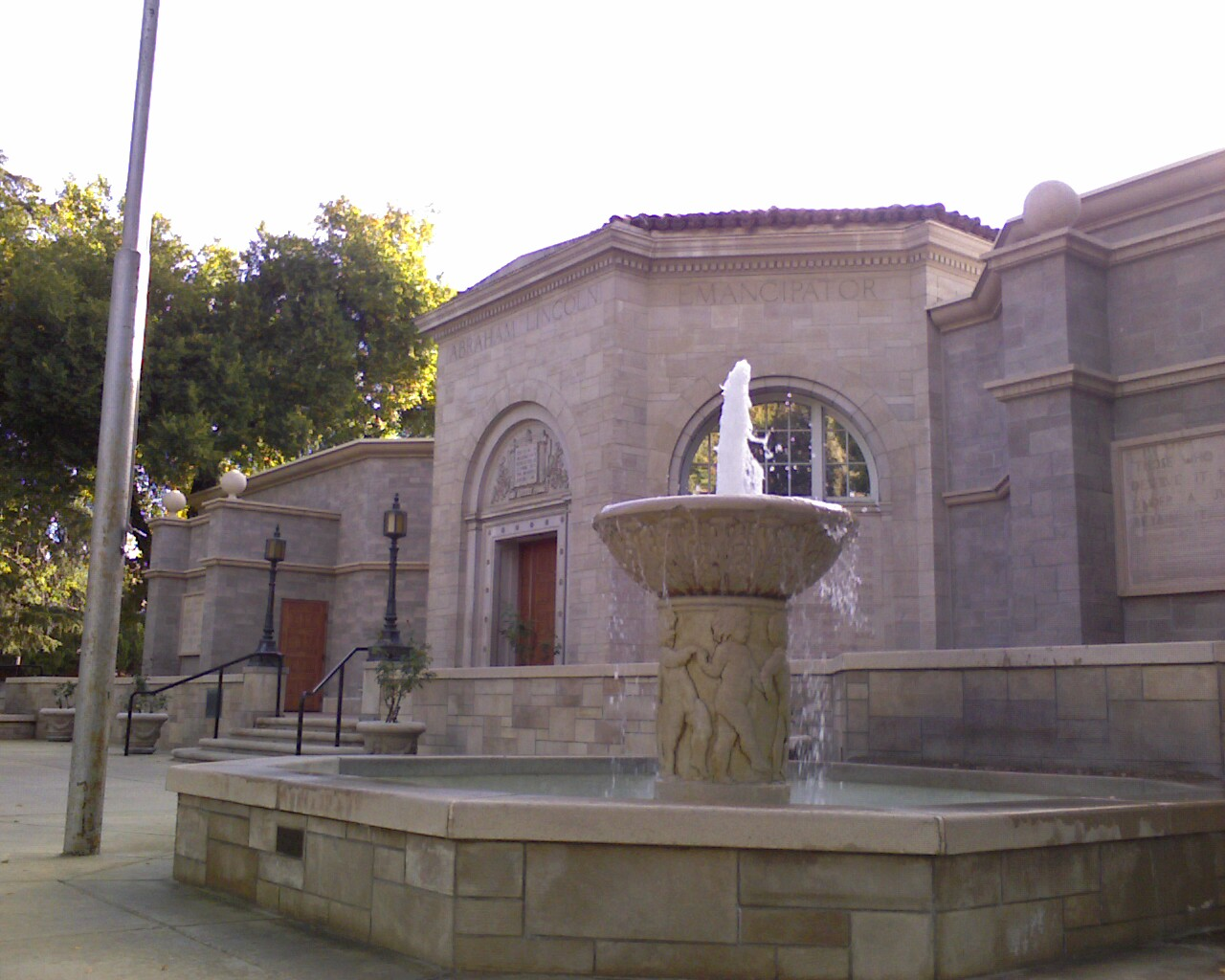
Lincoln Shrine

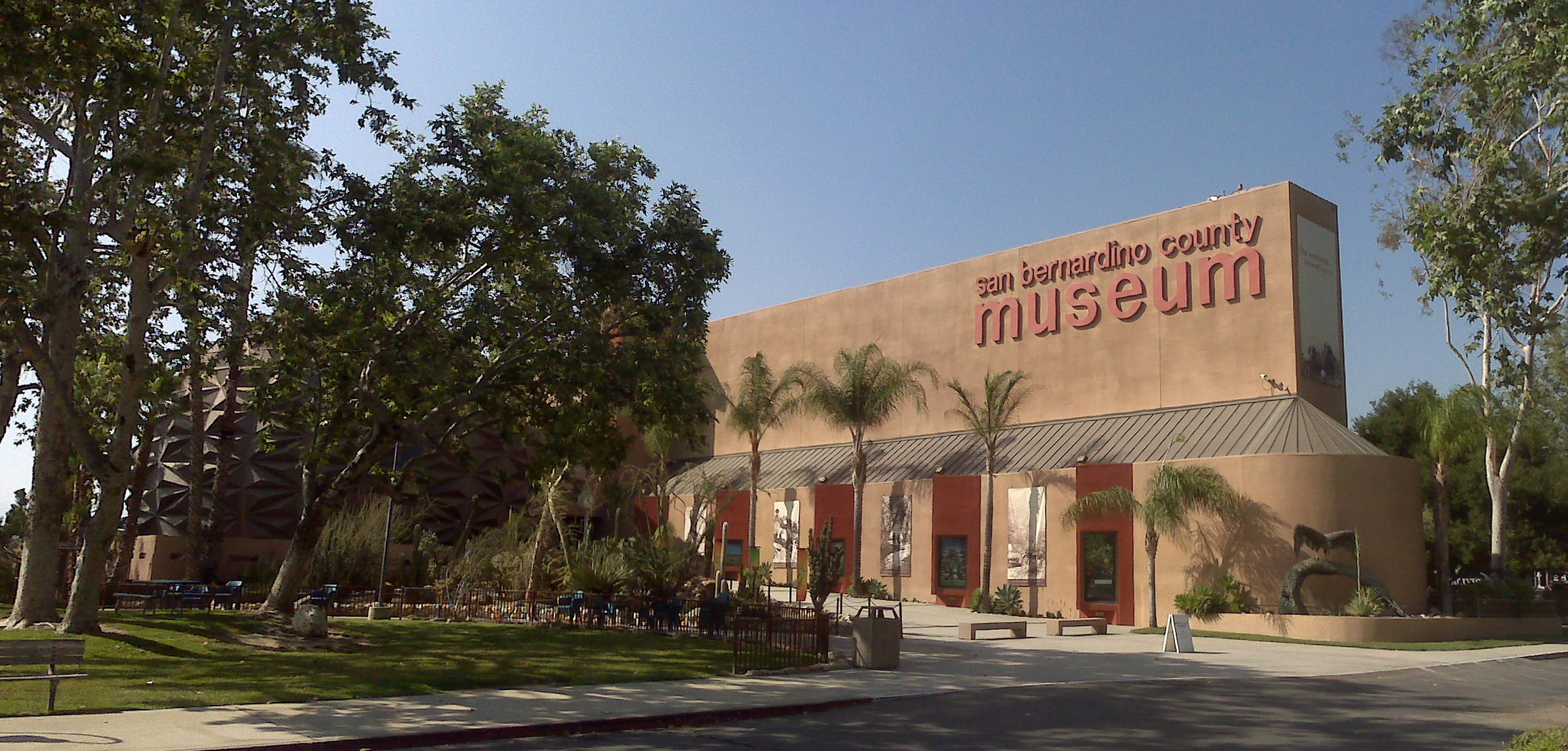
San Bernardino County Museum

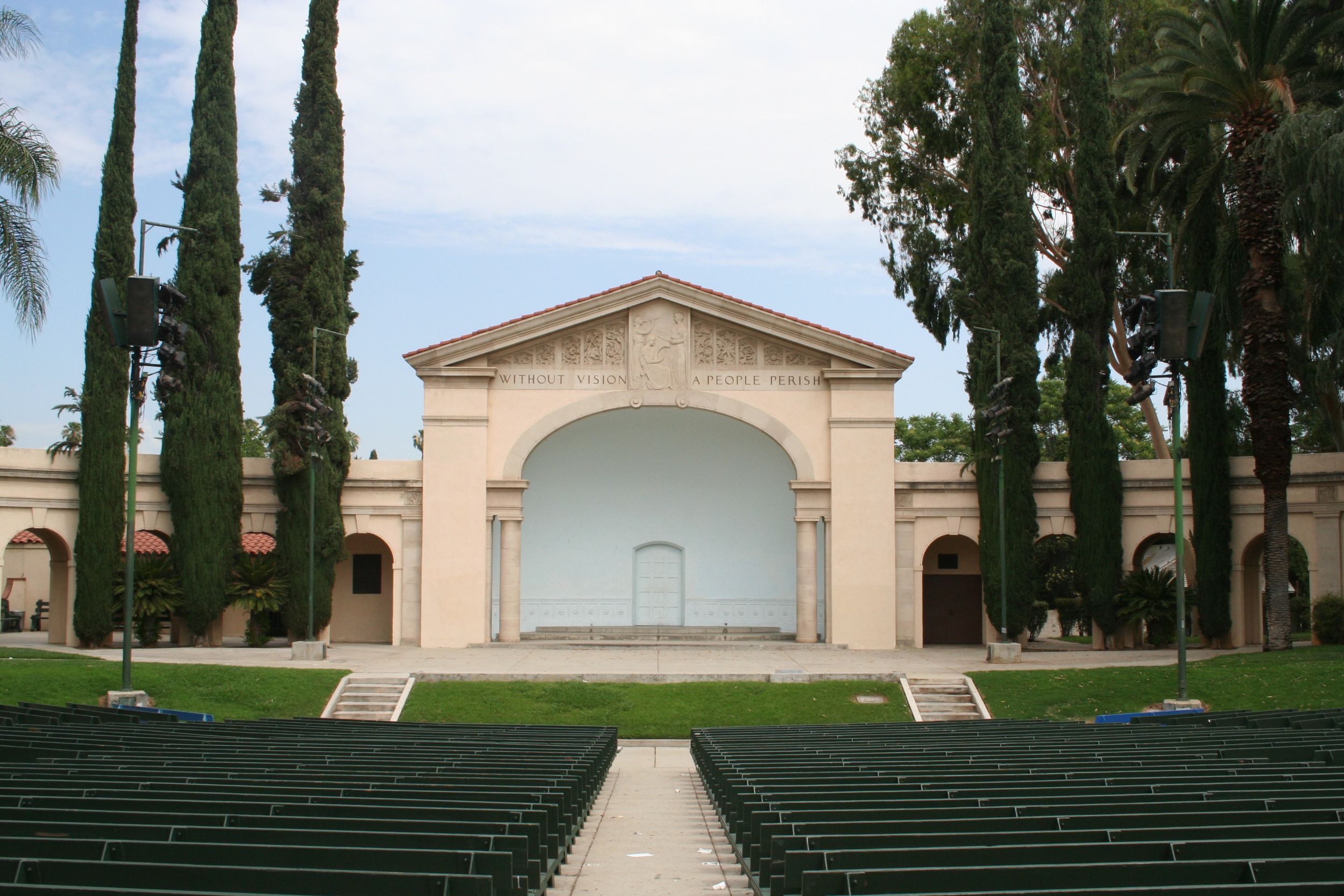
Redlands Bowl

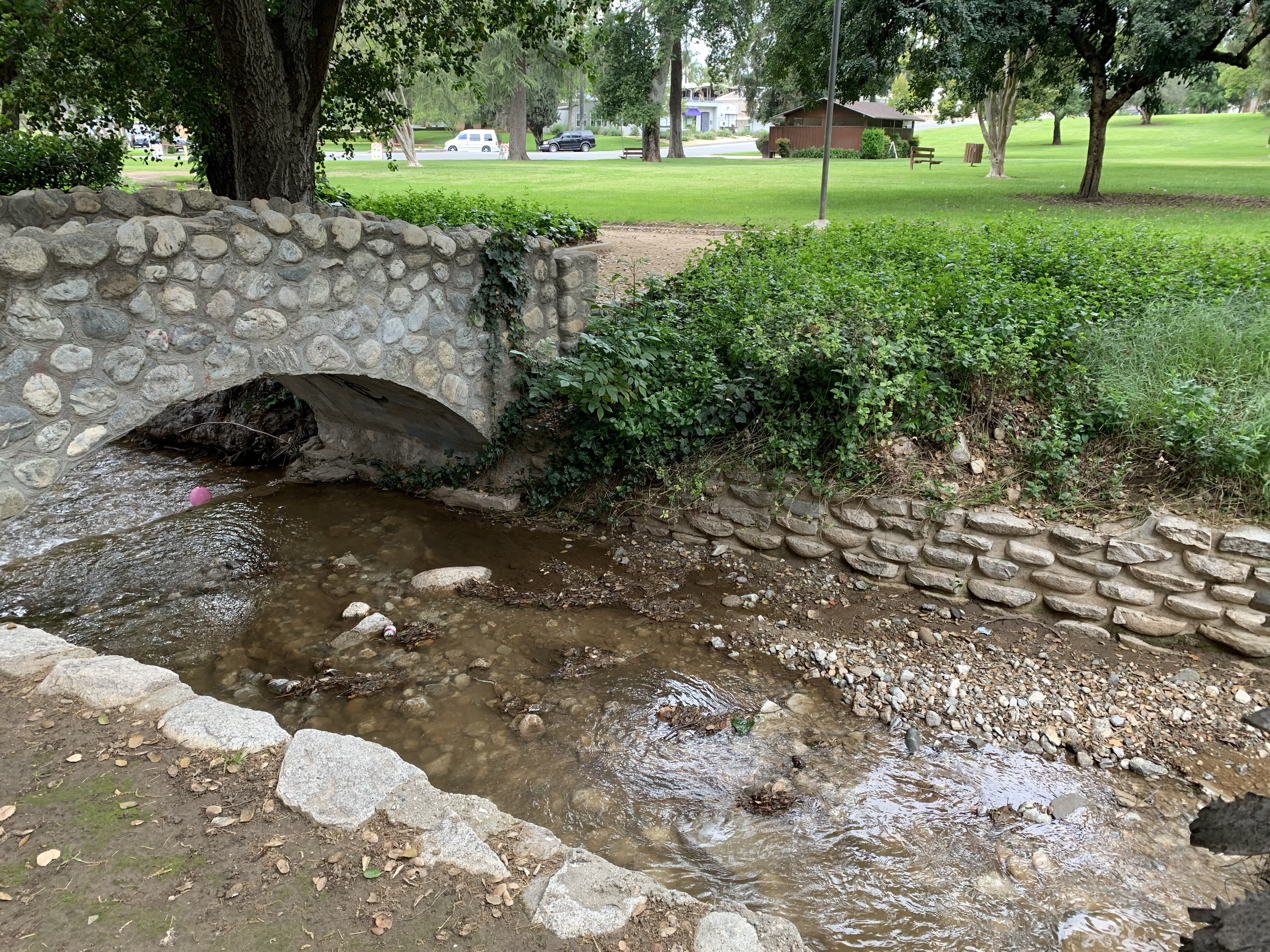
Zankey, at Sylvan Park

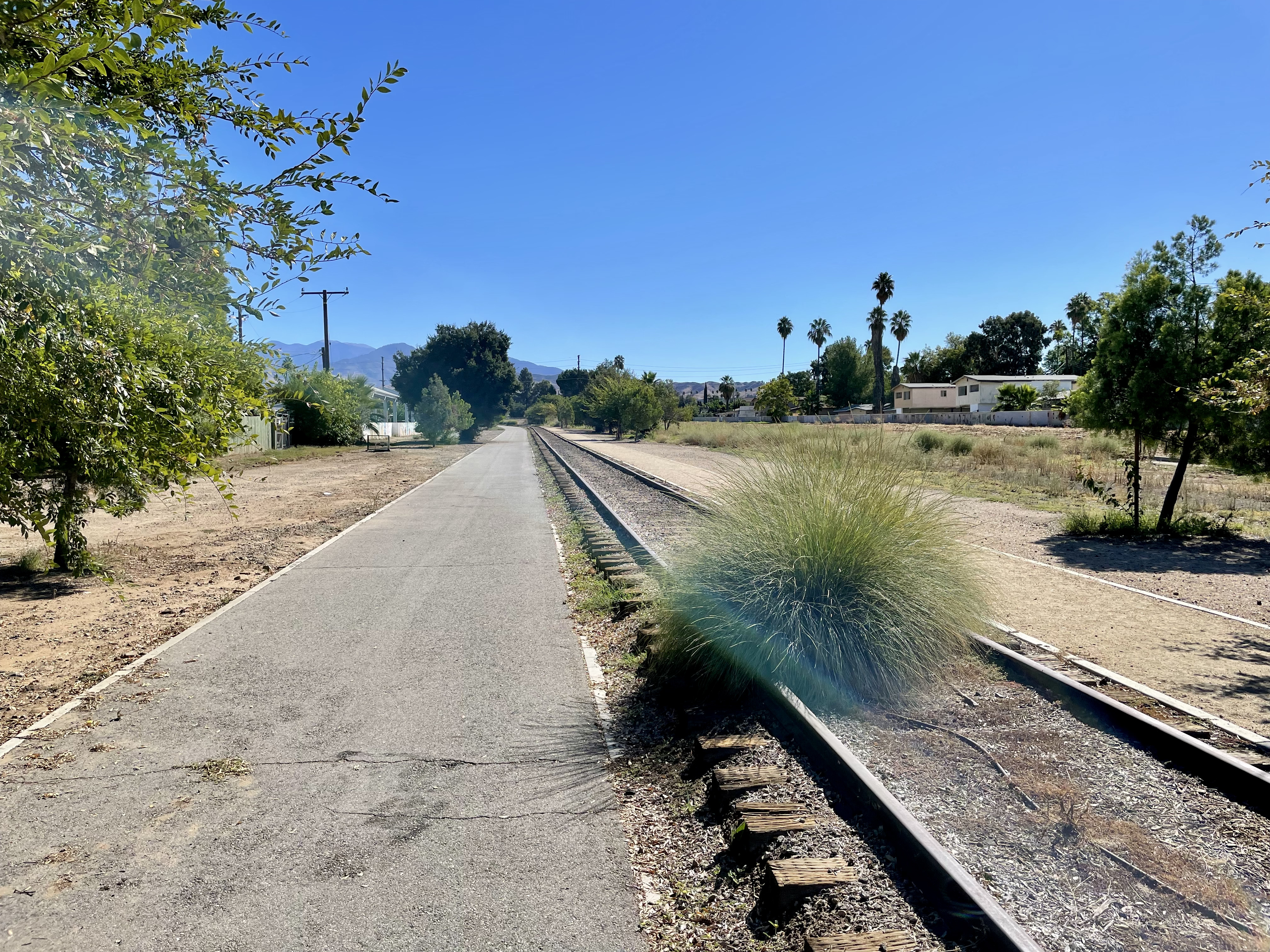
Orange Blossom Trail, east of the terminal rail, University Station

Sites listed on the National Register of Historic Places include:

- Auerbacher Home a Modernist house commissioned by Frederick and Mary Jane Auerbacher. It was designed by architect Richard Neutra in 1951.
- A. K. Smiley Public Library
- Beverly Ranch (Fisk-Burgess house)
- Kimberly Crest
- Mill Creek Zanja
- Redlands Central Railway Company Car Barn
- Redlands Santa Fe Depot District
- Smiley Park Historic District
- US Post Office-Redlands Main.

California Historical Landmarks include:

- A.K. Smiley Library
- Kimberly Crest House and Gardens, built in 1897.
- The San Bernardino de Sena Estancia
- The Zanja

Other historic sites include:

- Barton Villa, built in 1867, the oldest building in Redlands. Closed in the 1960s, it re-opened in 2008.
- Burrage Mansion, built in 1901 by industrialist Albert Cameron Burrage
- Edwards Mansion, built in 1890.
- Morey Mansion, built in 1890.

=== Museums ===
- The Lincoln Memorial Shrine is a museum and research facility dedicated to Abraham Lincoln and the American Civil War.
- The Museum of Redlands, located in the A. K. Smiley Library, features local history.
- Redlands Historical Glass Museum holds displays of American glassware dating from the early 19th century to contemporary times.
- San Bernardino County Museum is a regional museum featuring cultural and natural history. The museum operates the San Bernardino de Sena Estancia.

=== Theater and music ===
- Fox Event Center, formerly the Fox Theatre (1928), hosts live performances.
- The LifeHouse Theater is a Judeo-Christian community theater founded in 1993.
- Redlands Bowl Summer Festival, located at the Redlands Bowl, is the oldest continuously running music festival in the United States.
- Redlands Chamber Music Society holds performances at the Frederick Lowe Performance Hall.
- Redlands Footlighters is a volunteer community theater founded in 1945.
- Redlands Symphony performs through the academic year at the University of Redlands and during the summer at the Redlands Bowl.
- Redlands Theatre Festival is a summer volunteer community theater festival founded in 1972, that performs at Avice Meeker Sewall Theater in Prospect Park.
- Redlands Shakespeare Festival occurs each May at the Redlands Bowl.
- Redlands Bowl Summer Music Festival, established in 1924, is an outdoor performing arts festival.

=== Local attractions ===
- Downtown Redlands/Redlands Santa Fe Depot District: Bars, restaurants and packing house district retail plaza.
  - Redlands Public Market - Food Hall
  - Escape Craft Brewery: Local microbrewery located at the old 1906 Rondor Building in downtown Redlands.
  - J. Riley Distillery: Adjacent to Escape Brewery.
  - Redlands Mall: a former indoor shopping mall, now closed (except for a CVS Pharmacy), scheduled for demolition.
- Citrus Plaza/Mountain Grove: a large open-air shopping center.
- Pharaoh's Adventure Park: 20-acre (81,000 m^{2}) theme park, renamed Splash Kingdom Waterpark. The park was used by television filming, including a 2006 episode of C.S.I. Las Vegas featuring a rollercoaster accident. The park was demolished in 2020.

=== Local events ===
- Annual Redlands Professional Firefighters Association Car Show, every Memorial Day weekend in downtown, since 2000.
- Community 4 July Celebration, was one of the largest Independence Day event in California.
- Lincoln Pilgrimage, held each February, attracts more than a thousand Scouts and other youth to honor the ideals and life of President Abraham Lincoln.
- Traditional Christmas Parade, and New Years "orange drop" in downtown, a play on the ball drop tradition.

== Sports ==
- Redlands Triathlon/Duathlon, your choice of a 5K run/10 mile bike/100 yard swim or a 5K run/10 mile bike/5K run-walk through Redlands held each February.
- Run through Redlands, established in 1984, one of the biggest running events in the Inland Empire area including a kinder-dash, 5K, 10K, and a half-marathon, is held yearly each March.
- The Redlands Bicycle Classic, the longest running professional bicycle stage race in the United States, since 1985.
- Redlands annual "Turkey Trot", a Thanksgiving Day themed 5k around the University of Redlands, since 2013.
- The Redlands Country Club, a private golf course in southern Redlands area.
- One team represents Redlands in a semi professional league, the USL League Two. Founded in 2022.

Club	League	Sport	Venue	Established	Championships
Redlands Football Club	USL League Two	Association football	Dodge Stadium at Redlands High School	2022	0

== Parks and recreation ==
The city of Redlands owns and operates 24 public parks totaling more than 143 acres (0.58 km^{2}), and 10 city-approved trails.

== Government ==
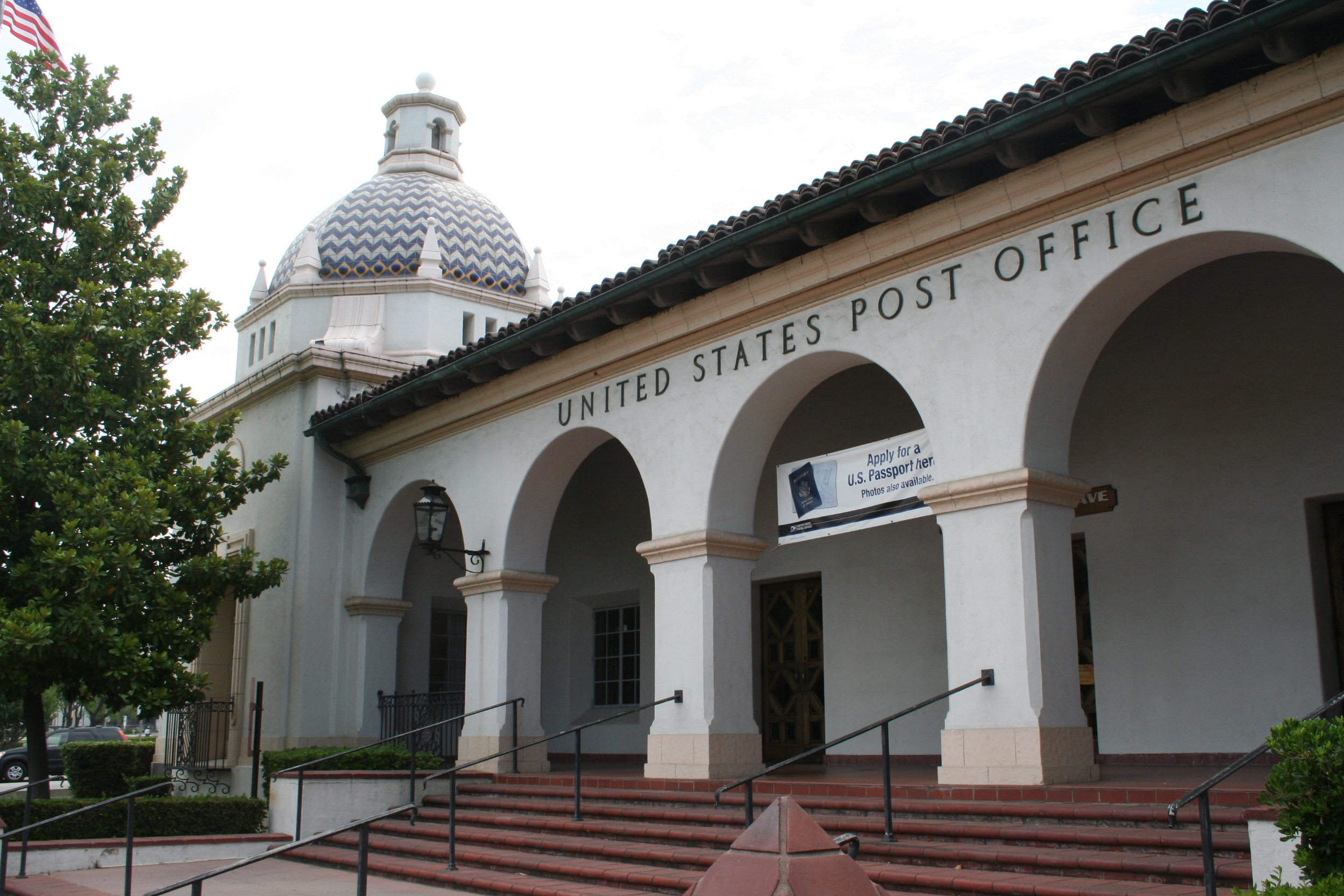
Post Office, erected in the 1930s by the Works Progress Administration.

=== Federal ===
Redlands is represented in the United States Senate by Democrats Alex Padilla and Adam Schiff.

In the United States House of Representatives, Redlands is split between California's 33rd congressional district, represented by Democrat Pete Aguilar, and California's 23rd congressional district, represented by Republican Jay Obernolte.

=== State ===
In the California State Legislature, Redlands is split between the 19th senatorial district, represented by Republican Rosilicie Ochoa Bogh, and the 29th senatorial district, represented by Democrat Eloise Reyes.

In the California State Assembly, Redlands is split into three. All of North Redlands above I-10 is represented by the 45th Assembly district, represented by Democrat James Ramos. Downtown and southwest Redlands by the 50th Assembly district, represented by Democrat Robert Garcia and southeast Redlands area by the 47th Assembly district, represented by Republican Greg Wallis.

=== Municipal government ===
Redlands is a general law city that uses the council–manager form of government. Council members were elected at-large prior to 2018, now per council district in accordance to state law. The mayor and mayor-pro-tempore are not directly elected, but are chosen by the council. The mayor is Mario Saucedo.

== Education ==
=== Higher education ===
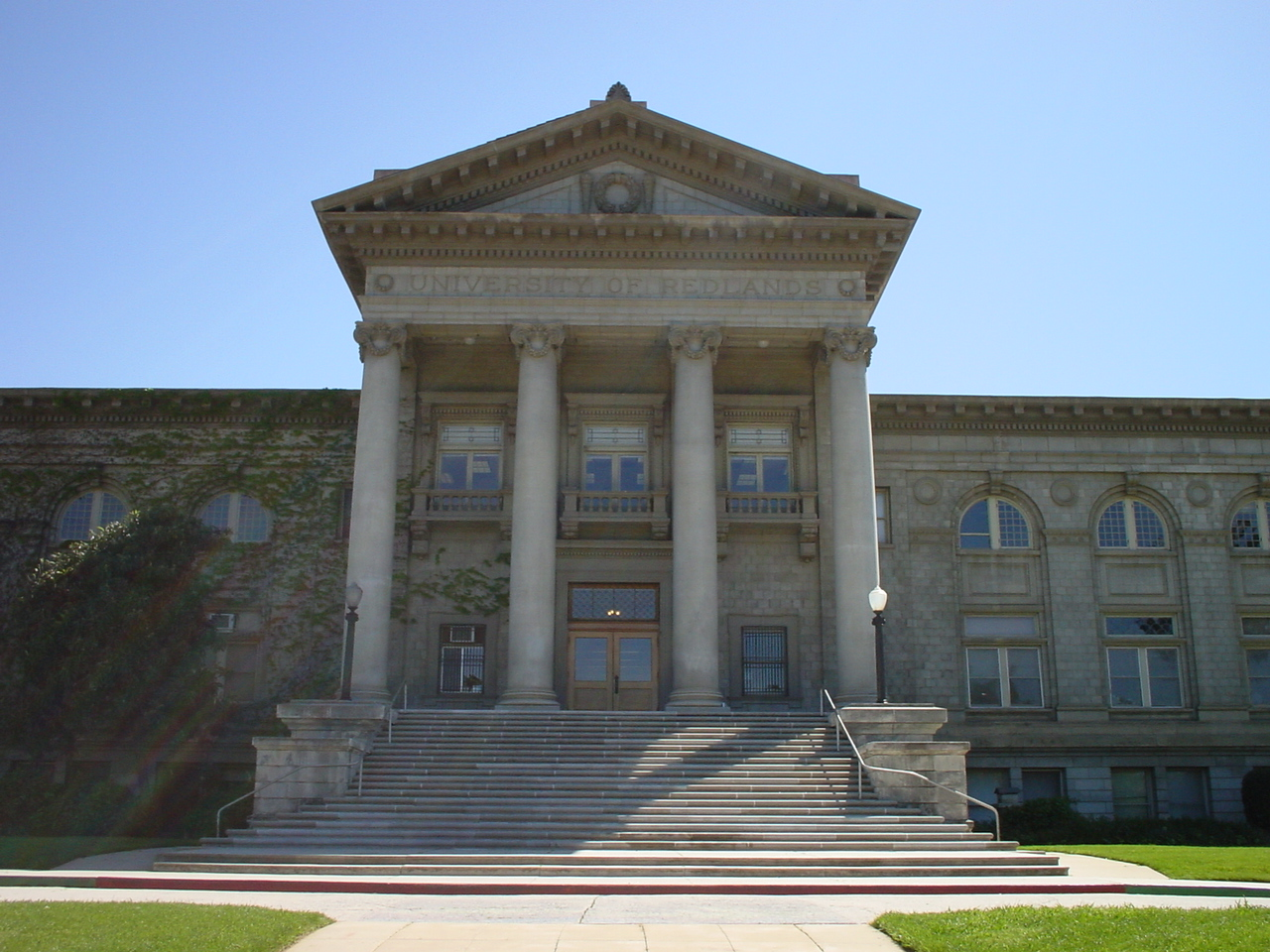
University of Redlands

- University of Redlands
- Esri Learning Center
- Community Christian College

=== Public education ===
Public education is administered by the Redlands Unified School District. Notable schools include:

- Citrus Valley High School
- Redlands East Valley High School
- Redlands High School

=== Private education ===
- Christ the King Lutheran Church and School
- Arrowhead Christian Academy
- Redlands Adventist Academy
- Sacred Heart Academy

== Transportation ==
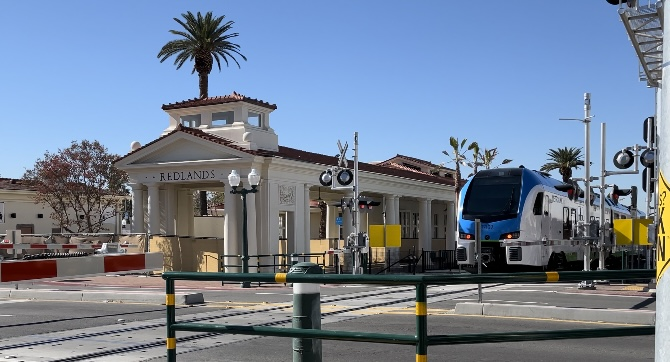
Redlands train station (1909), designed by architect Arthur Brown, Jr. in 2022.

=== Road ===
Highways include:

- Interstate 10 (the San Bernardino Freeway). In the 1950s, three routes for the new freeway were considered: north Redlands adjacent the Santa Ana River (the Lugonia-Sand Canyon route); a center route through the city; and a southern alignment through San Timoteo Canyon, paralleling the Southern Pacific railroad tracks (the San Timoteo-Live Oak Canyon route). The central route was finalized in 1957, and opened in 1962, replacing US Route 99 now Redlands Boulevard.
- State Route 210 (the Foothill Freeway).

San Bernardino-based Omnitrans bus system services Redlands.

=== Rail ===
- Arrow operates a commuter rail service from the University of Redlands to San Bernardino with three stops in Redlands. Service began in 2022.
- The San Bernardino Line of the Greater Los Angeles regional transportation system Metrolink services Redlands–Downtown station.

=== Airports ===
- Redlands Municipal Airport is a general aviation airport.
- San Bernardino International Airport, the former Norton Air Force Base.

== Cemetery ==
Hillside Memorial Park Cemetery, established in 1886 as a private cemetery, was acquired by the city in 1918.

== Notable people ==
- Pete Aguilar, U.S. congressman, former Mayor of Redlands
- Matt Andriese, professional baseball player for Boston Red Sox
- Ashley Argota, actress
- Joan Baez, folk singer and songwriter
- Brian Billick, head coach of NFL's Baltimore Ravens 1999–2007, television commentator
- Brant Bjork, singer, songwriter, musician
- Harry Blackstone Jr., professional magician
- Hugh "Lumpy" Brannum, actor, Mr. Green Jeans on Captain Kangaroo show
- Tyler Chatwood, former MLB starting pitcher for the Chicago Cubs
- Barney Childs, composer
- Ryan Christenson, MLB player for four teams, minor-league manager
- Tyler Clary, born in Redlands, won men's 200-meter backstroke at 2012 London Olympics
- Jack Dangermond, founder of Esri
- Landon Donovan, professional soccer player for Los Angeles Galaxy and US National Team
- Skip Ewing, country music star
- James Fallows, journalist for The Atlantic Monthly
- Davey Faragher, musician with Elvis Costello
- John Mack Faragher, American historian and author
- Helen G. Fisk (1895–1986), vocational services executive
- Tommy Hanson, professional baseball player for Los Angeles Angels
- Johnny Hickman, musician, guitarist for Cracker
- Garner Holt, animatronics engineer for Disney.
- Antoinette Humphreys, librarian in Redlands, Merced County, Colusa County
- Brion James, actor in films such as Blade Runner and 48 Hrs.
- Patrick Johnson, professional football player Baltimore Ravens
- John Jorgenson, guitar virtuoso with Desert Rose Band, the Hellecasters, the John Jorgenson Quintet, and six-year member of Elton John's tour band; attended Moore Junior High, and Redlands High School
- James LeGros, actor
- Harlan Lewis, Award-winning botanist and UCLA Dean of Life Sciences
- Jerry Lewis, former congressman, ranking member of the House Appropriations Committee
- Lil Xan, rapper
- David Lowery, musician, lead singer for Camper Van Beethoven and Cracker
- Greta N. Morris, former United States Ambassador to Republic of the Marshall Islands
- Ian Murphy, soccer player
- Doris Niles, dancer, choreographer
- Kye Palmer, trumpet player and studio musician
- DeWayne Patterson, football player
- Leah Pritchett, NHRA Top Fuel driver
- Eric Pierpoint, actor
- Dorothea Puente, serial killer
- Michael A. Rogers, author, futurist
- Benji Schwimmer, winner of second season of So You Think You Can Dance
- Lacey Schwimmer, professional dancer on Dancing with the Stars
- Stephen Shadegg, political consultant in Phoenix, Arizona, associated in particular with Barry Goldwater; reared in Redlands
- Mark R. Shepherd, Democratic Party activist and politician
- Naomi Smalls, drag queen and finalist on RuPaul's Drag Race Season 8
- J.D.B. Stillman, author and physician
- Dave Stockton, professional golfer, two-time PGA Championship winner
- Dave Stockton Jr., professional golfer
- Dan Straily (born 1988), starting pitcher in the Philadelphia Phillies organization
- Tim Tackett, martial artist
- Mark Teahen, Major League Baseball player 2005-11
- Joan Tewkesbury, film director
- The Tornadoes, surf rock band featured on Pulp Fiction soundtrack
- Brett Waterman, home preservationist and host of DIY Network's Restored
- Tom Wheeler, 31st Chairman of Federal Communications Commission
- Josh Whitesell, MLB player for Arizona Diamondbacks
- Frances E. Willis, U.S. diplomat.

== In popular culture ==
- The sitcom Cheers was inspired by a now-defunct pizza-parlor/bar in Redlands called "The Gay 90s"

== Sister cities ==
Redlands has two sister cities, as designated by Sister Cities International:

- Hino, Japan
- San Miguel de Allende, Mexico

== See also ==
- Greater Los Angeles Area
- Inland Empire Metropolitan Area
