= Citrus Plaza =

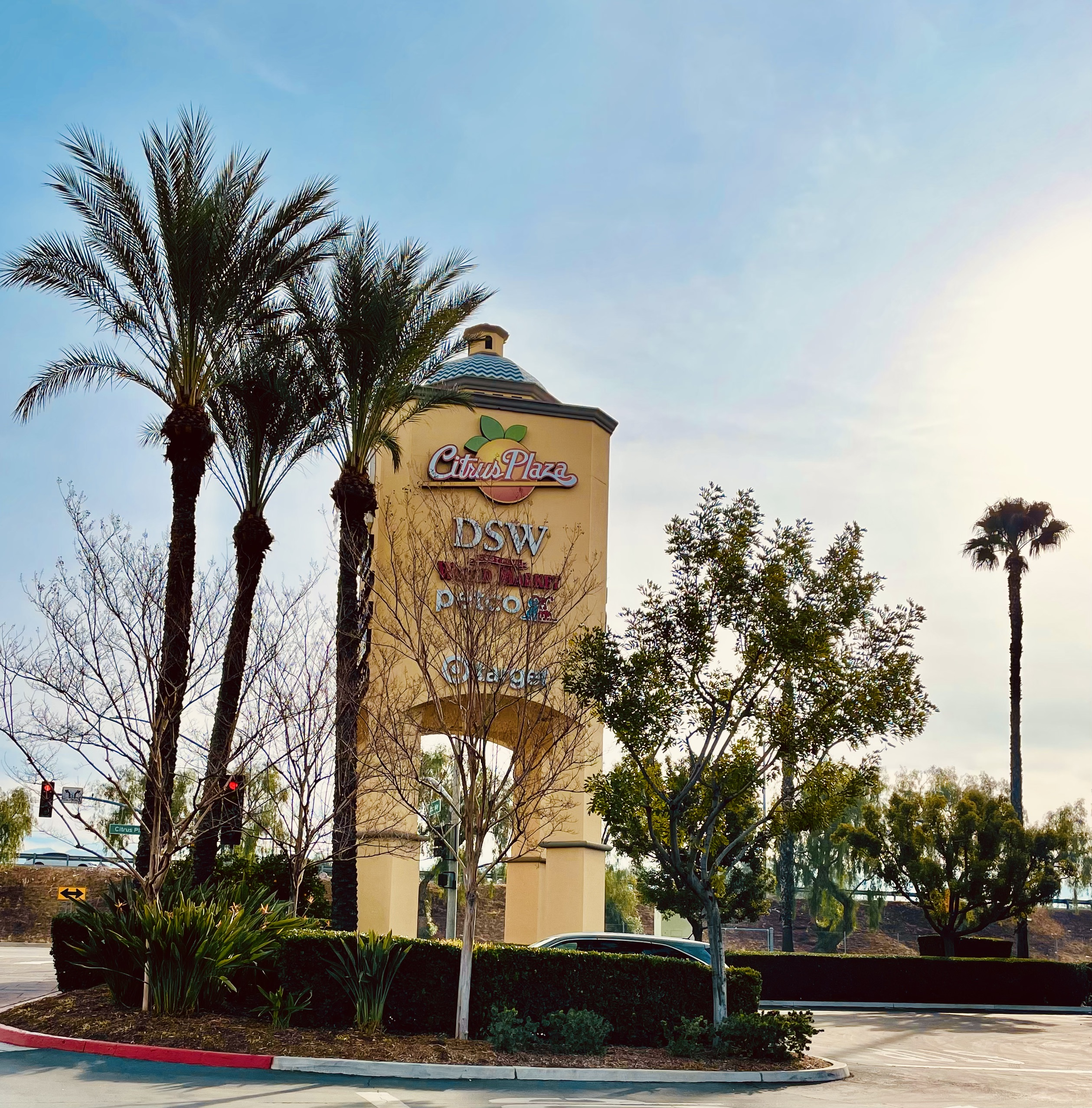
- Location: Unincorporated San Bernardino County, surrounded by Redlands, California, United States
- Opened: 2003
- Developer: Majestic Realty Co.
- Website: www.citrusplaza.com

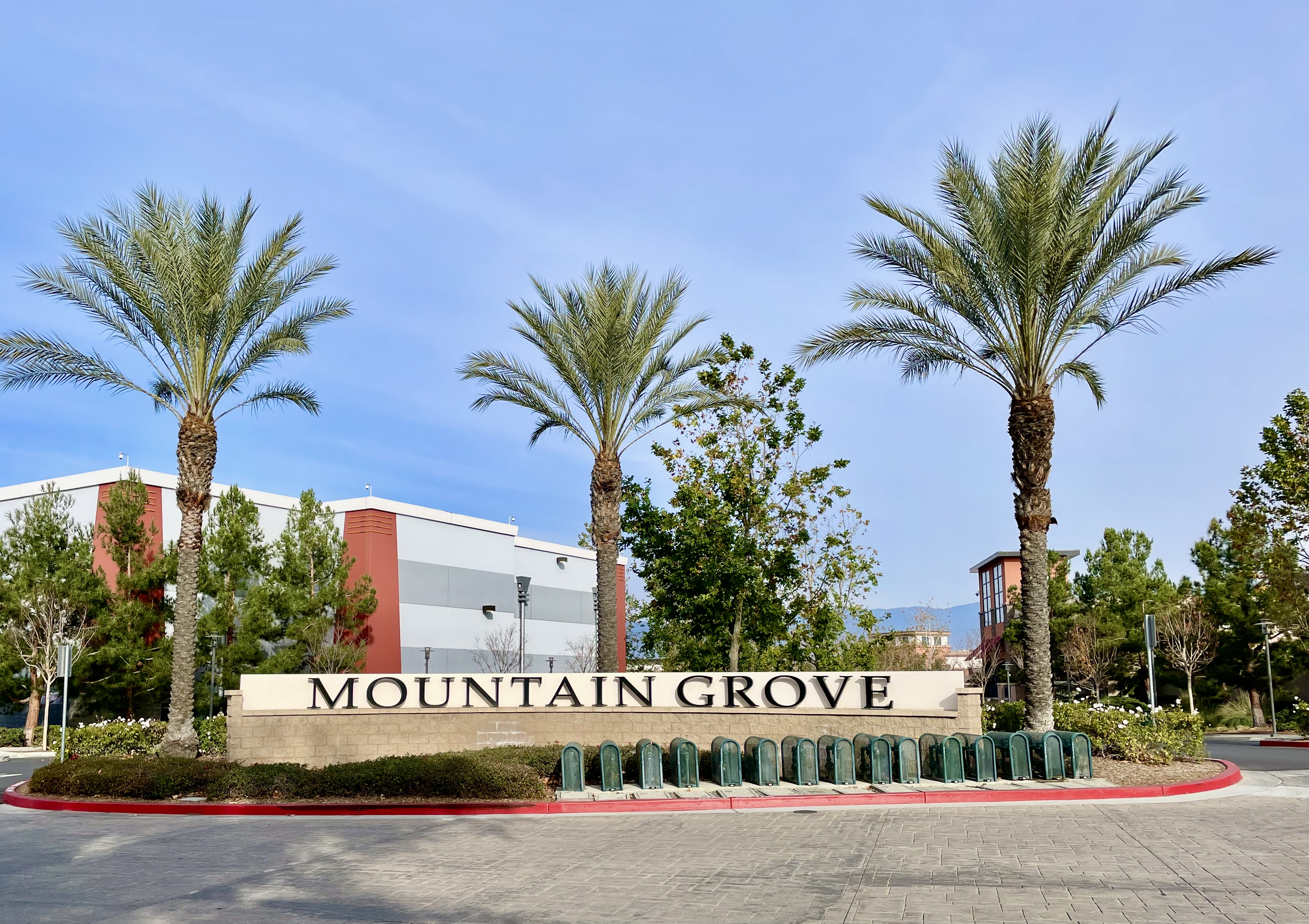
Mountain Grove section of Citrus Plaza.

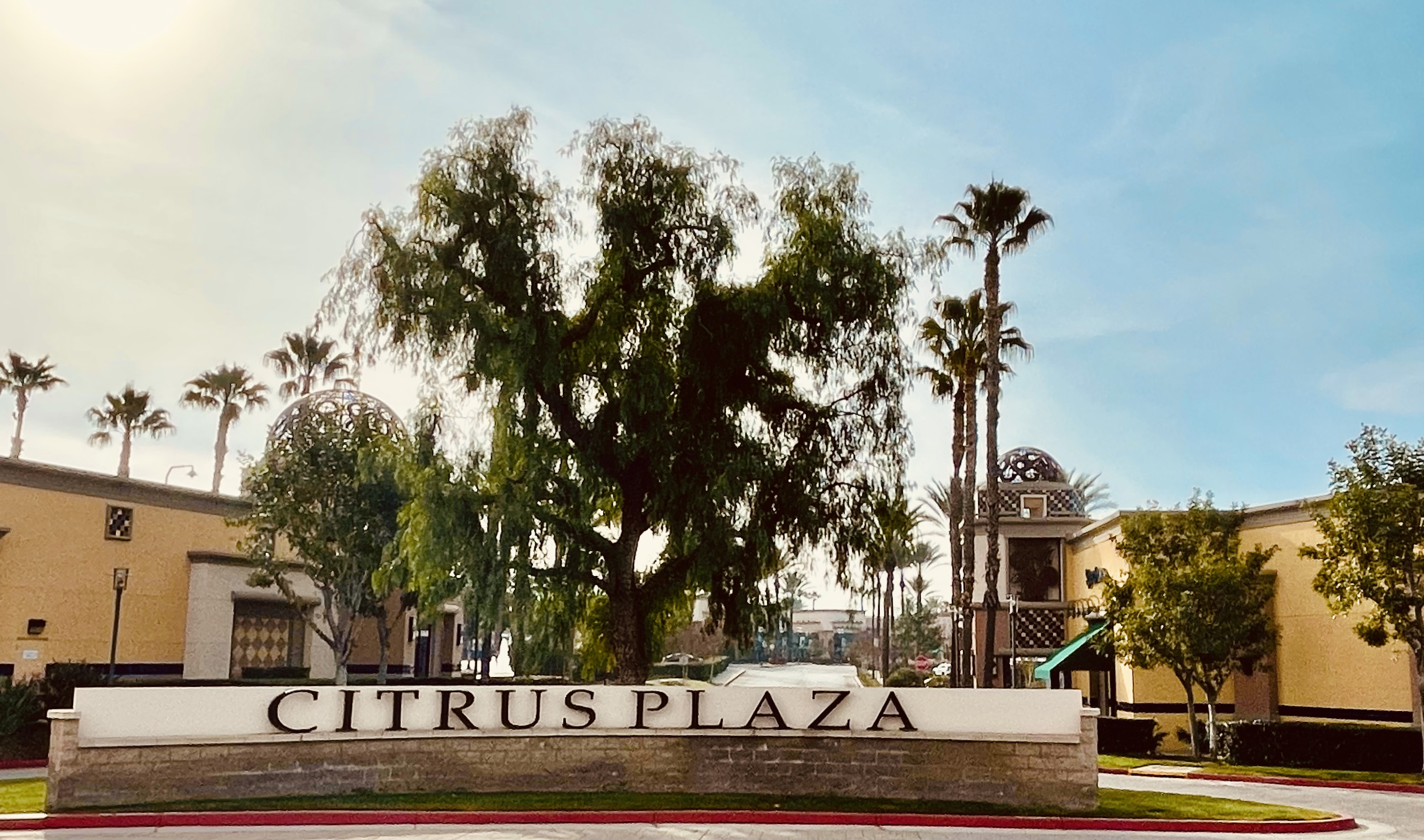
Citrus Plaza section of Citrus Plaza.

Citrus Plaza, along with the adjacent and contiguous Mountain Grove shopping center located in Redlands, California, United States, are owned by Majestic Realty Co. It consists of 520,000 square feet of retail and restaurant space, anchored by Target, Kohl’s, Barnes & Noble at Citrus Plaza and Nordstrom Rack, Hobby Lobby, Ulta and Nike at Mountain Grove. The entire shopping center sits on 53 acres of a 120-acre master planned super block. Citrus Plaza opened in 2004-05. and Mountain Grove opened in 2015.

== History ==
The large city block known colloquially as the "doughnut hole", is an approximately 1,000-acre (4.0 km^{2}) unincorporated area surrounded by the city of Redlands in southwestern San Bernardino County, California. Citrus groves and farmland were scattered throughout the area since the 19th century.

The city of Redlands began making public works improvements in the 1970s, after the county's Local Agency Formation Commission indicated the city would eventually be allowed to annex the area. Majestic Realty acquired the majority of the land and proposed the Citrus Plaza shopping center in 1993. Negotiations with the city government through the 1990s deteriorated into legal disputes. Majestic Realty successfully lobbied the state government to pass a law in 2000 removing Redlands' control over the area. Local governments and Majestic Realty came to a settlement in 2000, and the center opened in 2003.

In 2003, voters in Redlands passed Measure N, a tax-sharing agreement that allocates 90% of sales tax generated in the Donut Hole to the city, and the remainder to the county. By 2023, the city is receiving 100% of the sales tax revenue.

An expansion called Mountain Grove at Citrus Plaza opened in 2015.

== Description ==
Citrus Plaza is a 100% leased property. It is highly visible from the Foothill (I-210) and San Bernardino (I-10) freeways. It is located in the "Donut Hole", an enclave of unincorporated San Bernardino County territory within Redlands. The shopping center opened in 2003 after controversy over its location. County officials pushed the planning process thru county approval negating Redlands city officials.

The shopping center comprises department stores, shops, restaurants, a Harkins movie theater, a Nike store and 281 residential units, The Summit Apartments opened in 2018. Retail anchors are Kohl's, Target, Barnes and Noble, Hobby Lobby, Banana Republic and Nordstrom. There are events throughout the year such as the tree lighting and Santa during the holiday season. A 110-room Marriot hotel and a Aldi grocery store were added in 2021. The Target was remodeled into a Super Target in 2022.
