= Mentone, California =

Mentone
- census-designated place
- Motto: Home of "Oranges on the Rocks"
- Location in San Bernardino County and the state of California

- Location in the United States
- Coordinates: 34°04′12″N 117°08′04″W
- Country: United States
- State: California
- County: San Bernardino

Area
  - Total: 6.122 sq mi (15.857 km^{2})
  - Land: 6.110 sq mi (15.826 km^{2})
  - Water: 0.012 sq mi (0.031 km^{2}) 0.19%
- Elevation: 1,650 ft (503 m)

Population (2020)
  - Total: 9,557
  - Density: 1,564/sq mi (603.9/km^{2})
- Time zone: UTC-8 (PST)
  - Summer (DST): UTC-7 (PDT)
- ZIP code: 92359
- Area code: 909
- FIPS code: 06-46884
- GNIS feature IDs: 1661008, 2408816
- Website: www.mentonechamber.com

Mentone is a census-designated place in the Inland Empire region of San Bernardino County, California, United States. The population was 9,557 at the 2020 census, up from 8,720 at the 2010 census.

According to the United States Census Bureau, it has a total area of 6.1 square miles (16 km^{2}); 6.1 square miles (16 km^{2}) of it is land and 0.19% is water. Lugonia Avenue as California State Route 38 serves as its main street, being called Mentone Boulevard upon entering Mentone from Redlands on the west side, then changes to Mill Creek Road on the east end. Route 38 through Mentone serves as one of three gateways to the San Bernardino Mountains.

== History ==
William H. Drew and Nathaniel Kellog "N.K." Fairbanks formed Mentone Corporation in 1886. They purchased 3,000 acres east of Lugonia colony and north of Crafton colony on the south bank of the Santa Ana River. Within the year, The Santa Fe Railroad also established a stop in 1886. William P. McIntosh surveyed the land for the Mentone corporation and bought most of the land himself. He named the city streets for earth gemstones north–south, and after beach resorts east–west.

It was named for Menton, France. A map for the Mentone townsite was filed on February 24, 1888. The Mentone Post Office was opened on May 15, 1891. The Mentone Hotel opened in 1892 and advertised as an inland beach resort with postcards showcasing a full river with sailing boats. The Santa Fe route was part of a tourist route named the "Kite-Shaped Track" from Los Angeles with stops in nearby Riverside, Redlands and San Bernardino. The Mentone Hotel did not prosper and immediately converted into a sanitarium for people with tuberculosis and asthma by 1900. The hotel closed its doors in 1917.

Navel orange groves and olive trees became popular in the area. Nearby colonies of Lugonia, Crafton, and Redlands incorporated into the city of Redlands in 1888. The area and most acreages became fruit tree crops. Mentone did not incorporate with Redlands and remains a county jurisdiction with a population near 10,000. Residents colloquially call the town "Mentone Beach".

Mentone has a large Portuguese American population from Santa Maria de Azores. They have celebrated the yearly "La Festo do Espírito Santo" since 1919.

== Demographics ==
Historical population
Census	Pop.	Note	%±
1990	5,675		—
2000	7,803		37.5%
2010	8,720		11.8%
2020	9,557		9.6%
U.S. Decennial Census; 1850–1870 1880-1890; 1900 1910 1920; 1930 1940 1950; 1960 1970 1980; 1990 2000 2010

Mentone first appeared as a census designated place in the 1990 U.S. census.

=== 2020 census ===
As of the 2020 census, Mentone had a population of 9,557 and a population density of 1,563.9 inhabitants per square mile (603.8/km^{2}).

The age distribution was 23.7% under the age of 18, 9.4% aged 18 to 24, 28.6% aged 25 to 44, 25.2% aged 45 to 64, and 13.1% who were 65 years of age or older. The median age was 36.7 years. For every 100 females, there were 95.7 males, and for every 100 females age 18 and over there were 93.1 males.

The census reported that 99.4% of the population lived in households, 0.2% lived in non-institutionalized group quarters, and 0.4% were institutionalized. 92.2% of residents lived in urban areas, while 7.8% lived in rural areas.

There were 3,344 households, of which 34.2% had children under the age of 18 living in them. Of all households, 45.4% were married-couple households, 6.8% were cohabiting couple households, 19.6% had a male householder with no spouse or partner present, and 28.1% had a female householder with no spouse or partner present. About 24.3% of all households were made up of individuals, and 8.4% had someone living alone who was 65 years of age or older. The average household size was 2.84, and there were 2,343 families (70.1% of all households).

There were 3,500 housing units at an average density of 572.7 units per square mile (221.1 units/km^{2}), of which 3,344 (95.5%) were occupied and 4.5% were vacant. Of occupied units, 59.0% were owner-occupied and 41.0% were occupied by renters. The homeowner vacancy rate was 1.3% and the rental vacancy rate was 3.6%.

Racial composition as of the 2020 census
Race	Number	Percent
White	4,923	51.5%
Black or African American	448	4.7%
American Indian and Alaska Native	122	1.3%
Asian	518	5.4%
Native Hawaiian and Other Pacific Islander	41	0.4%
Some other race	1,510	15.8%
Two or more races	1,995	20.9%
Hispanic or Latino (of any race)	3,983	41.7%

=== Demographic estimates ===
In 2023, the US Census Bureau estimated that 10.6% of the population were foreign-born. Of all people aged 5 or older, 80.0% spoke only English at home, 13.8% spoke Spanish, 2.8% spoke other Indo-European languages, 3.0% spoke Asian or Pacific Islander languages, and 0.3% spoke other languages. Of those aged 25 or older, 87.1% were high school graduates and 22.8% had a bachelor's degree.

=== Income and poverty ===
The median household income in 2023 was $70,466, and the per capita income was $37,463. About 4.6% of families and 11.4% of the population were below the poverty line.

=== 2010 census ===
At the 2010 census Mentone had a population of 8,720. The population density was 1,398.8 inhabitants per square mile (540.1/km^{2}). The racial makeup of Mentone was 6,114 (70.1%) White (52.4% non-Hispanic White), 438 (5.0%) African American, 122 (1.4%) Native American, 352 (4.0%) Asian, 32 (0.4%) Pacific Islander, 1,234 (14.2%) from other races, and 428 (4.9%) from two or more races. Hispanic or Latino people of any race were 3,085 persons (35.4%).

The census reported that 8,601 people (98.6% of the population) lived in households, 64 (0.7%) lived in non-institutionalized group quarters, and 55 (0.6%) were institutionalized.

There were 3,026 households, 1,239 (40.9%) had children under the age of 18 living in them, 1,442 (47.7%) were opposite-sex married couples living together, 513 (17.0%) had a female householder with no husband present, 204 (6.7%) had a male householder with no wife present. There were 222 (7.3%) unmarried opposite-sex partnerships, and 24 (0.8%) same-sex married couples or partnerships. 674 households (22.3%) were one person and 180 (5.9%) had someone living alone who was 65 or older. The average household size was 2.84. There were 2,159 families (71.3% of households); the average family size was 3.31.

The age distribution was 2,333 people (26.8%) under the age of 18, 979 people (11.2%) aged 18 to 24, 2,344 people (26.9%) aged 25 to 44, 2,263 people (26.0%) aged 45 to 64, and 801 people (9.2%) who were 65 or older. The median age was 33.7 years. For every 100 females, there were 97.3 males. For every 100 females age 18 and over, there were 95.4 males.

There were 3,273 housing units at an average density of 525.0 per square mile, of the occupied units 1,844 (60.9%) were owner-occupied and 1,182 (39.1%) were rented. The homeowner vacancy rate was 2.7%; the rental vacancy rate was 8.3%. 5,371 people (61.6% of the population) lived in owner-occupied housing units and 3,230 people (37.0%) lived in rental housing units.

During 2009–2013, Mentone had a median household income of $58,178, with 10.8% of the population living below the federal poverty line.

== Government ==
=== Local ===
Mentone is not incorporated and has no mayor or city council. Its schools are part of the Redlands Unified School District. Police and fire services are provided by San Bernardino County (police services come from the Yucaipa Valley Station, with mutual aid assistance from the Redlands Police and Fire Departments). Property taxes are collected by San Bernardino County.

=== State and federal representation ===
In the California State Senate, Mentone is in the 19th senatorial district, represented by Republican Rosilicie Ochoa Bogh. In the California State Assembly, it is split between the 45th Assembly district, represented by Democrat James Ramos, and the 47th Assembly district, represented by Republican Greg Wallis.

In the United States House of Representatives, Mentone is split between two congressional districts: California's 33rd congressional district, represented by Democrat Pete Aguilar, and California's 23rd congressional district, represented by Republican Jay Obernolte.

== Education ==
It is in the Redlands Unified School District. Redlands East Valley High School is located in Mentone.
