= California Historical Landmarks in San Bernardino County =

List table of the properties and districts — listed on the California Historical Landmarks — within San Bernardino County, Southern California.

- Note: Click the "Map of all coordinates" link to the right to view a Google map of all properties and districts with latitude and longitude coordinates in the table below.

== Listings ==
Image		Landmark name	Location	City or town	Summary
Agua Mansa Cemetery	121	Agua Mansa Cemetery	Agua Mansa Cemetery, 270 E Agua Mansa Rd. 34°02′31″N 117°21′47″W	Colton	
A.K. Smiley Public Library	994	A.K. Smiley Public Library	125 West Vine St. 34°03′16″N 117°11′03″W	Redlands	Also on the NRHP list as NPS-76000513
Arrowhead	977	Arrowhead	Wildwood Park; 34°10′07″N 117°16′42″W	San Bernardino	
Calico	782	Calico	Ghost Town Road; 34°56′56″N 116°51′51″W	Yermo	
Camp Cady	963	Camp Cady	24 mi N. of Barstow (take Harvard Rd. offramp from I-15, turn right, go .8 mi. to Cherokee Rd., turn left and go 2.5 mi. and turn right at 2nd fence line. At the end of a dirt road.); 34°56′42″N 116°35′57″W	Newberry Springs	
Camp Clipper	985	Camp Clipper	Desert Training Center; 34°48′29″N 115°13′11″W	Fenner	
Camp Ibis	985	Camp Ibis	Desert Training Center; 34°58′10″N 114°49′58″W	Needles	
Camp Iron Mountain	985	Camp Iron Mountain	Desert Training Center; 34°04′55″N 115°07′47″W	Vidal	
Chimney Rock	737	Chimney Rock	On State Hwy 18 and Rabbit Springs Rd. 34°27′00″N 117°00′14″W	Lucerne Valley	
Rancho Cucamonga	490	Rancho Cucamonga	Cucamonga Winery; 8916 Foothill Blvd. 34°06′24″N 117°36′39″W	Rancho Cucamonga	
Daley Toll Road Monument	579	Daley Toll Road Monument	On State Hwy 18 at Daley Canyon Rd; 34°13′50″N 117°12′57″W	Rimforest	
Fort Benson	617	Fort Benson	10600 Hunts Ln. 34°03′41″N 117°17′16″W	Colton	
Harvey House	892	Harvey House	685 North 1st Ave. 34°54′17″N 117°01′29″W	Barstow	Also on the NRHP list as NPS-75000458
Harry Wade Exit Route	622	Harry Wade Exit Route	State Hwy 127; 35°37′59″N 116°17′27″W	Baker	
Holcomb Valley	619	Holcomb Valley	Big Bear Valley Historical Society Museum; 34°18′05″N 116°53′09″W	Big Bear City	
Hulaville Forest, Folk Art	939	Hulaville Forest, Folk Art	Amargosa Rd, 2.0 mi W of I-15 and Phelan Rd. 34°55′31″N 116°53′12″W	Hesperia	
Kimberly Crest	1019	Kimberly Crest	1325 Prospect Dr; 34°02′16″N 117°10′21″W	Redlands	
Madonna of the Trail	1028	Madonna of the Trail	1100 Block of North Euclid Ave. 34°06′26″N 117°39′04″W	Upland	
Garcés-Smith Monument	618	Garcés-Smith Monument	San Bernardino National Forest; 34°14′44″N 117°21′12″W	Colton	
Guachama Rancheria	95	Guachama Rancheria	25894 Mission Rd. 34°03′23″N 117°14′17″W	Redlands	
Mojave Road	963	Mojave Road	Midway Rest Area, N-bound I-15; 33°47′05″N 118°15′29″W	Barstow	
Mill Creek Zanja	43	Mill Creek Zanja	Sylvan Park; 34°03′37″N 117°10′04″W	Redlands	Also on the NRHP list as NPS-77000329
Mormon Lumber Road	96	Mormon Lumber Road	Waterman Canyon	Crestline	
Mormon Stockade	44	Mormon Stockade	San Bernardino County Courthouse; 34°06′20″N 117°17′22″W	San Bernardino	
Mormon Trail Monument	577	Mormon Trail Monument	W Cajon Canyon, State Hwy 138; 34°21′05″N 117°31′37″W	San Bernardino	
National Old Trail Monument	781	National Old Trail Monument	On shoulder of NW corner of Colorado River Bridge, North K St. 34°51′04″N 114°36′35″W	Needles	
Old Bear Valley Dam	725	Old Bear Valley Dam	Big Bear Lake; 34°14′31″N 116°58′34″W	Big Bear Lake	
Possum Trot Folk art	939	Possum Trot; Folk art	Ghost Town Rd, 1.5 mi N of I-15; 34°55′31″N 116°53′12″W	Yermo	
Rancho Santa Ana del Chino	942	Rancho Santa Ana del Chino	Chino Fire Station No. 2, 4440 Eucalyptus Ave. 33°59′24″N 117°43′03″W	Chino	
San Bernardino de Sena Estancia	42	San Bernardino de Sena Estancia	26930 Barton Rd. 34°02′40″N 117°13′15″W	Redlands	
Santa Fe And Salt Lake Trail Monument	576	Santa Fe And Salt Lake Trail Monument	Cajon Pass S end Wagon Train Rd, SE corner I-15 and State Hwy 138; 34°18′22″N 117°28′00″W	San Bernardino	
Searles Lake Borax discovery	774	Searles Lake Borax discovery	Trona Rd at Center St; 35°45′28″N 117°22′38″W	San Bernardino	
Stoddard-Waite Monument	578	Stoddard-Waite Monument	Elsie Arey May Nature Center; 34°18′13″N 117°28′00″W	San Bernardino	
Sycamore Grove	573	Sycamore Grove	Glen Helen Regional Park; 34°12′38″N 117°24′23″W	Devore	
Tapia Adobe	360	Tapia Adobe	Rancho Cucamonga - 8916 Foothill Blvd. 34°06′24″N 117°36′39″W	Rancho Cucamonga	
U.S. Rabbit Experimental Station	950	U.S. Rabbit Experimental Station	Josephine Knoph Senior Citizen Center of Fontana, 8384 Cypress Ave; 34°06′06″N 117°26′40″W	Fontana	
Von Schmidt State Boundary Monument	859	Von Schmidt State Boundary Monument	E side of Pew Rd (River Rd), 2.6 mi S of state line 35°00′51″N 114°39′43″W	Needles	
Yorba-Slaughter Adobe	191	Yorba-Slaughter Adobe	17127 Pomona-Rincon Rd. 33°56′25″N 117°39′57″W	Chino	Also on the NRHP list as NPS-75000460
Yucaipa Adobe	528	Yucaipa Adobe	32183 Kentucky St. 34°02′31″N 117°21′47″W	Yucaipa	
Yucaipa Rancheria	620	Yucaipa Rancheria	32183 Kentucky St. 34°01′21″N 117°06′08″W	Yucaipa	

== See also ==
- List of California Historical Landmarks
- National Register of Historic Places listings in San Bernardino County, California
