= Fort Benson =

Site of an 1850s land dispute

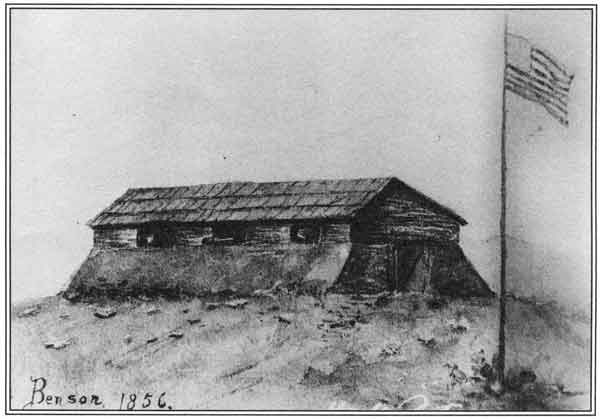
- An artistic rendering of Fort Benson

- Location within California
- 34°03′41″N 117°17′16″W
- Location: 2194 East Oliver Holmes Road, Colton, California

History
- Built: 1857

California Historical Landmark
- Designated: September 11, 1957
- Reference no.: 617

Fort Benson was a fortified homestead created in 1857 in present-day Colton in San Bernardino County, California. The fortification came about during a land dispute between Mormon settlers, who had recently purchased the Rancho San Bernardino land grant, and squatters living on the ranch lands.

Squatter Jerome Benson refused to give up the land he had improved to the Mormons and, with the help of supporters, fortified his home to prevent it being taken; this fortification became known as "Fort Benson." Later that year, as a result of the Utah War, the Mormons were recalled to Utah from San Bernardino, effectively ending the land dispute. While nothing remains of the fort, the site was marked in 1935 and since 1957 has been registered as a California Historical Landmark.

== Exploration and settlements in the area ==
At the arrival of the Spanish, the area was home to the Serrano and Tongva. The land where Fort Benson would be built in the 1850s was the location of the Tongva Jumuba Ranchería during the era of Spanish and Mexican control of California. A second ranchería, called Guachama Ranchería, was located nearby and would become the site of a mission chapel and supply station built by the Mission San Gabriel. (Note: Some historians have believed the location of the chapel and ranchería to be at Politana, while others place it elsewhere.) The chapel was abandoned in 1812, but several years later the mission reestablished a presence in the area with the founding of San Bernardino de Sena Estancia.

Jedediah Smith camped at Jumuba Ranchería in 1827 while being outfitted by the mission.

The Mexican Secularization Act of 1833 and 1834 Decree of Confiscation ended the mission era in California, with the former mission lands being sold or given away by Mexican authorities; the grant lands becoming the Ranchos of California. During this process, a large part of the San Bernardino Valley became part of Rancho San Bernardino, which was granted to the Luga and Sepúlveda families by Governor Juan B. Alvarado. (Note: While the land in Rancho San Bernardino was given gratis, payment was required for the buildings.)

=== Arrival of the Mormons ===
During the Mexican–American War, a company from the Mormon Battalion was assigned to guard the nearby Cajon Pass. The battalion was made up of members of the Church of Jesus Christ of Latter-day Saints (LDS Church), who are commonly referred to as Mormons. In 1848, after being discharged, some of the battalion members made their way to Salt Lake City via the Cajon Pass and helped establish what would become known as the Mormon Road, connecting Salt Lake City with southern California via Las Vegas.

In 1851, Brigham Young, leader of the LDS Church, authorized the creation of a colony in southern California. Amasa Lyman and Charles C. Rich were commissioned by Young to lead the initial group of families to establish the settlement. After arriving in the valley, the Mormon settlers temporarily camped at Sycamore Grove while their leaders negotiated for the purchase of land. Initially, they hoped to purchase the Rancho Santa Ana del Chino from Isaac Williams, however that never came to fruition. Instead, Lyman and Rich successfully negotiated the purchase of Rancho San Bernardino from the Lugo family, with the purchase agreement being finalized in September 1851.

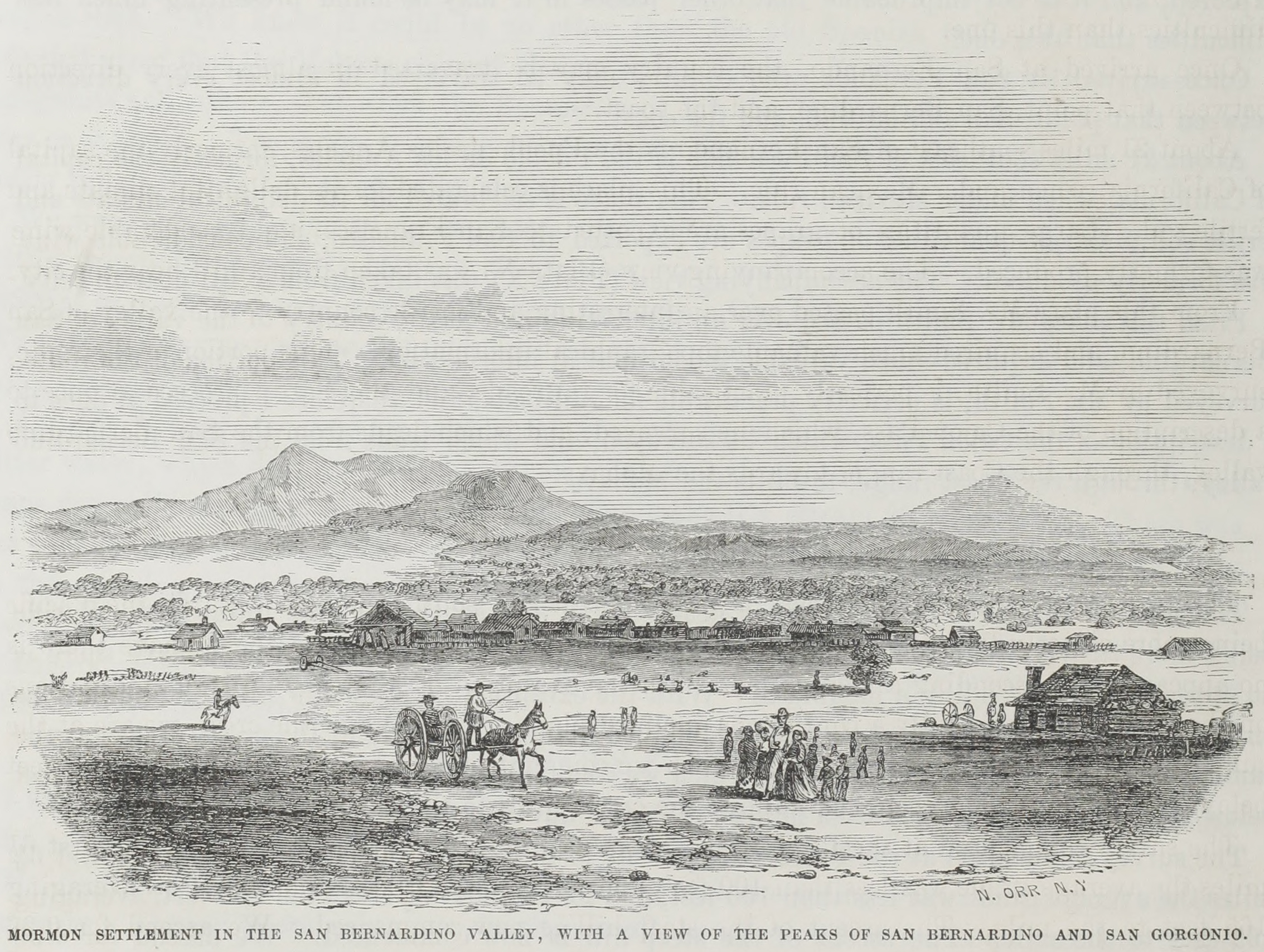
San Bernardino Colony in November 1853

As the settlers began to move onto the newly purchased ranch land, word came that the Natives were organizing to drive settlers out of southern California, so the decision was made to build a large protective stockade, known as Fort San Bernardino. As the threat soon subsided, the townsite of San Bernardino was surveyed and the city laid out in a grid pattern (like Salt Lake City and other Mormon towns) and plots were sold to settlers by Lyman and Rich. The City of San Bernardino was incorporated on April 13, 1854, with Lyman as its first mayor.

== Land dispute ==
In 1854, Jerome Benson arrived in the San Bernardino area. Benson, a former Mormon who had become disaffected with church leaders in the Utah Territory after the death of his wife in a flood on the Provo River, attempted to purchase land within the ranch. The Mormon leaders of the new community, who believed Benson to have an "aggressive disposition," would only sell him property at a significantly higher rate than normal. Rather than pay the exorbitant amount, Benson settled on lands south of the Santa Ana River, thought by him to be outside the land grant.

After purchasing the Rancho San Bernardino land grant, Lyman and Rich discovered it only contained half the amount of land the previous owners had utilized. They appealed to the federal government to be granted the claim at the size they had mistakenly understood it as, but were denied. However, the government did allow them to select their property from any of land they had initially assumed was within the boundaries of the grant. It took several years for the Mormons to determine which lands they would claim, and in the intervening years a number of non-Mormon and former Mormons (who had grown disenchanted with the church) settled in the area, including on land which would ultimately be claimed by the church community. These non-Mormon and former-Mormon settlers in early San Bernardino history have been referred to as "Independents," based on the name of the political party they established in opposition to the church-supported party.

Eventually, Benson's land ended up being claimed by the Mormon settlers, and since he refused to pay for or give up possession of it, he was sued in March 1857. Benson lost in court and an eviction was ordered. However, Benson chose to resist and gathered two dozen supporters who helped him fortify his home, including stealing a cannon from the community and placing it on the fort’s northern wall.

The Mormons chose to largely ignore Benson's actions and refused to inflame the situation, with leaders calling on members not to become aggressors. There may have been one attempt by the sheriff to evict, however his party was met with a blast from the cannon, which had been loaded with rocks. For the remainder of 1857, the fort became a sort of headquarters for the anti-Mormons and squatters in the area.

=== Mormons recalled ===
Soon after the 1857 inauguration of President James Buchanan, he moved to replace Young as governor of the Utah Territory. Convinced by federal territorial officials in Utah that the Mormons would not allow that to happen, Buchanan ordered a 2,500-man military force to the territory, in what would become known as the Utah War. Within the territory, martial law was declared and Mormon men were called upon to defend their communities against what the Mormons saw as religious persecution.

In late October 1857, word from Young reached the 3,000 Mormons in San Bernardino that they should abandon the community and return to Utah due to the war. In the weeks that followed, many of the settlers sold their properties at a loss. Many non-Mormons with the necessary funds did very well financially in the aftermath, acquiring low-cost property and serving as brokers for outside investors. Most of the ranch's remaining unoccupied 25,000 acres (10,000 ha) were sold to a group of California businessmen for $18,000 (equivalent to $621,964 in 2025).

Ultimately, the site of Fort Benson was included in the finalized boundaries of Rancho San Bernardino. A later settlement between Benson and Lyman resulted in Benson receiving compensation for his improvements on the land. Lyman also had sued for damages and costs and won the case, but Benson appealed and the judgement was set aside by a higher court based on irregularities in the lower court. The fort was dismantled and abandoned as a fortification and Benson was able to procure other lands for himself (at a much lower cost, given the hasty recall of the Mormon settlers from the area).

On December 27, 1858, the US Army arrived in San Bernardino as part of the Mohave Expedition. Under the leadership of Colonel William Hoffman, troops were placed in San Bernardino and Cajon Pass to deal with Natives and any land disputes. They did not occupy Fort Benson, instead establishing Camp Banning (later Camp Prentiss). There is no record of Fort Benson being used by the US military or housing troops.

== Markers ==
Fort Benson was registered as a California Historic Landmark (No. 617) on September 11, 1957.

In February 1935, the Native Daughters of the Golden West and Native Sons of the Golden West dedicated a marker at the site of Fort Benson. Present at the ceremony was Judge Henry M. Willis of Los Angeles, a grandson of Jerome Benson. As part of the dedication, local historian George W. Beattie provided an address on the history of the site, including the village of Jumuba and the fort.

The marker—located at 601 South Hunts Lane, Colton, California—reads:

Fort Benson
On this spot fort was erected, 1856, during contest over valley lands. Here stood ancient Indian village, Jumuba, headquarters first mission stock farm in valley. Here, 1821, occurred first Christian baptism credited to San Bernardino. Here, 1827, camped Jedediah Strong Smith, first American to enter California overland.
Placed by
Lugonia Parlor No, 241, N.D.G.W
Arrowhead Parlor No. 110, N.S.G.W.
1935

In the 1950s, the site of the former fort underwent a dramatic transformation during the construction of the San Bernardino Freeway (Interstate 10) just to the north. Remains of an historic well, a pond, tree grove, and an 1880s brick home at the site were bulldozed, with the House Grain Company building on the property. The monument was moved slightly in the 2010s, during the construction of the Hunt's Lane Overpass.

North of the fort's former site, at the San Bernardino County Court House, the Native Daughters of the Golden West added a monument in 1951 commemorating Jedediah Smith passing through the area. This marker reads:

To Jedediah Smith
Pathfinder of the Southern Sierras
Born at Brambridge in Northern N.Y. January 6, 1799 he discovered south pass of the Rocky Mts. the great gateway through which passed nearly all subsequent migration west and northwest from the Atlantic to the Pacific.
He was the first American to enter California by the overland route through Cajon Pass in November 1826. Jedediah Smith stands peerless among the pathfinders of California's epic past.
This plaque dedicated to his memory April 1, 1951 by Lugonia Parlor 241 Native Daughters of Golden West.

== See also ==
- California Historical Landmarks in San Bernardino County, California
- History of San Bernardino, California

== Bibliography ==
- Beattie, George William; Beattie, Helen Pruitt (1951). Heritage of the Valley: San Bernardino's First Century. Oakland, California: Biobooks.
- Brown, Jr., John; Boyd, James, eds. (1922). History of San Bernardino and Riverside Counties. Vol. 1. The Western Historical Association.
- Lyman, Edward Leo (Winter 1983). "The Demise of The San Bernardino Mormon Community, 1851-1857". Southern California Quarterly. 65 (4). Historical Society of Southern California & University of California Press: 321–339. doi:10.2307/41171063.
- Lyman, Edward Leo (1996). San Bernardino: The Rise and Fall of a California Community. Salt Lake City: Signature Books. ISBN 1-56085-067-1.
- Schuiling, Walter C. (1984). San Bernardino County: Land of Contrasts. Woodland Hills, California: San Bernardino County Museum Association & Windsor Publications. ISBN 0-89781-116-X.
