= Daley Toll Road =

California Historic Landmark

Daley Toll Road Monument
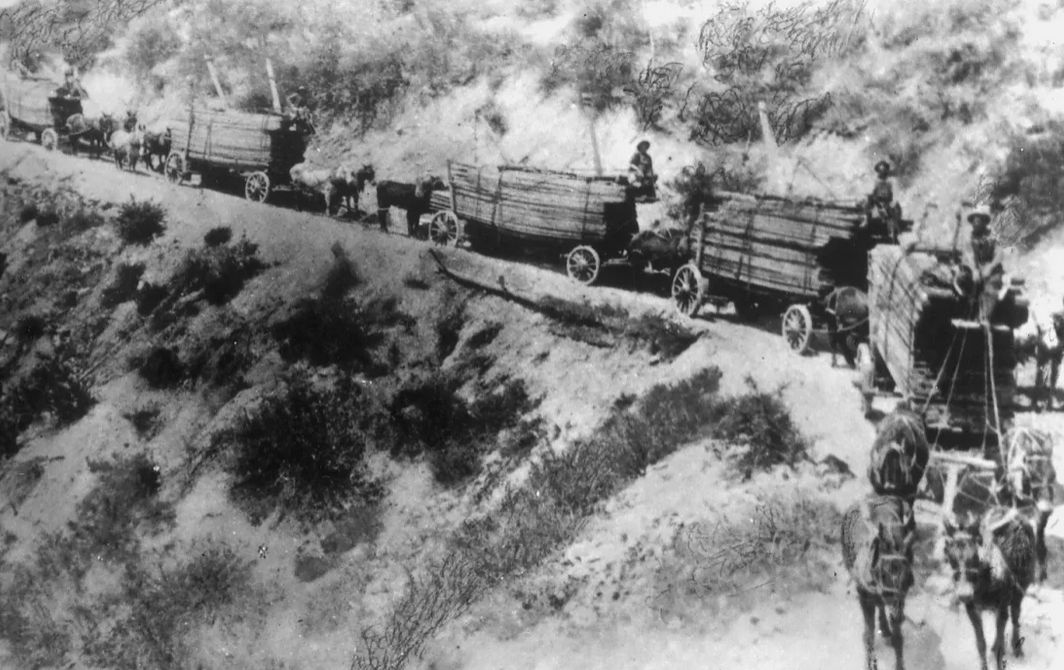
- Daley Canyon Road, opened in 1870 in the San Bernardino Mountains

- Location within California
- 34°13′50″N 117°12′57″W
- Location: Rimforest, California

History
- Built: 1870

Site notes
- Architect: Edward Daley

California Historical Landmark
- Designated: May 17, 1957
- Reference no.: 579

Map with Del Rosa the start of the toll road and Lake Arrowhead the end of the toll road, red line is highway 18, not the toll road

The Daley Toll Road Monument was designated a California Historic Landmark (No.579) on May 17, 1957. Daley Toll Road Monument marker is in the San Bernardino Mountains. The Monument is on the first wagon road built in San Bernardino Mountains. Engineer Edward Daley Sr. (March 31, 1825 – January 25, 1896) and his sons built and opened the toll road in 1870. The Daley family ran the toll road until 1890. The toll road ran from the city of San Bernardino to Lake Arrowhead. The road was called the Twin and City Creek Turnpike and the turnpike into the mountains. In 1890 the road became a San Bernardino County, California road called the Daley Canyon Road. The road is now a US Forest Service fire road and is closed to the public. The Monument is near the current city of Rimforest, California on California State Route 18 at Daley Canyon Rd, about 0.6 miles East of Rim Forest. The road made good money for Daley family. The road was used by lumber men, cattle men and sheep herders. Edward Daley became a San Bernardino county supervisor from January 5, 1880, to January 8, 1883. He opened a farm ranch called Dell Rosa at the entrance to the toll road. Edward Daley in Council Bluffs, Iowa, married in 1846, Nancy Ann Hunt, daughter of Capt. Jefferson Hunt. Hunt made three trips over the Cajon Pass and Mojave Desert one in 1847, second in 1849 and last in 1851. Each trip he was the leader of wagon trains, bringing pioneer west, down one of the westward Expansion Trails. Edward and Nancy came to California on the 1849 trip, together they had 11 children: Laomi, Celia, Edward Jr., Charles Jefferson, John, Grace, Annetta, Frank, Lou, May and Kate. The road he built went up Strawberry Creek, crossed over to the west fork of City Creek, passed by the east of Strawberry Peak and then dropped into Little Bear Valley. Little Bear Valley is where the towns of Blue Jay and Lake Arrowhead are located. At the end of the toll road John Commerford ran the top end of the toll road. John Commerford ran a store at the location.

== Markers ==
California historical landmarks reads:

The Daley Road, built by Edward Daley and Co. in 1870, was one of the first roads into the San Bernardino Mountains that could accommodate wagons. It was a toll road until 1890, when it became a county road. Now a Forest Service fire road, it is not open to the public.

== See also ==
- Santa Fe And Salt Lake Trail Monument
- Stoddard-Waite Monument
- California Historical Landmarks in San Bernardino County, California
- History of San Bernardino, California
- Timeline of San Bernardino, California history
