= Fort San Bernardino =

1850s frontier fort in San Bernardino, California

- Mormon Stockade
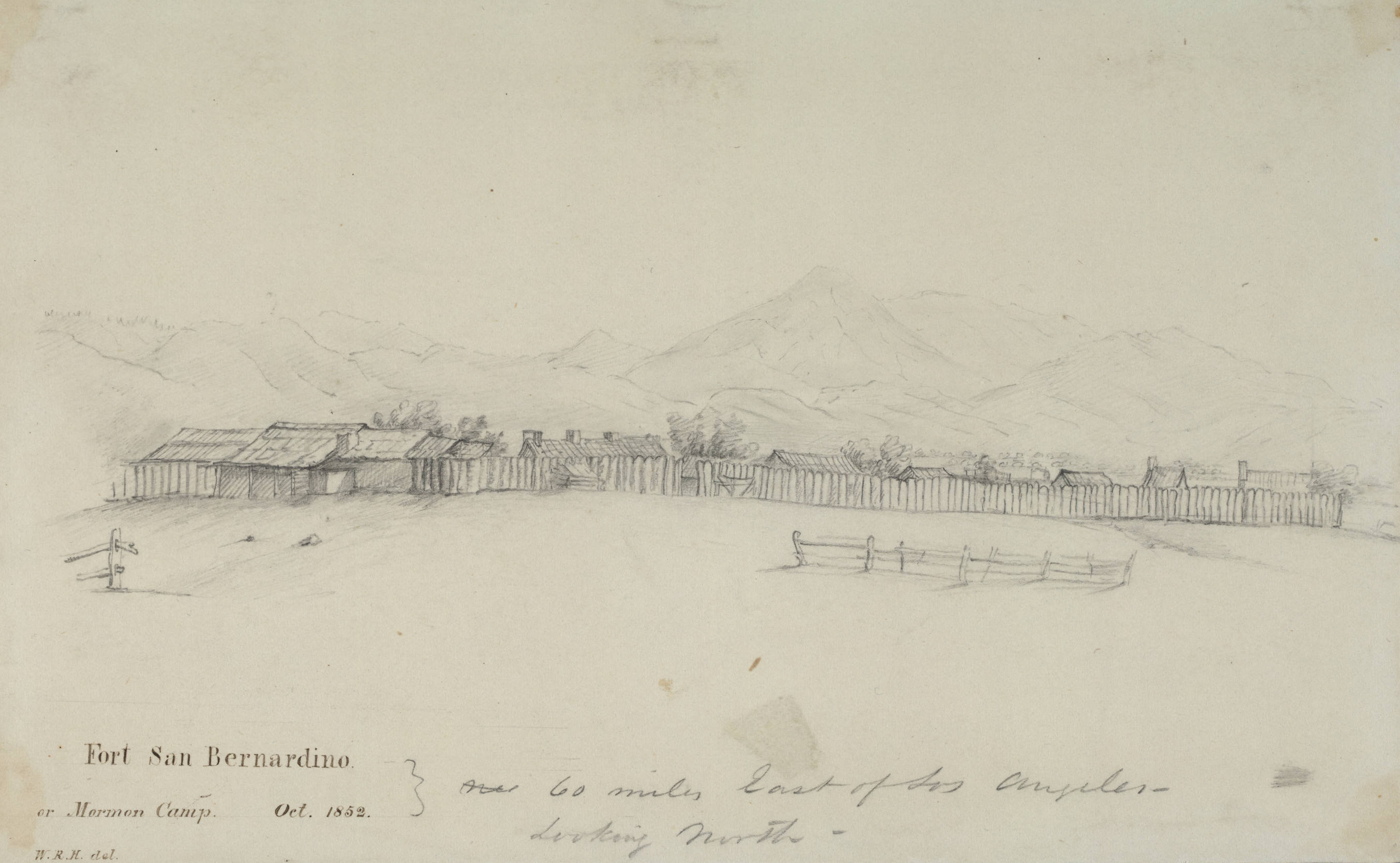
- The fort as seen in an October 1852 drawing by William Rich Hutton

- Location within California
- 34°06′20″N 117°17′22″W
- Location: downtown San Bernardino, California

History
- Built: 1851
- Built by: Amasa Lyman; Charles C. Rich; Mormon pioneers

California Historical Landmark
- Designated: August 1, 1932
- Reference no.: 44

Fort San Bernardino (also known as the Mormon Stockade) was a frontier fortification in present-day San Bernardino, California. The fort was constructed in 1851 by Mormon pioneers following their purchase of the Rancho San Bernardino land grant.

Fearing attacks against settlers by the Indigenous peoples of California, the Mormons constructed the large protective stockade soon after they completed the purchase of the rancho. When the threat of attack subsided, the settlers laid out the townsite of San Bernardino and began to move onto the city lots, abandoning the fort. In 1857, the Utah War resulted in most Mormons leaving the San Bernardino Colony for the Utah Territory.

Today, nothing remains of the fort structure, with the San Bernardino County Court House sitting atop its former location. Several markers on the site memorialize both the fort and the Mormon settlement. The site was listed as a California Historical Landmark (No. 44) in 1932.

== San Bernardino Colony ==
=== Purchase of the rancho ===
Members of the Church of Jesus Christ of Latter-day Saints (LDS Church), who are commonly referred to as Mormons, became familiar with the San Bernardino area in the 1840s. During the Mexican–American War, a company from the Mormon Battalion was assigned to guard Cajon Pass. In 1848, after being discharged, some of the battalion members made their way to Salt Lake City via Cajon Canyon and helped establish what would become known as the Mormon Road, connecting Salt Lake City with Southern California. In 1849, LDS Church leadership sent Amasa Lyman, accompanied by other men, to California to scout out possible settlement sites between Salt Lake City and the Pacific Coast.

Church member Jefferson Hunt, after spending time in California gold mining, returned to Salt Lake City in early 1851 with a letter from Isaac Williams who offered to sell Rancho Santa Ana del Chino to the Saints. Soon after, Brigham Young (president of the LDS Church), set apart Amasa Lyman and Charles C. Rich to establish a Mormon settlement in the area.

437 persons volunteered to settle in the new colony and met at Peteetneet Creek in March 1851 to begin the journey. The travel was grueling, with poor weather and trails, along with attacks from the Natives in Utah, and the group went for a stretch of 50 miles (80 km) without water in the deserts. They arrived in the San Bernardino Valley in June 1851, staying at a place called Sycamore Grove.

After arriving in the valley, Lyman and Rich approached Williams about the purchase of his rancho but learned he had changed his mind and refused to sell. Instead, in September 1851, they purchased the Rancho San Bernardino from the Lugo family for $77,500 (equivalent to $2,999,250 in 2025).

=== Establishment ===
As Lyman and Rich were completing their purchase of land, Chief Antonio Garra was organizing a Native resistance against settlers in Southern California. Fearing attacks, the Saints decided to first construct a fortification, consisting of a stockade, on their newly purchased land. The settlers lived within the fort walls for more than a year; they resided in the fort for such a long time not because threats continued for that long, but because time was spent clearing land and planting crops rather than establishing new homes. The community also came together to build infrastructure, including grain storage facilities, a flour mill, and a lumber road and sawmills.

After settling, Lyman and Rich discovered they had misunderstood the size of the land grant, as it contained less than half the land originally thought and was also without defined boundaries. To resolve the issue, the US federal government allowed the men to pick their allotment of land from within the boundaries as they had initially and erroneously believed them to be. This would eventually lead to land disputes with squatters, including with a former Mormon named Jerome Benson (who would construct Fort Benson in a stand against the Mormon settlers).

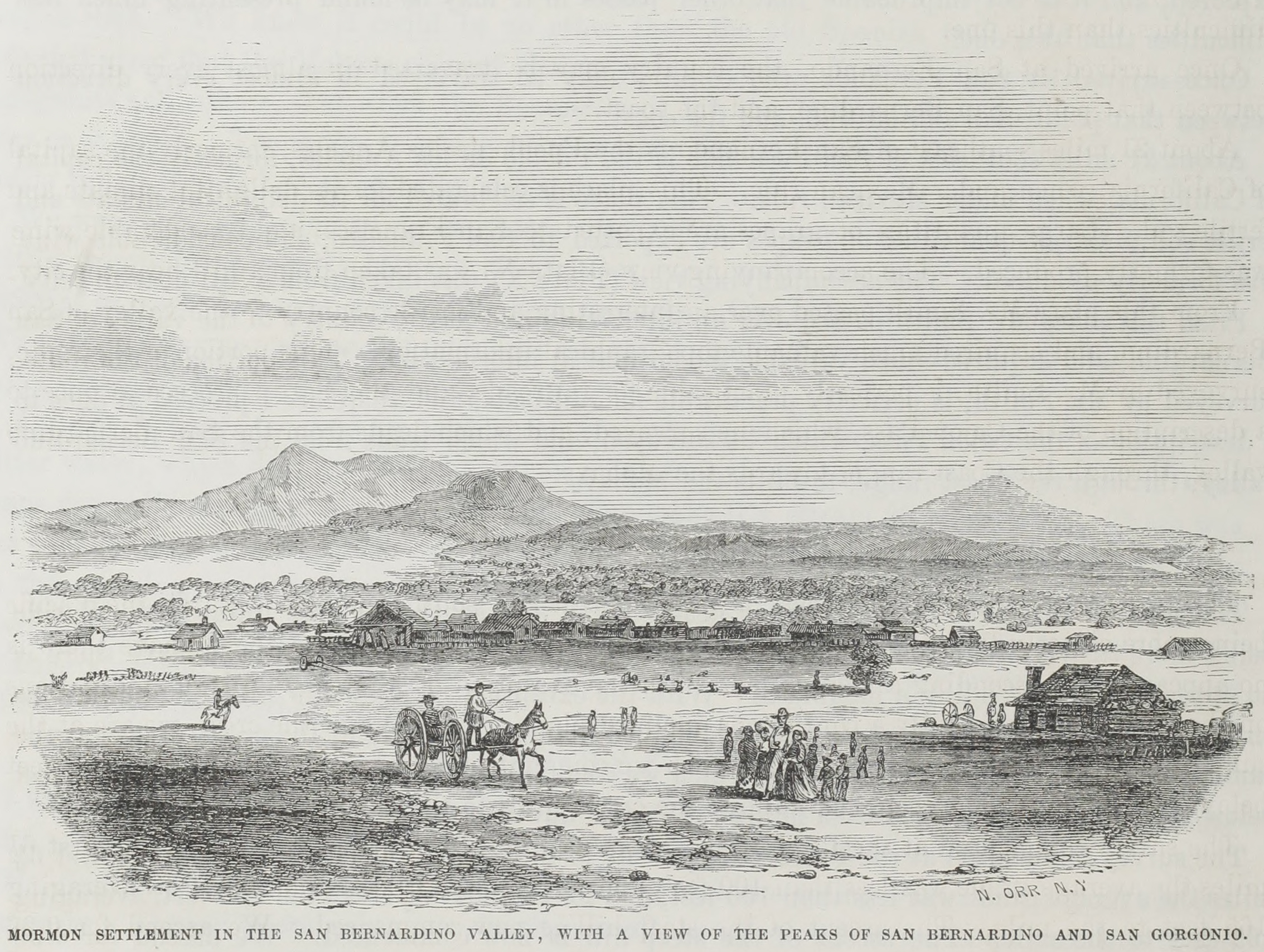
San Bernardino Colony in November 1853

In 1853, the townsite of San Bernardino was surveyed (following the grid pattern common in Mormon settlements). The settlers purchased plots from Lyman and Rich in the townsite and moved from the fort to their properties. The community also constructed a "council house" which would serve as seat of government for both the city and church. On April 13, 1854, the City of San Bernardino was incorporated, and Lyman was elected its first mayor.

=== Mormon recall ===
Soon after the 1857 inauguration of President James Buchanan, he moved to replace Young as governor of the Utah Territory. Convinced by federal officials in Utah Territory that the Mormons would not allow that to happen, Buchanan ordered a 2,500-man military force to the territory, in what would become known as the Utah War. Within the territory, martial law was declared and Mormons were called upon to defend their communities.

In late October 1857, word from Young reached the 3,000 Mormons in San Bernardino that they should abandon the city and return to Utah due to the war. In the weeks that followed, many of the settlers sold their properties at a loss as they left the community. Lyman and Rich sold most of the rancho's remaining unoccupied land to a group of California businessmen for $18,000 (equivalent to $621,964 in 2025).

=== Later use ===
In May 1862, William D. Bradshaw established the Bradshaw Stagecoach Trail and used the fort as a connection point to the Los Angeles Stagecoach lines for travelers heading West.

== Fort description ==
The fort measured approximately 700 by 300 feet (213 by 91 m). The stockade walls were constructed of split cottonwood and willow logs measuring 15 feet (4.6 m) long. The fort's west wall was made up of the backside of log homes, and other houses were constructed within the fort. A ditch carried water from Lytle Creek into a small reservoir in the fort. Also within the fort was a meeting/school house, wagon shop, colony office, and a church tithing/storehouse.

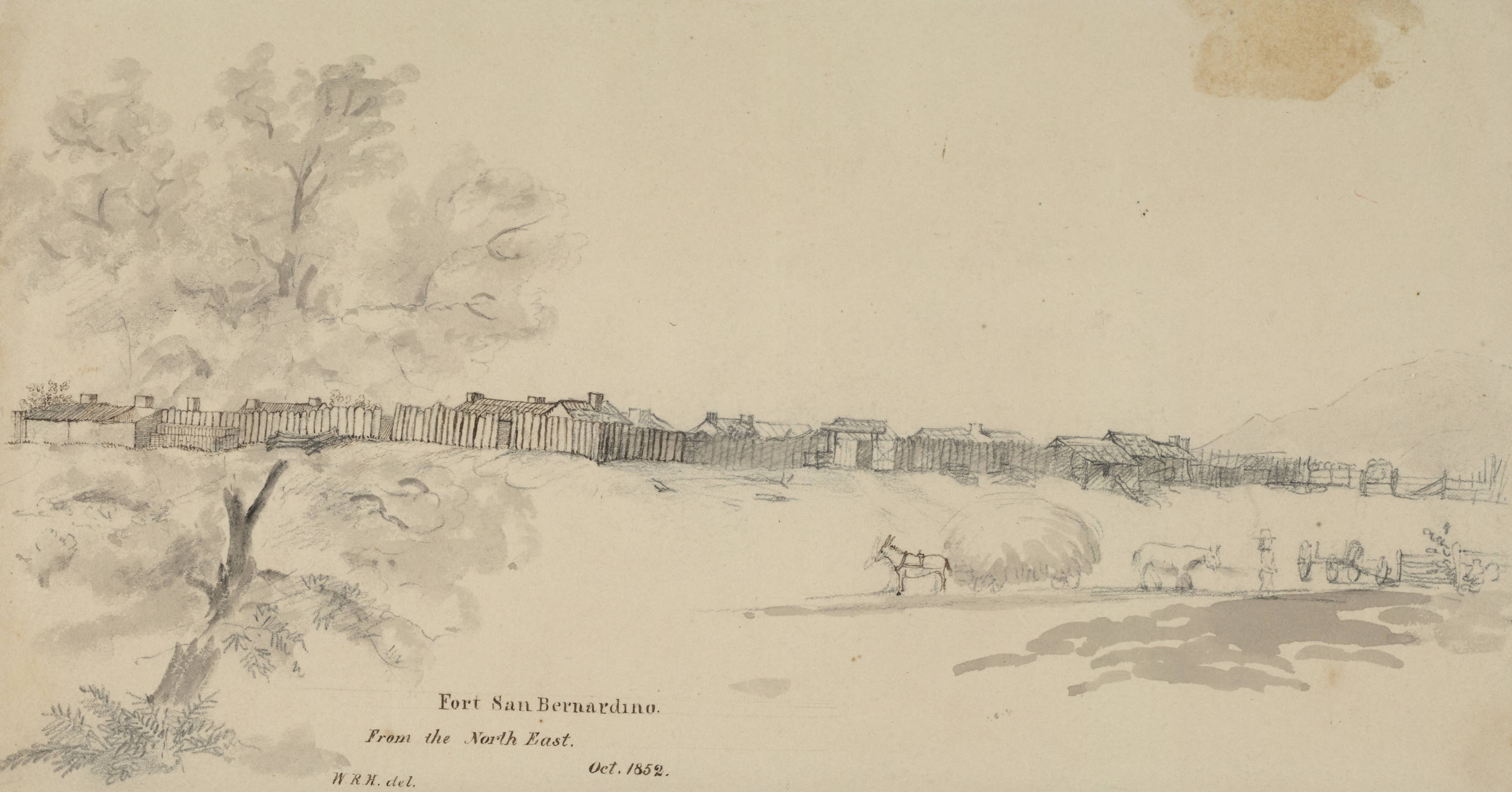
View of the fort from the northeast by William Rich Hutton, dated October 1852

== Memorialization ==
There are no physical remains of the fort. On April 30, 1927, the county dedicated the San Bernardino County Court House on the site of the former fort. At the time, a bronze tablet (attached to the front of the building) telling the history of the fort was also dedicated. The plaque reads:

On this site in 1839 was built the first house in San Bernardino, the home of Jose del Carmen Lugo one of the grantees of the Rancho San Bernardino
—
Also on this site in 1851 a stockade of logs was built as a protection against Indians. In it more than a hundred pioneer families lived for over a year
—
Tablet placed by Arrowhead Parlor Native Sons of the Golden West
1927

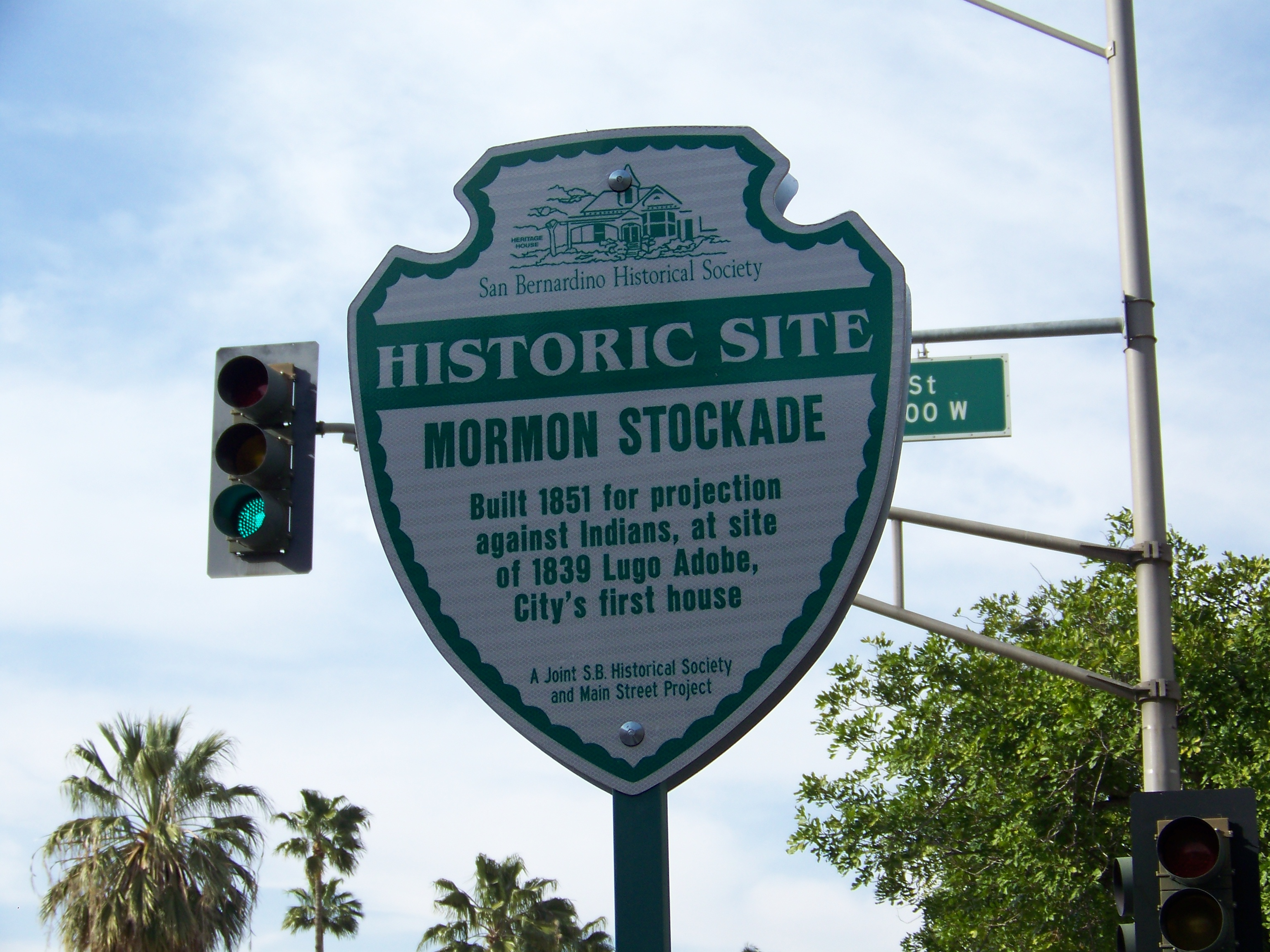
Marker added by the San Bernardino Historical Society

On August 1, 1932, the site was registered as a California Historical Landmark. Additional monuments have been added over the years, including a monument to the memory of Charles C. Rich and Amasa Lyman on the southwest corner of the courthouse grounds in June 1932. A plaque memorializing the council house was added by the Lugonia Parlor of the Native Daughters of the Golden West at the corner of 3rd Street and Arrowhead Avenue (current site of the San Bernardino Justice Center) in May 1955. In January 1965, the Daughters of Utah Pioneers dedicated a large monument, built the previous year in front of the county courthouse. The monument memorialized the settlement of San Bernardino by the Mormons and listed the names of hundreds of Saints who settled there in the 1850s. Several of these markers have since been removed or stolen. The San Bernardino Historical Society added an arrowhead-shaped marker in front of the courthouse, marking the historic site.

== See also ==
- Biddy Mason
- California Historical Landmarks in San Bernardino County, California
- Fort Benson
- Fort Lemhi
- Fort Supply (Utah Territory)
- History of San Bernardino, California
- Old Las Vegas Mormon Fort

== Bibliography ==
- Beattie, George William; Beattie, Helen Pruitt (1951). Heritage of the Valley: San Bernardino's First Century. Oakland, California: Biobooks.
- Cowan, Richard O.; Homer, William E. (1996). California Saints: A 150-Year Legacy in the Golden State. Provo, Utah: Religious Studies Center (BYU). ISBN 1-57008-200-6.
- Lyman, Edward Leo (Winter 1983). "The Demise of The San Bernardino Mormon Community, 1851-1857". Southern California Quarterly. 65 (4). Historical Society of Southern California & University of California Press: 321–339. doi:10.2307/41171063.
- Lyman, Edward Leo (1996). San Bernardino: The Rise and Fall of a California Community. Salt Lake City: Signature Books. ISBN 1-56085-067-1.
- Schuiling, Walter C. (1984). San Bernardino County: Land of Contrasts. Woodland Hills, California: San Bernardino County Museum Association & Windsor Publications. ISBN 0-89781-116-X.
