= Mormon Trail Monument =

California Historic Landmark

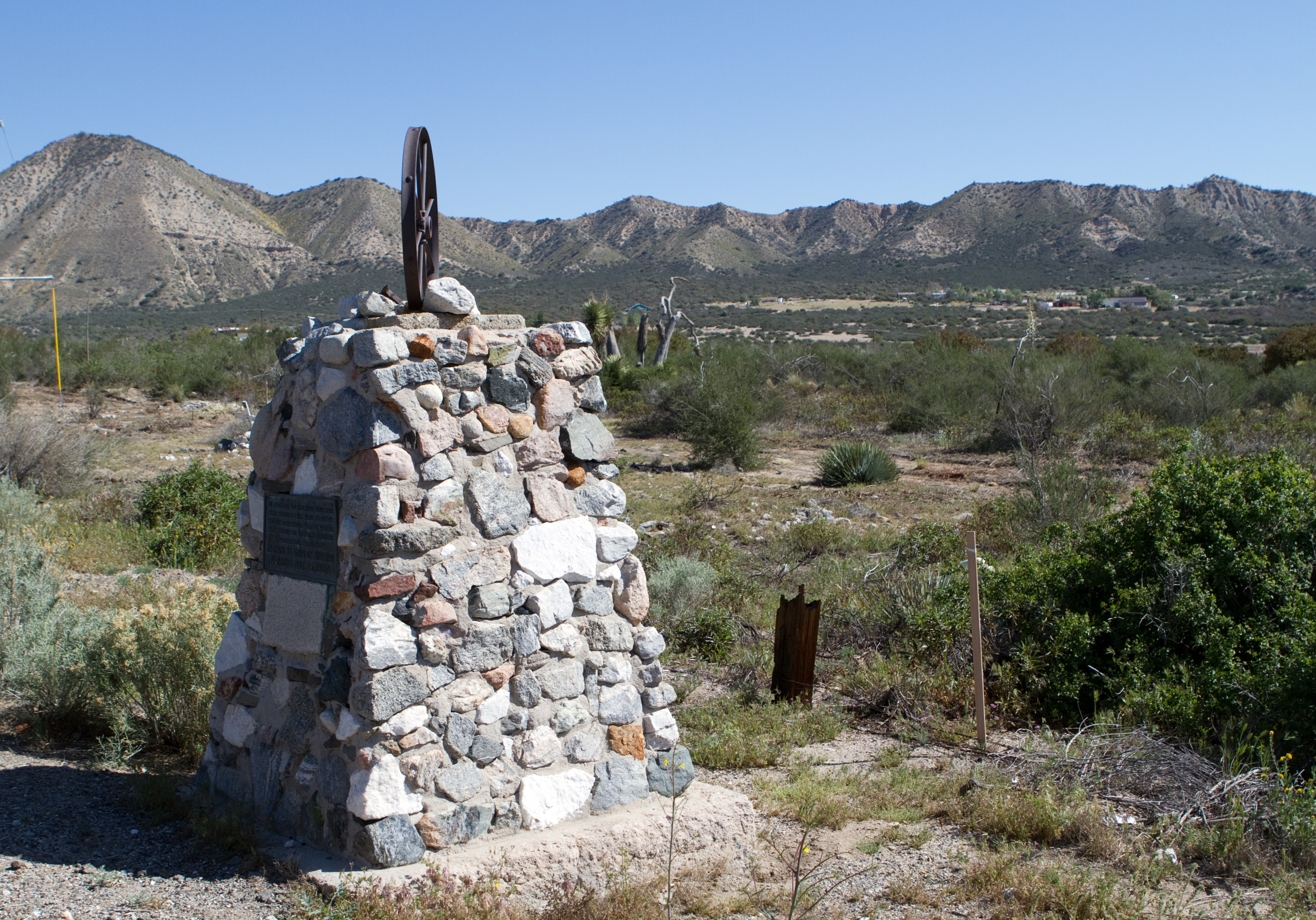
- Mormon Trail Monument

- Location within California
- 34°21′05″N 117°31′37″W
- Location: near Phelan, California

History
- Built: 1937

California Historical Landmark
- Reference no.: 577

The Mormon Trail Monument was designated a California Historic Landmark (No.577). The monument is to remember the 500 Mormon pioneers who came to the San Bernardino Valley in June 1851, establishing Fort San Bernardino. The monument is near Phelan, California in San Bernardino County, California. The Monument was built in 1937 and is on California State Route 138, 3.6 Miles West of Interstate 15. In 1857, about half the Mormons were told to return to Utah during the Utah War. the Mormon War, or the Mormon Rebellion

== See also ==
- California Historical Landmarks in San Bernardino County, California
- Mormon Road from Salt Lake City to Southern California
- Mormon Trail from Illinois to Salt Lake City
- Santa Fe And Salt Lake Trail Monument
- Stoddard-Waite Monument
