= Alexey W. Von Schmidt =

California Historic Landmark

Von Schmidt State Boundary Monument
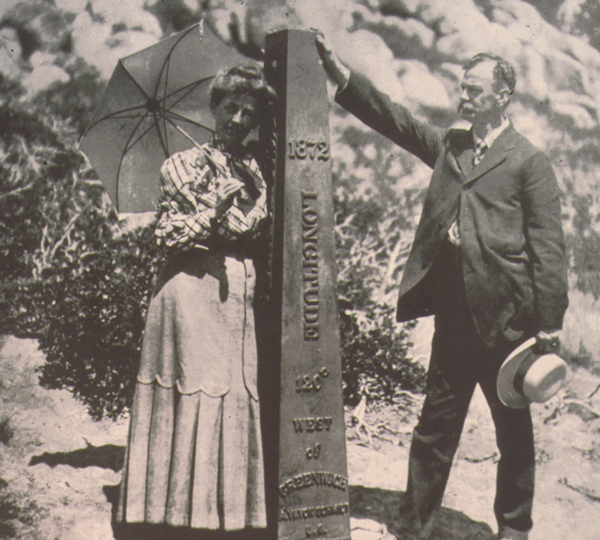
- Von Schmidt with a State Boundary Monument

- Location within California
- 35°00′51″N 114°39′43″W
- Location: near Needles, California

History
- Built: 1873

Site notes
- Architect: Von Schmidt

California Historical Landmark
- Designated: April 26, 1973
- Reference no.: 859

Nevada Historical Marker
- Reference no.: 188

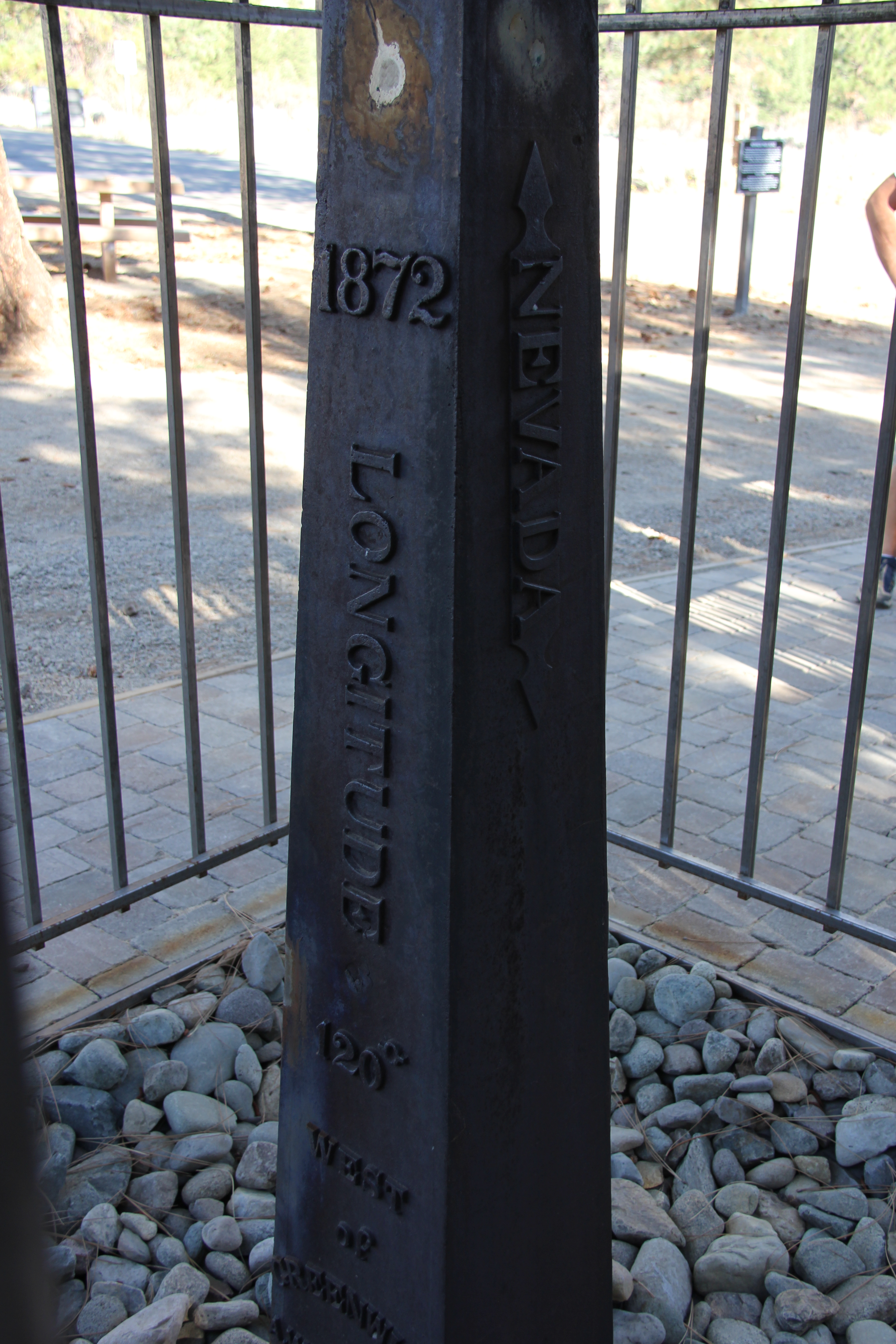
The 1872 Nevada marker

The Von Schmidt State Boundary Monument was designated a California Historic Landmark (No. 859) on April 26, 1973. In 1873 San Francisco civil engineer Allexey W. Von Schmidt built the State Boundary Monument in San Bernardino County, California, near Needles, California. In 1872 and 1873 Von Schmidt did a survey of the border between California and Nevada/Arizona. The California Historic marker is on the dirt road, Pew Road, also called River Road, 2.6 miles (4.2 km) south of the State Line; 14 miles (23 km) north of Needles. The marker is not at the current state boundary, as Von Schmidt made an error in his survey. A new survey in 1893 showed that the Von Schmidt line was 1,600 to 1,800 feet (490 to 550 m) off to the west. The marker is at the southern end of the California-Arizona State boundary. In 1872, a dispute arose between Nevada and California about the location of the state's boundary. Nevada wanted the state divide to be the same as the Sierra Nevada mountain range divide. California wanted the line to the east of the mountain range. When California attained statehood in 1850, it adopted 120 degrees west longitude as its eastern border. Between 1855 and 1900 there were six surveys to locate 120 degrees, with each locating 120 degrees of longitude differently. Von Schmidt applied for and was granted the contract to survey the state's frontier border east of the Sierra Nevada. In 1872 Von Schmidt using only a compass, a sextant and dead reckoning process set out with his crew to define the boundary. Von Schmidt was charged to measure and mark the boundary. Von Schmidt and his crew built stone markers and installed cast iron markers about one mile apart on the length of the state's boundary. Not many of the markers had foundations, so fewer remain today. A new survey in 1893 showed that the Von Schmidt line was 1,600 to 1,800 feet (490 to 550 m) west of the actual 120 degrees. However, California and Nevada both recognize the 1872 Von Schmidt survey and the 1893 survey as the state line. Later the 1893 line was used. The exact location of the north-south California-Nevada border, between Lake Tahoe and the intersection of the southern boundary of Oregon at the 42nd parallel, was contentious and was surveyed and re-surveyed many time.

One of the few iron markers that has survived is a near Verdi, Nevada; this is a National Historic Landmark called the 1872 California-Nevada State Boundary Marker.

== Allexey W. Von Schmidt ==
Allexey W. Von Schmidt (1821–1906) came to California from New York City in 1849, as an American pioneer to prospect in the California Gold Rush. Von Schmidt heard about the gold at Sutter's Fort area of the Central Valley and came looking. Trained as a civil engineer and surveyor, he departed the gold prospecting camps, to return to surveying. In 1853 he surveyed Contra Costa County, California, Rancho San Miguel and a ranch in Yuba County. In 1855 he received a job to survey the land near Mono Lake. The job expanded and he surveyed down to Yosemite. Next he worked for the City of San Francisco. He worked on small and large projects. One of the large projects was to help build San Francisco's first dam and drinking water aqueduct system. Von Schmidt was a key engineer in San Francisco and worked on the San Francisco cable car system. In 1872 he started the survey of the state's border, a task that took two years to complete. Von Schmidt died on May 18, 1906, in San Francisco, having survived the 1906 San Francisco earthquake. Allexey W. Von Schmidt's brother, Alfred von Schmidt, came west also and had a farm in Fresno growing grages.

In July 1976 surveyor Bud Uzes retraced Von Schmidt's 1872–1873 trip along California's border at North Tahoe. This area was part of a lawsuit that went to the Supreme Court of the United States. Bud Uzes wrote a book Chaining the Land about the Houghton-Ives Line made in 1863 and the Von Schmidt line made in 1872 and the disputed California-Nevada boundary.

== Markers ==
Marker at the Needles site reads:

- This boundary monument, a cast iron column erected in 1873, marks the southern terminus of the California-Nevada State boundary established by A. W. Von Schmidt's 1872–73 survey. Von Schmidt's line, the first officially recognized oblique state line between California and Nevada, erred slightly, the boundary was later corrected to the present line, 3/4 mile to the north.

== See also ==
- California Historical Landmarks in San Bernardino County, California
- List of National Historic Landmarks in Nevada
- Constitutional Convention (California)
- Compromise of 1850
- California Constitution
- California and Nevada Border Dispute
- Coast and Geodetic Survey Granite Boundary Monument No. 1 (circa 1894) – South Lake Tahoe
