= Glen Helen Regional Park =

County park in San Bernardino County, California

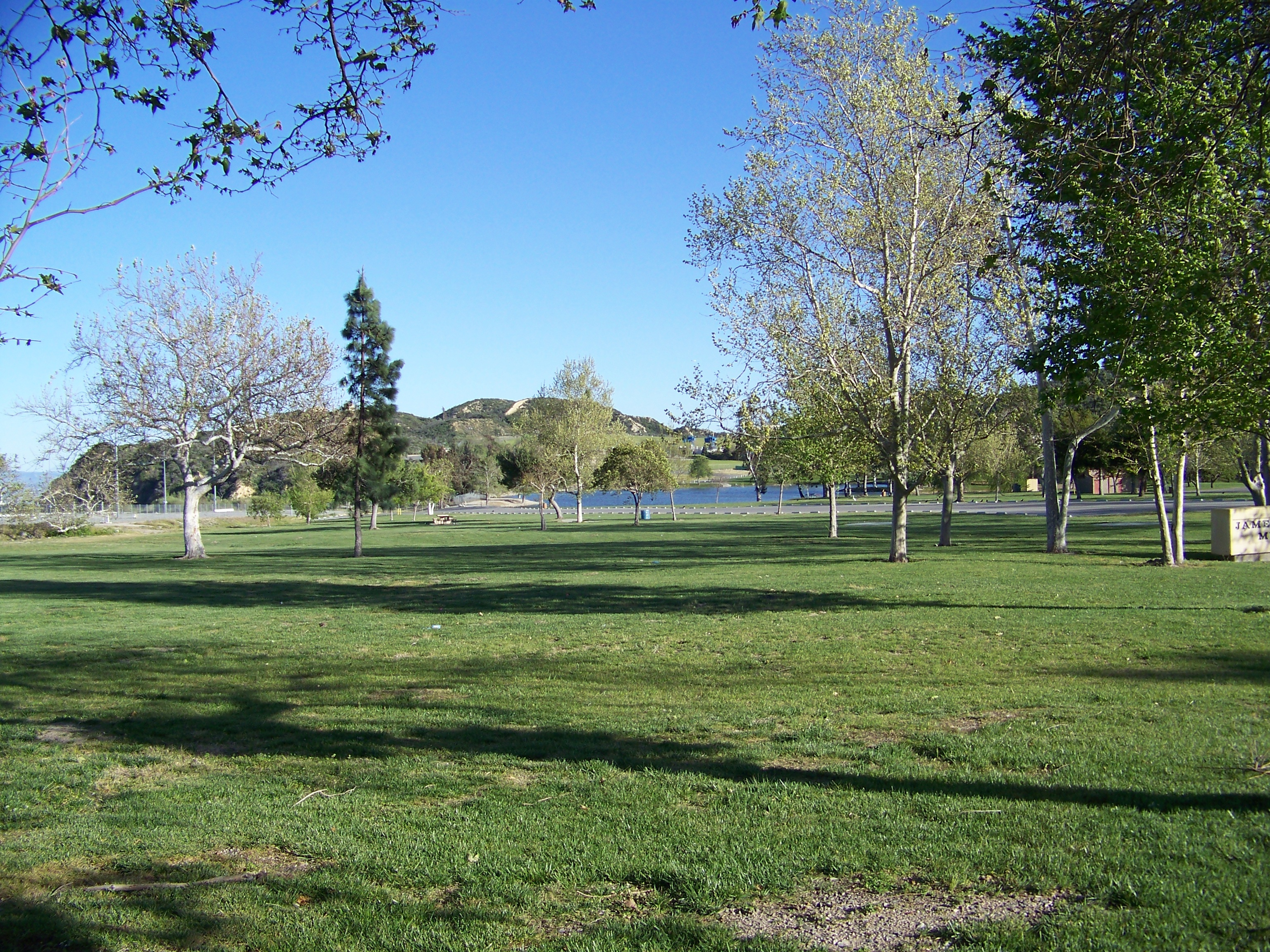
- Interactive map of Glen Helen Regional Park
- Location: Devore, California
- Coordinates: 34°12′22″N 117°24′20″W
- Created: August 4, 1968

Glen Helen Regional Park is a county park located in San Bernardino, California, United States adjacent to the Cajon Pass. It was the site of both US Festivals of the early 1980s. It is also home to the Glen Helen Amphitheater, the largest outdoor amphitheater in the United States. The park also hosts several off-road races since 1985.

== Park history ==
Historically, the property was home to Glen Helen Farm/Ranch. The ranch was purchased by San Bernardino County in July 1948 and was used to grow food and raise beef for use in county institutions, such as the hospital and prison, along with being a site of juvenile and prison rehabilitation camps. In the early 1960s, the agriculture program was terminated by the county, as purchasing food on the open market had become just as feasible. The county then decided to develop a regional park on the site, with a groundbreaking held in December 1966. The first phase of the park opened, without ceremony, on October 1, 1967. The completed park opened on August 4, 1968, with a ceremony attended by over 6,000 persons.

The park opened a swimming complex in May 1988. The Blockbuster Pavilion (now the Glen Helen Amphitheater) opened in the park during July 1993.

== Motorsport ==
Glen Helen has hosted off-road races since 1985. Its motocross track is known for its steep hills, jumps and banking. It hosted a round of the AMA Motocross Championship in 1993, later from 1996 to 2009, and from 2014 to 2018. It is typically held in May, originally on Mother's Day and currently on Memorial Day, except from 2004 to 2007, when it held in mid September as the final round.

Glen Helen has hosted a round of the Motocross World Championship from 1990 to 1992, later from 2010 to 2011, and from 2015 to 2016. It held Lucas Oil Off Road Racing Series races from 2010 to 2020, as well as Nitro Rallycross and Great American Shortcourse since their inaugural seasons in 2021.

From November 30 to December 2, 2018, Glen Helen hosted the Robby Gordon Off-Road World Championships, overseen by Gordon's Stadium Super Trucks series. In addition to SST, motocross and other off-road vehicles participated.

AMA 450cc four-stroke (formerly 250cc two-stroke) Motocross Championship race winners

Year	Rider	Motorcycle
1993	Mike LaRocco	Kawasaki
1996	Jeremy McGrath	Honda
1997	Jeff Emig	Kawasaki
1998	Mickael Pichon	Suzuki
1999	Sebastien Tortelli	Honda
2000	Ricky Carmichael	Kawasaki
2001	Tim Ferry	Yamaha
2002	Ricky Carmichael	Honda
2003	Ricky Carmichael	Honda
2004	Ricky Carmichael	Honda
2005	Ricky Carmichael	Suzuki
2006	James Stewart Jr.	Kawasaki
2007	Grant Langston	Yamaha
2008	James Stewart Jr.	Kawasaki
2009	Ryan Villopoto	Kawasaki
2014	Ryan Dungey	KTM
2015	Eli Tomac	Honda
2016	Ken Roczen	Suzuki
2017	Marvin Musquin	KTM
2018	Eli Tomac	Kawasaki

== Sycamore Grove ==
Sycamore Grove
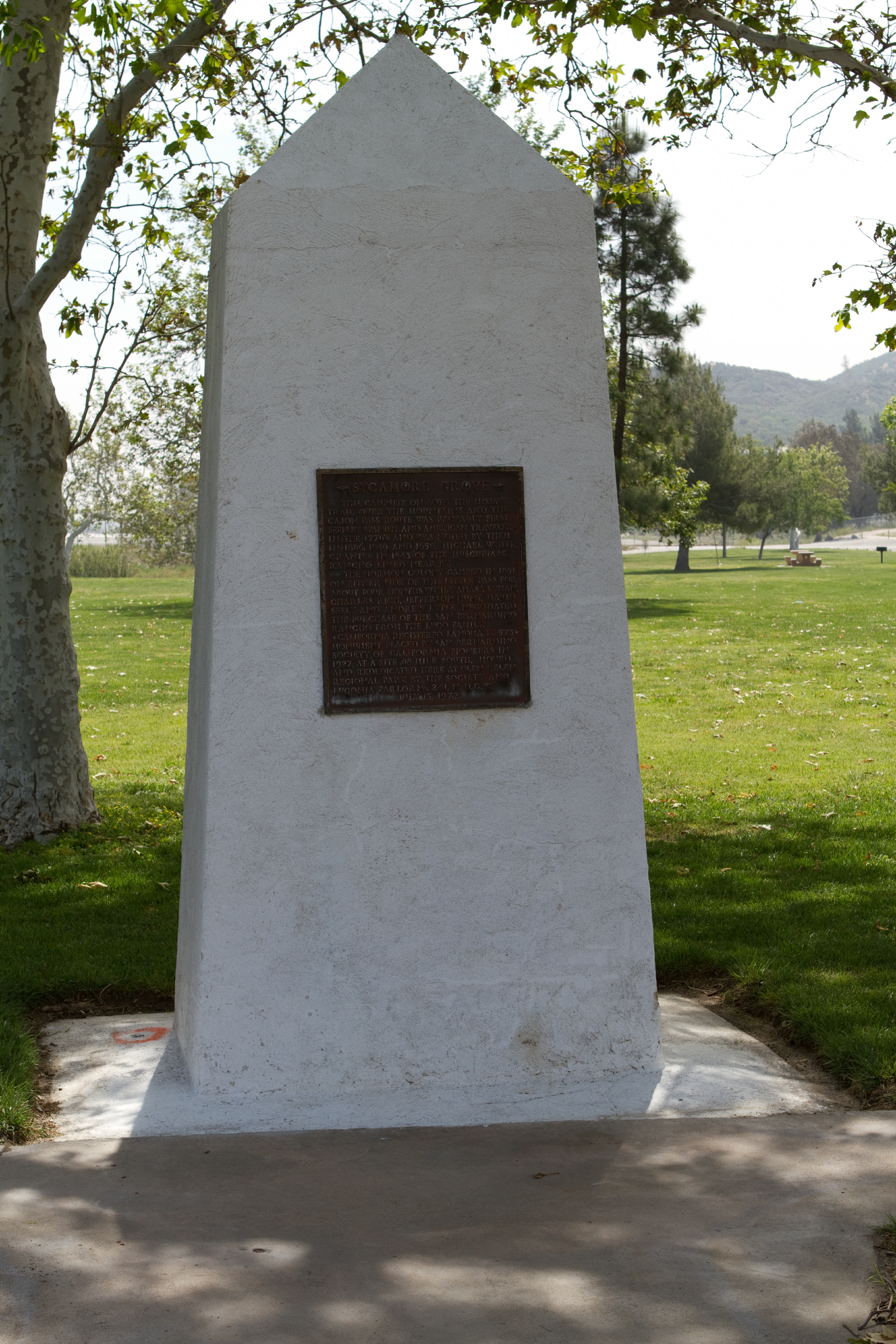
- Sycamore Grove Marker

- Location within California
- 34°12′38″N 117°24′22″W
- Location: San Bernardino County, California

History
- Built: 1851

California Historical Landmark
- Designated: April 1, 1957
- Reference no.: 573

Glen Helen Regional Park is the site of California Historical Landmark NO. 573 Sycamore Grove, designation given on April 1, 1957. The marker's current location is at 2555 Devore Rd, 0.7 mi W of Devore. The monument was relocated to the park in 1972, from its original location at Sycamore Grove, which was located 1 mile (1.6 km) from the park. Sycamore Grove was the first rest stop after the old Native American Mohave Trail left the West Fork Mojave River, following the trail, to cross the San Bernardino Mountains at Monument Peak, descending into Cajon Canyon on the ridge between Cable Canyon and Devil Canyon. This route was used by Father Francisco Garcés in March 1776 and Jedediah Smith in 1826.

Sycamore Grove, named by the 1851 Mormon colonists, later called Martin's Ranch, Sycamore Valley Ranch, and Glen Helen Ranch, was a rest and water spot at the bottom of Cajon Pass on the Old Spanish Trail mentioned as a camp in the itinerary of Antonio Armijo in 1830. It was also located at the mouth of a pass at 34°12′17″N 117°24′39″W, (informally known as Devore Pass), between Sycamore Grove and Sycamore Flat that the trail passed over and then followed westward to the Mission San Gabriel. Sycamore Grove also lay within the boundaries of the 1843 Rancho Muscupiabe land grant.

From 1848, Sycamore Grove served as a stop on the Mormon Road, a wagon road between Salt Lake City and Los Angeles. In 1850, David W. Cheesman, a lawyer heading west to California with his family from Indiana on the Mormon Road, described what became Sycamore Grove:

"... this was the most beautiful spot; a small valley dotted with large sycamores and clover nearly waist high."

For several months in 1851 the grove was the camp for the Mormon colonists who were negotiating the purchase of the Rancho San Bernardino, that became the site of Fort San Bernardino, and later the city, of San Bernardino.

=== Grove history ===
In 1847, the wagon road known as the Mormon Road, between Salt Lake City and Los Angeles, was pioneered by a party of Mormons under Captain Jefferson Hunt. This wagon road closely followed the western part of the Old Spanish Trail from Parowan, diverting where necessary to allow wagons to pass. Sycamore Grove was the stop on that road at the foot of the Cajon Pass. This wagon road was used during the California Gold Rush by Forty-niners and later immigrants to California seeking to avoid the fate of the Donner Party, crossing the snow-bound Sierra Nevada in winter.

Between June and September 1851, Sycamore Grove was the first camp of the parties of Mormon colonists, who founded the city of San Bernardino. They included groups led by Captain Jefferson Hunt, Amasa Lyman, Charles C. Rich, David Seely, and Andrew Lytle.

=== California Historical Landmark Marker ===
The marker at the site reads:

∽ Sycamore Grove ∽
This campsite on both the Mojave Trail over the mountains and the Cajon Pass Route was probably first seen by Spanish and American travelers in the 1770s and was noted by them in 1806, 1849 and 1850. Michael White, grantee in 1843 of the Muscupiabe Rancho lived near by.
The Mormon colony camped in 1851 on either side of this little pass for about four months while Amasa Lyman, Charles Rich, Jefferson Hunt, David Seely and Andrew Lytle negotiated the purchase of the San Bernardino Rancho from the Lugo family.
◆ California Registered Landmark 573 ◆
Monument placed by San Bernardino Society of California Pioneers in 1927 at a site .08 mile south, moved and rededicated here at Glen Helen Regional Park by the Society and Lugonia Parlor No. 241, N.D.G.W.
July 15, 1972
