= Santa Fe And Salt Lake Trail Monument =

California Historic Landmark

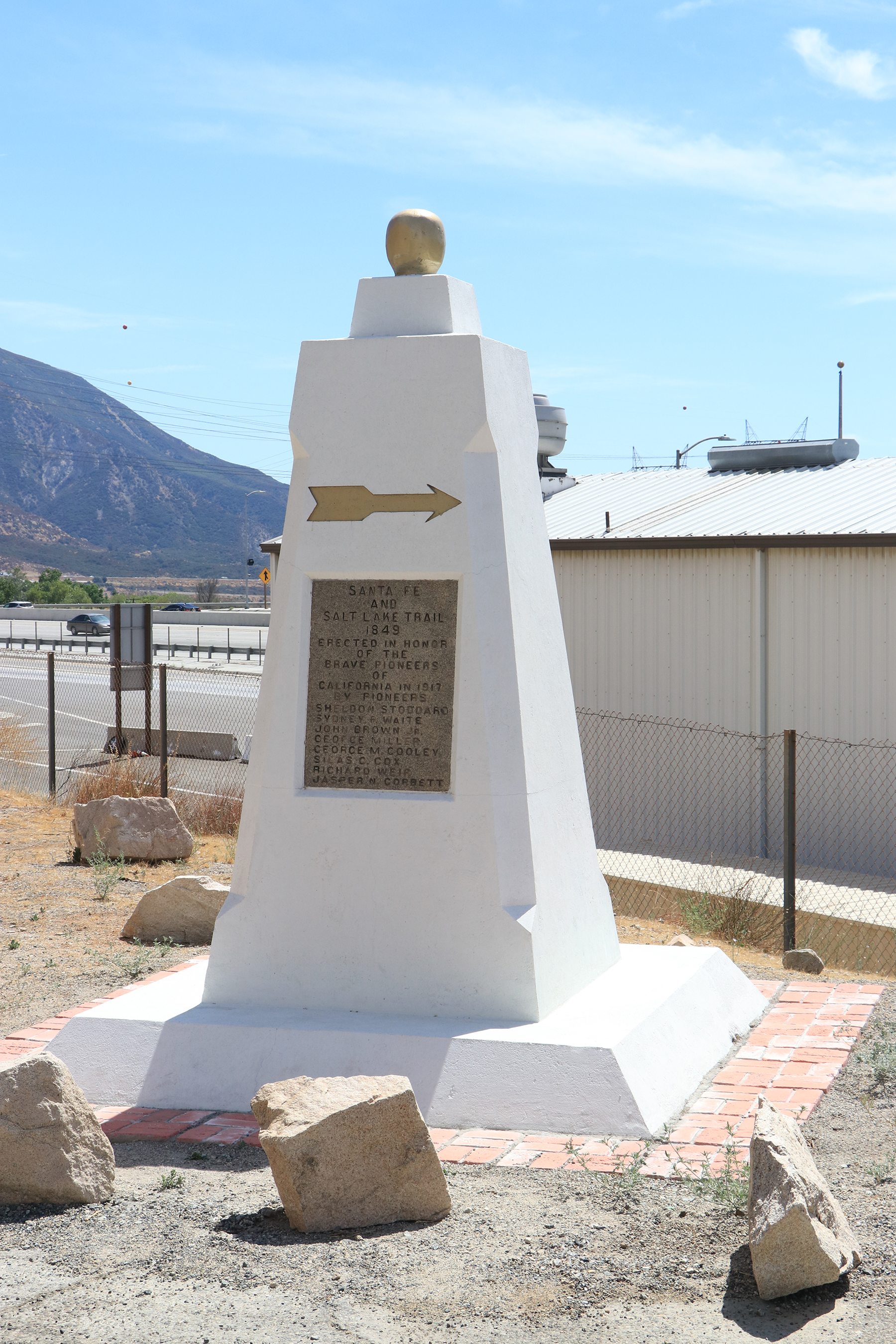
- Santa Fe And Salt Lake Trail Monument

- Location within California Location within the United States
- 34°18′23″N 117°28′00″W
- Location: Cajon Pass, California

History
- Built: 1917

Site notes
- Architect: Pioneer Society of San Bernardino

California Historical Landmark
- Designated: May 17, 1957
- Reference no.: 576

The Santa Fe And Salt Lake Trail Monument is a 1917 monument which marks the approximate place where the Old Spanish Trail and Mormon Road passed through Cajon Canyon near Cajon Pass in modern-day San Bernardino County, California. It was built by the Pioneer Society of San Bernardino to remember and honor the pioneers that traveled to California.

The monument was built after the canyon road was moved away from the nearby Stoddard-Waite Monument, which had been constructed for a similar purpose just a few year prior. Located just off the Interstate 15 (formerly U.S. Route 66), the white marker is 12 feet tall and 7 feet square at the base and was designated a California Historic Landmark (No.576) on May 17, 1957.

== History of the area ==
Cajon Pass was home to the Serrano Indian, Native Californians that lived in the nearby Atongaibit village, in what is now Hesperia.

In Summit Valley was the village of Guapiabit, and in Cajon Canyon the village of Amuscopiabit. The pass was used by native in prehistory. The San Andreas Fault runs through and made the 3,777 ft (1,151 m) mountain pass between the San Bernardino Mountains and the San Gabriel Mountains in Southern California. One side in the Mojave Desert and the other the Los Angeles Basin.

=== Arrival of the pioneers ===
The monument is dedicated to the pioneers of California, including San Bernardino pioneers Sheldon Stoddard and Sydney P. Waite who passed through the area in late 1849. They were part of a conglomerate of wagon trains that left Salt Lake City for California's Gold Country. Many in this group choose to take a shortcut, but after it became difficult, returned to the established trail and safely arrived in the San Bernardino Valley under the leadership of Captain Jefferson Hunt. However, some continued on the shortcut and became known as the Death Valley '49ers.

== Monument builders ==
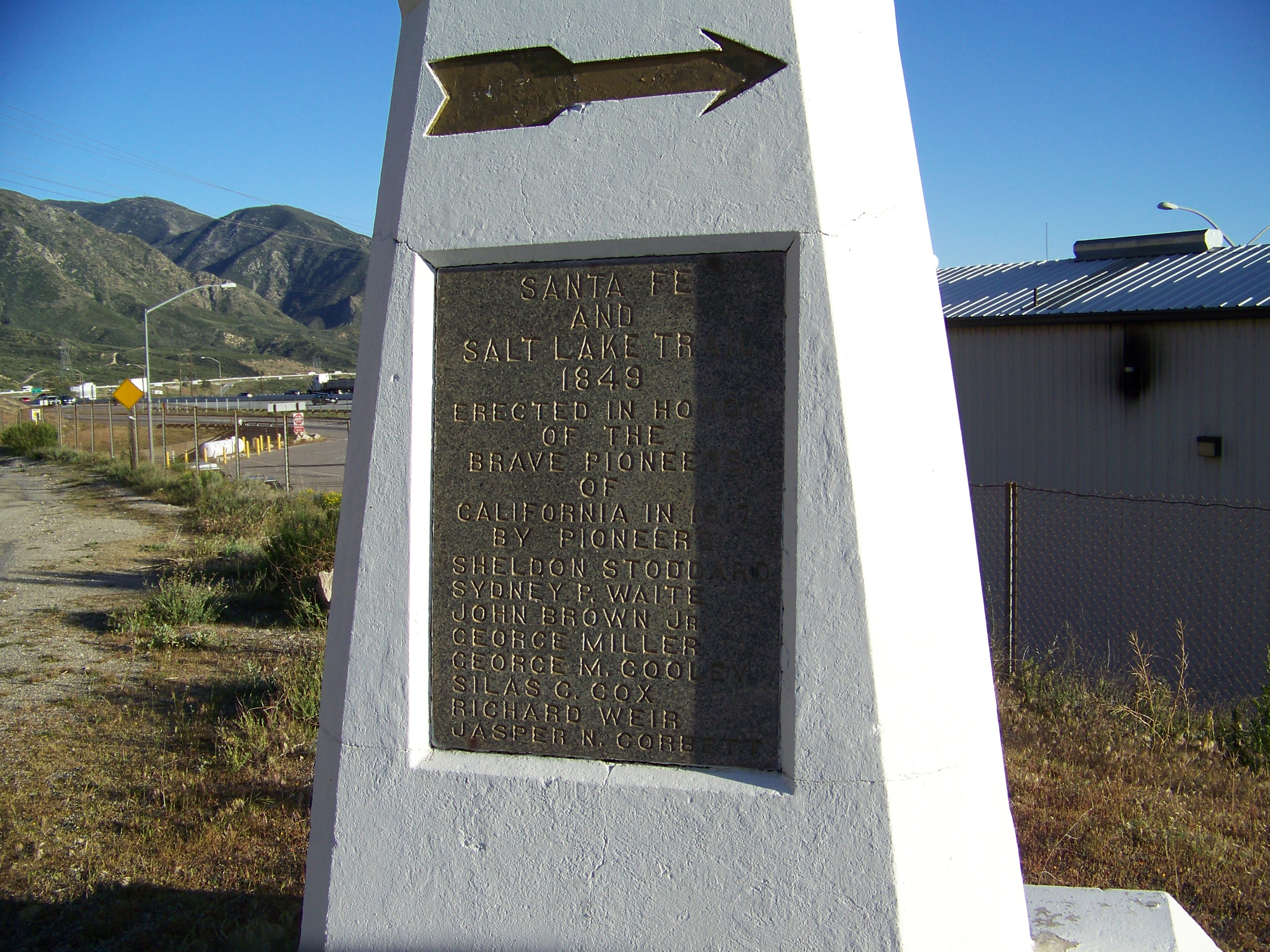
Close up of the monument's plaque

The names of the Pioneer Society of San Bernardino members that built the monument in 1917 are on the monument: Sheldon Stoddard, Sydney P. Waite, John Brown Jr., George Miller, George M. Cooley, Silas C. Cox, Richard Weir, and Jasper N. Corbett.

- Sheldon Stoddard (February 8. 1830– ) Survived the 1849 trip to California. Was a pioneer of San Bernardino. Cross the Mojave Desert a few more times.
- Sydney P. Waite: Survived the 1849 trip to California. Became lifelong friends with Sheldon Stoddard on the trip west. With Stoddard took wagon apart so they could be take over the rocky rough trip over Cajon Pass. Moved to near the San Gabirel Mission. Waite purchased the Los Angeles Star. Became the first postmaster. Moved to San Bernardino in 1858.
- John Brown Jr.: A pioneer of San Bernardino and a lawyer in San Bernardino. In 1872 John Brown made a quality pack trail toll (turnpike) road through Cajon Pass with dynamite. He fail to keep up the road and his partner John J. Driggers was taking to court in 1875, in Driggers v Lane. Secretary of the Pioneer Society of San Bernardino, planned the dedication. After Brown toll road land agreement ended, the county built an automobile road in 1915. This was part of the National Old Trails Road. In the great flood of 1938 it was washed away.
- George Miller: Wrote a book about the trip A Trip to Death Valley in 1919. This is about his 1869 trip to Death Valley.
- George M. Cooley: Pioneer of San Bernardino, opened a hardware store: Cooley-Betterly Hardware. He sold the store in 1925.
- Silas C. Cox: President of Pioneer Society of San Bernardino, planned the dedication.
- Richard Weir: Active in the Pioneer Society of San Bernardino. Died in San Bernardino in April 1932.
- Jasper N. Corbett (Jap Corbett), Came to California in 1856. Pioneer of San Bernardino, prospector. Born in 1843 in Jackson County, Indiana. Worked on the old Moses Daley ranch. Married Miss Adelaide Daley. Active in the Pioneer Society of San Bernardino.

== Marker ==
California Historical Landmark Marker #576 at the Santa Fe And Salt Lake Trail pass site reads:

- Santa Fe And Salt Lake Trail 1849, Erected in honor of the brave pioneers of California, in 1917 by Sheldon Stoddard, Sydney P. Waite, John Brown, Jr., George Miller, George M. Cooley, Silas C. Cox, Richard Weir, and Jasper N. Corbett.

In addition to building the monument, the Pioneer Society of San Bernardino built a log cabin, picnic tables and benches in the mountains and San Bernardino for the public to use.

== Trail misnomer ==
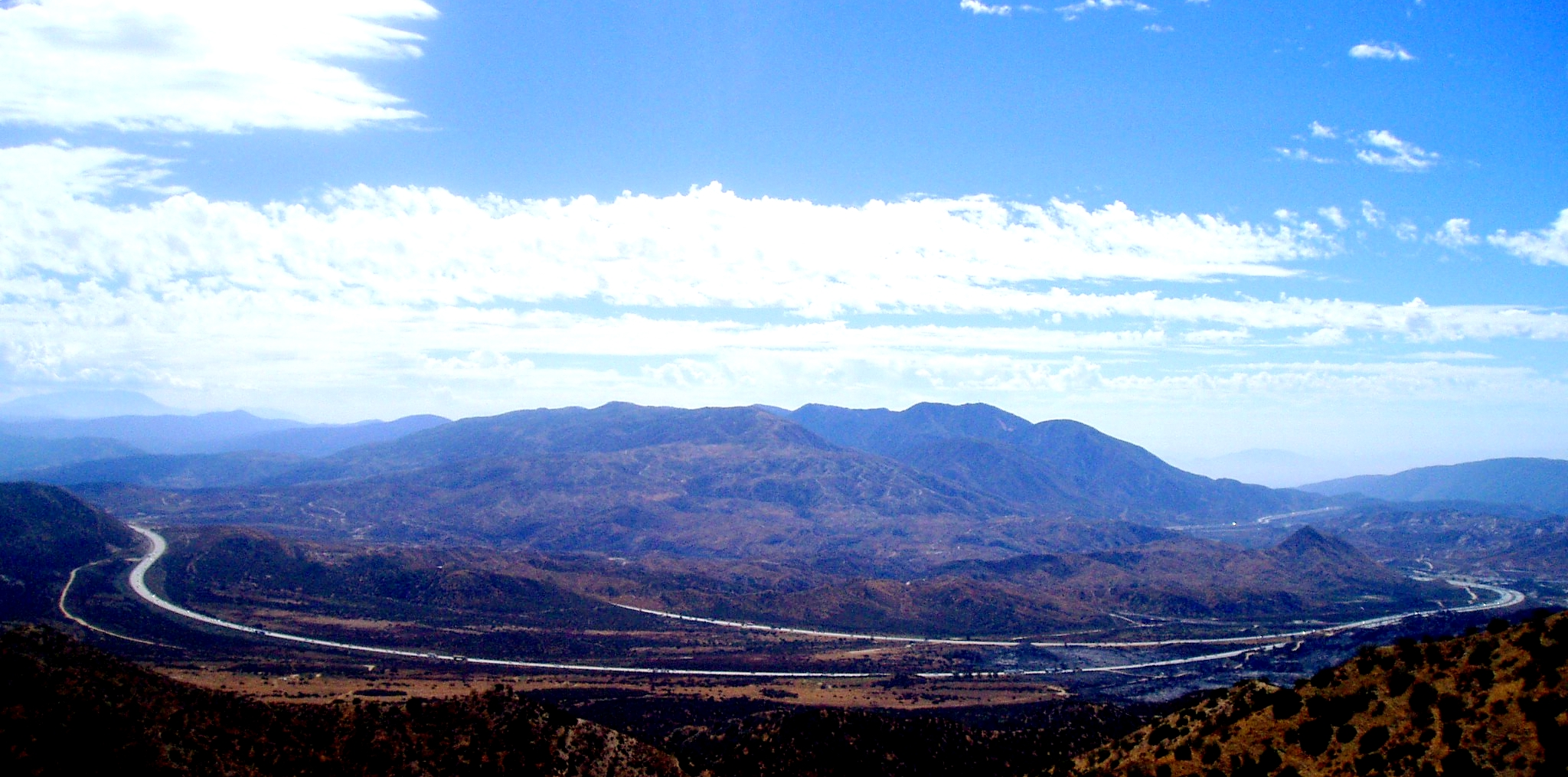
I-15 passing over Cajon Summit in the Cajon Pass

The trail name found on the monument—"Santa Fe and Salt Lake Trail"—has resulted in confusion as it doesn't exist in historical records. While there is a Santa Fe Trail in the United States, it runs from Missouri to New Mexico. According to historian E. Leo Lyman, the trail between Salt Lake City and southern California took on many different names over the years, with the "Southern Route" being the most commonly used name during the period (today this is known as the Mormon Road). When constructing the monument, the Pioneer Society may have used the name Santa Fe and Salt Lake Trail as part of a branding effort to capitalize on the Santa Fe name.

Santa Fe in the trail name may refer to the Old Spanish Trail, which passed through the canyon as well.

== See also ==
- California Historical Landmarks in San Bernardino County, California
- Harry Wade Exit Route
- Jedediah Smith
- Mormon Trail Monument
- Westward Expansion Trails
