= 1872 California-Nevada State Boundary Marker =

- U.S. National Register of Historic Places
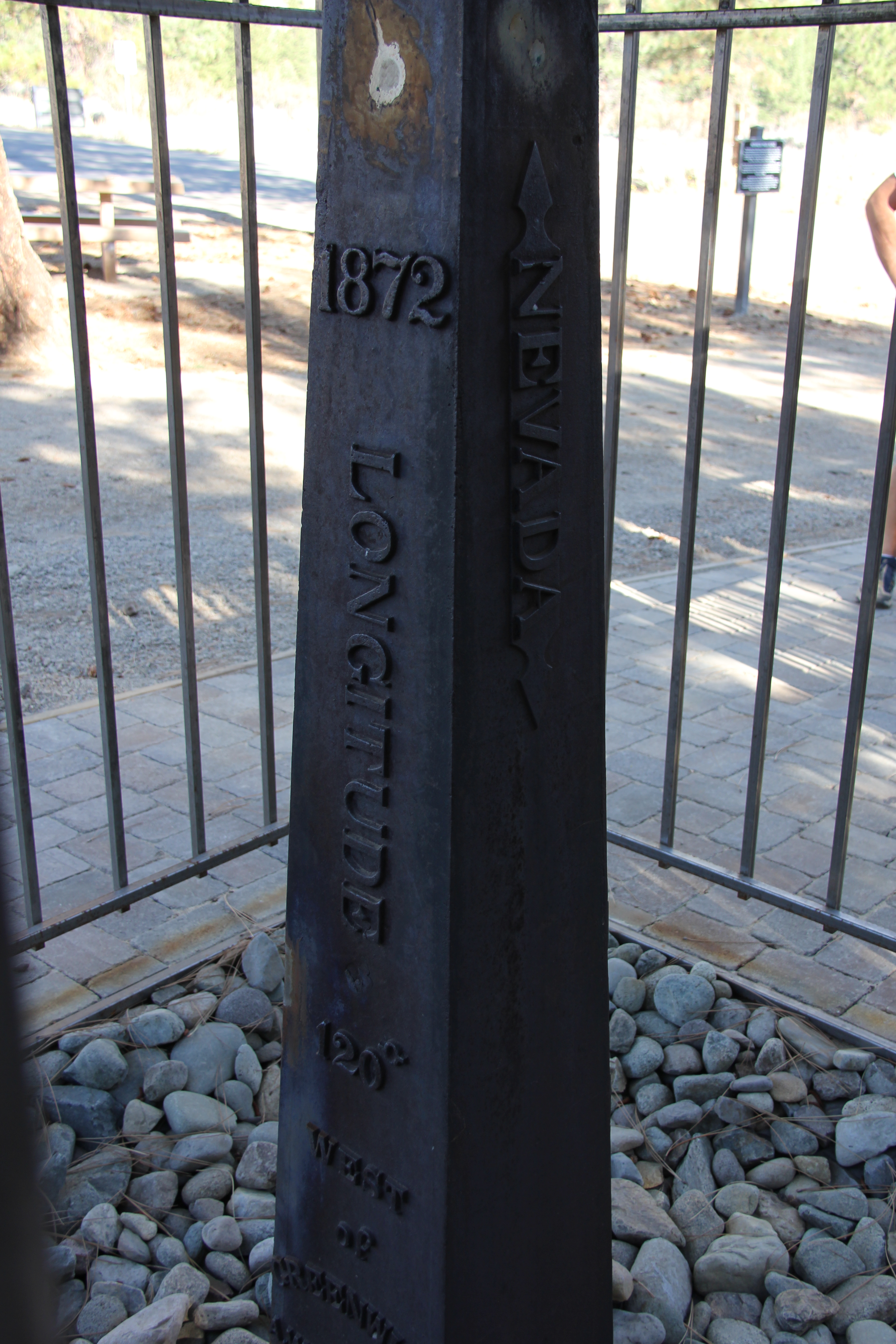
- The Nevada side of the marker

- Location within Nevada
- Location: South side of Henness Pass Rd at the California-Nevada state line
- Nearest city: Verdi, Nevada
- Coordinates: 39°31′27.8″N 120°0′6.7″W
- Built: 1872
- Architect: Alexey Von Schmidt
- NRHP reference No.: 81000387
- Added to NRHP: August 27, 1981

The 1872 California-Nevada State Boundary Marker marks the initial point for the 1872 survey delineation of the state line between California and Nevada. The boundary marker is a small cast iron obelisk near Verdi, Nevada. It is listed in the National Register of Historic Places.

== History ==
The 1850 California Constitution set the 120th meridian west between the Treaty of Guadalupe Hidalgo line at the 42nd parallel north and the 39th parallel north as an eastern border of the state. Between 1855 and 1900 there were six surveys to locate 120 degrees, with each locating the line differently.

Measurements as early as 1855 only gave a rough approximation of the line or were done piecemeal, and a fuller survey was done for private purposes and not shared publicly. As the Nevada Territory became established, it had set its statute boundary as the western ridge line of the Sierra Nevada. The Governor of California and acting Governor of Nevada Territory called for a joint survey in 1863 to settle upon the full border, the Houghton–Ives Survey, with John F. Kidder hired to do field work. Kiddler marked a line north of Lake Tahoe between about May and July, though lack of funds kept him from completing the survey. A 1867 survey led by astronomer and surveyor Daniel Major established the intersection of the 42nd parallel north and the 120th meridian west, though it did not agree with the earlier Houghton–Ives Survey as to its location.

The survey which would eventually establish the longitudinal California–Nevada border was conducted by Alexey W. Von Schmidt working under General Land Office Commissioner Willis Drummond starting in 1872. He observed Professor George Davidson of the U.S. Coast Survey using telegraph to coordinate time signals and get a location of the 120th meridian. Von Schmidt accepted these measurements and headed to lay out the route north to Oregon, placing markers of stones, wood, and iron at regular intervals; the only one to do so thoroughly. He was stopped partway through work and forced to restart from the earlier 1868-laid monument and route to the south as per his original orders. He found the southbound line three miles (4.8 km) west of his original estimate. After completing this work, he returned to the 1868 monument, measured east to his preferred line, and erected a landmark there before surveying another line south to Lake Tahoe. Major was hired again to conduct his own survey of the line later in 1872, and again drew upon his earlier conclusions. These discrepancies were intended to be solved by the Grunsky-Minto survey, authorized in 1889 by the California Legislature. This survey would use the new United States Coast and Geodetic Survey for data points, greatly increasing accuracy. Again with assistance from George Davidson, the new measurements found the (second) Von Schmidt line to be about 1,600 feet (490 m) too far west. However, this survey, too, was abandoned before completion, leaving continued doubt as to the true border.

The Houghton-Ives line had been accepted as the border, despite being poorly mapped and landmarked, along the 120th meridian until 1977 when California brought suit to Nevada in the United States Supreme Court to establish the true boundary. A ruling in 1980 established the border between Oregon and Lake Tahoe to be the Von Schmidt line, ending the dispute.

=== Marker ===
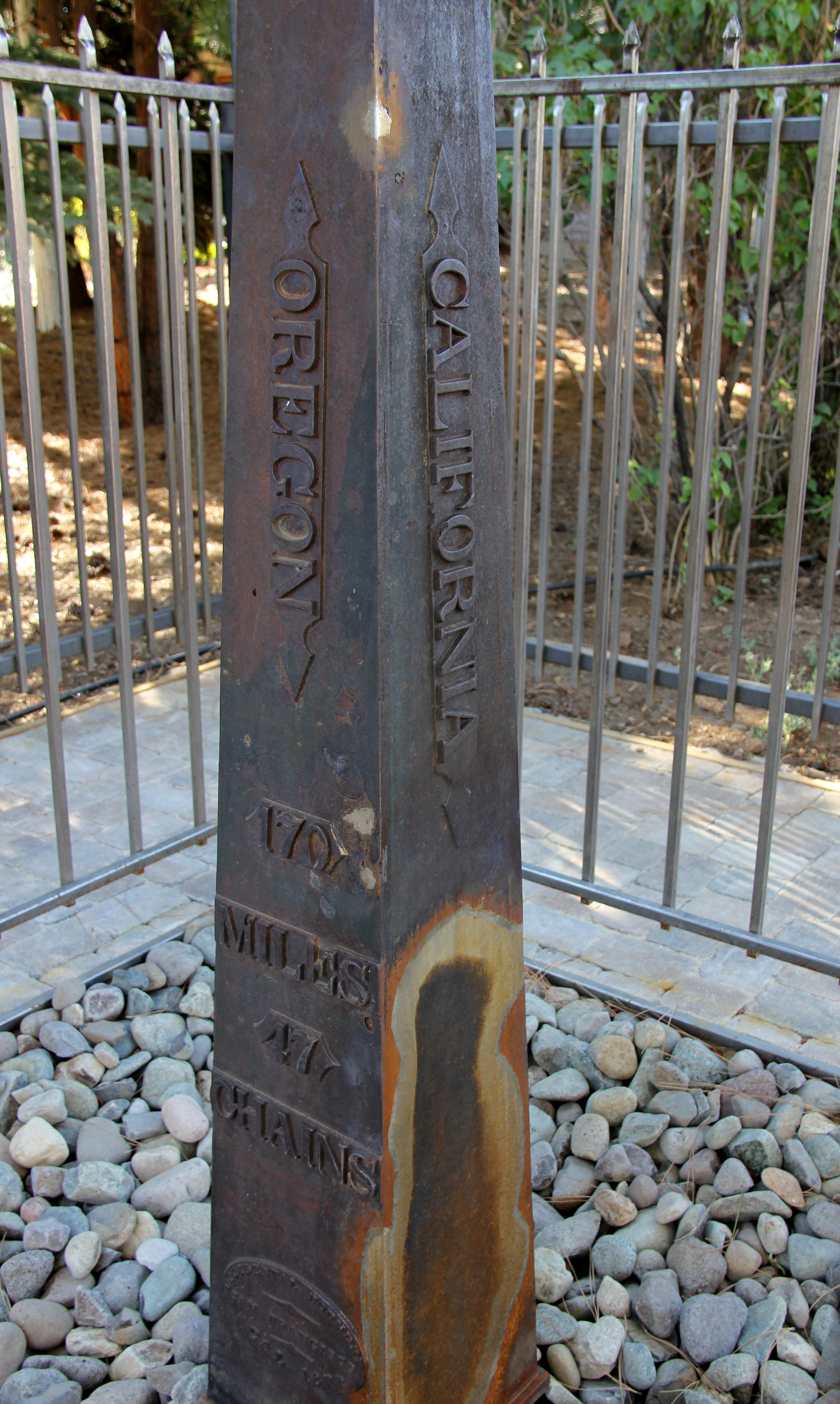
The California side of the marker

The 1872 marker near Verdi, Nevada is a four-sided cast iron pylon eight feet tall. It includes the words "CALIFORNIA" on the west face of the pylon, "NEVADA" on the east face, "1872, LONGITUDE 120 WEST OF GREENWICH, A.W. VON SCHMIDT, U.S." on the south face, and "170 MILES 47 CHAINS TO OREGON" on the north face. (170 miles 47 chains is equivalent to 170.59 miles or 274.5 kilometres.)

The marker was listed in the National Register of Historic Places in 1981 because it represents the initial point of survey for the California–Nevada border, and is a remnant of this survey. By 2009, the marker had been enclosed in a crude chain link fence, though there was no other indication of its presence. The fence was subsequently upgraded to wrought iron bars and the surrounding grounds were landscaped into a park.

Google maps shows that the Verdi California–Nevada boundary marker is approximately 525 feet (160 m) west of 120 degrees longitude. NGS gives current data for another 1872 marker that may still exist at the northeast corner of California.

== See also ==
- List of National Historic Landmarks in Nevada
- National Register of Historic Places listings in Washoe County, Nevada
- Constitutional Convention (California)
- Compromise of 1850
- Utah Territory
- Organic Act
