= Hulaville Forest =

Hula Ville (Hulaville Forest, Mahan's Half Acre)
- Location within California
- 34°26′54″N 117°21′51″W
- Location: Hesperia, San Bernardino County, California

History
- Built: beginning in 1955
- Demolished: September 1997

California Historical Landmark
- Official name: Hula Ville (Site of)
- Type: Twentieth Century Folk Art Environments
- Reference no.: 939

Hula Ville, also known as Hulaville Forest and Mahan's Half Acre, was a 0.5 acres (0.20 ha) folk art environment of outdoor sculptures, and a roadside attraction of the Victor Valley area, in the Mojave Desert. It was formerly near the town of Hesperia in San Bernardino County, Southern California.

It was located on U.S. Route 66 2 miles (3.2 km) west of present-day Interstate 15 off Phelan Road, 6 miles (9.7 km) northwest of central Hesperia, and south of Victorville on the approach to Cajon Pass.

== History ==
Miles Mahan (1896-1997) began building Hula Ville in 1955, after retiring as a 'carny,' or carnival worker at the Venice Pier and Santa Monica Pier. Over the years, he created folk art sculptures and signs painted with poems and sayings for the folk art environment.

The outdoor artworks included hanging wine- and beer-bottle tree sculptures on Joshua trees and wooden posts, painted poems and prose on desert sandblasted wood signs, and other folk art elements adorned with dolls, award statues, and other found objects. It included his residence, a pickup truck camper without truck, and a homemade miniature golf course bordered with half buried bottles. It was free of charge, with donations accepted from visitors.

It also included a large dancing hula girl sign at the entrance, a business discard rescued and erected by Mahan. The crude hand-lettered sign beneath her read: "People travel through the state, how little will they know her fate, for traveler who'll ever be the wiser, her life was saved by the Supervisors." Busses traveling to Las Vegas from Los Angelus would stop and Miles would entertain them by dancing on his little wooden stage and they would leave tips for he could dance well up into his eighties. He loved guessing peoples weights as he did working with the carnivals and he watched Hesperia grow from a weed into the city it is today. He loved to talk Real Estate and met a lot of people over the years which he mentions in his poem books. Whiskey Pete and Scotty from Death Valley was friends of his and Miles was quite the story teller which were all true stories. He appeared on the Johnny Carson Show as he was invited back by Johnny due to his out spoken personality 2 or 3 times and they would send a limo out to pick him up and bring him back.

Miles Mahan moved to a convalescent home in 1995, and died on April 15, 1997. Hula Ville was demolished in September 1997.

== Present day ==
The site of Hula Ville is a California Historical Landmark, listed under the Twentieth Century Folk Art Environments category.

The California Route 66 Museum in Victorville became the new home of the Hula Girl sign, other Mahan folk art items such as the bowlegged "Howdy" cowboy sign, and exhibits a scale miniature version of Hula Ville−Mahan's Half Acre.

== See also ==
- List of California Historical Landmarks
- California Historical Landmarks in San Bernardino County, California
