= Chimney Rock (Lucerne Valley, California) =

California historic landmark

Chimney Rock, Lucerne Valley California
- Location within California
- 34°27′01″N 117°00′14″W
- Location: Lucerne Valley, California

History
- Built: 1867

California Historical Landmark
- Designated: June 6, 1960
- Reference no.: 737

Chimney Rock was designated a California Historic Landmark (No.737) on June 6, 1960. It is located near Lucerne Valley, California in the mountains north of the Rabbit Springs Dry Lake and California State Route 18 near the Rabbit Springs Road junction. It is the site of the last battle between immigrant settlers and a Native American tribe in the Mojave Desert. Conflicts between Indians and white settlers over the rich lands of the San Bernardino Mountains ended in the battle at Chimney Rock on February 16, 1867. The Indians defended themselves against the settlers, but in the end retreated into the desert. A historical marker is beside Highway 18, next to the welcome sign on the town's western border.

== Background ==
As settlers entered the area of Lucerne Valley and the San Bernardino Mountains, conflict with local Native Americans started. Polito Spanish settlers were killed in 1863 in an Indian attack at Little Sand Canyon. As the Indians departed they took Sam Pine's mule. In Cajon Pass that year a Doctor Smith was shot in an attack. In 1866 Ed Parrish, Pratt Whiteside and Nephi Bemis were killed by Chemehuevi Indians while watching the Mojave River Dunlap ranch's cattle. In 1867 Bill Kane's house was burnt down and his horse taken. Bill Kane and his posse had a shoot out the next day. On seeing as many as 200 Indians, a larger posse was formed. The larger posse including: W.F. Holcomb, Bill Kane, Jack Martin, John St. John, Samuel Bemis, Edwin Bemis, Bill Bemis, Harrison Bemis, Bart Smithson, John McGarr, Johnathan Richardson, Frank Blair, George Armstrong, George Birdwell, Joseph Mecham, Jack Ayres, George Miller, David Wixom, ‘Noisy’ Tom Enrufty, Sam Button, a preacher named Stout, Stout's son and his son-in-law, Griffith. Johnathan Richardson was shot in the shootout on February 16, 1867, but survived. Griffith broke his arm, but survived. In all there were 32 days of tracking and fighting.

== Markers ==
Marker at the site reads:

- Conflicts between Indians and white settlers over the rich lands of the San Bernardino Mountains culminated in The Battle at Chimney Rock on February 16, 1867. Although the Indians defended themselves fiercely, they were forced to retreat into the desert. In the years following, the Indians' traditional mountain food-gathering areas were lost to white encroachment. Erected 1986 by State Department of Parks and Recreation in cooperation with Billy Holcomb Chapter No. 1069, E Clampus Vitus, Lucerne Valley Museum Association, and Lucerne Valley Chamber of Commerce. (Marker Number 737.)

== See also ==
- California Historical Landmarks in San Bernardino County, California
- History of San Bernardino, California
- Chemehuevi traditional narratives
- Classification of indigenous peoples of the Americas
