= Devil Canyon (San Bernardino County) =

Devil Canyon is a 1.5 mile long canyon on the south slope of the San Bernardino Mountains, in San Bernardino County, California. Its mouth lies at an elevation of 1,759 feet (536 meters). It heads at 34°12′53″N 117°19′43″W, the confluence of East Fork Devil Canyon and West Fork Devil Canyon at an elevation of 2,352 feet (717 meters).
