= Calvin Black =

Possum Trot
- Location within California
- 34°55′31″N 116°53′12″W
- Location: Yermo, California

History
- Built: 1954

Site notes
- Architect: Calvin Black

California Historical Landmark
- Reference no.: 939

Calvin Black (1903–1972) was an American folk artist known for carving large dolls out of wood, with which he performed as a roadside attraction in California, called Possum Trot.

Calvin Black was born on September 21, 1903, in Tennessee. Raising his brothers and sisters, he received very little education, and taught himself to read. From an early age he enjoyed Kewpie dolls, often trying to win them at carnivals. In 1933 he married his wife Ruby (born 1915), and the couple moved to California. They bought a plot of land near Calico Ghost Town in 1953, nicknamed the land "Possum Trot", and began making a living selling rocks to tourists.

At the same time, Black began carving dolls from wood, making the bodies from redwood (he claimed in an interview that he would wait for cars to crash into telephone poles so he could salvage the wood) and the noses and limbs from pine. Ruby sewed dresses for the dolls from old clothes. Black ultimately carved 86 individual dolls, each given a nameplate and a distinct personality. Early dolls featured carved and painted hair, while later ones usually sported wigs. Some dolls were even sprayed with perfume. Black recorded dialogue for them, usually in falsetto, and individually wired some dolls with tape recorders. He performed alongside the dolls in his hand-constructed "Bird Cage Theater" on the Possum Trot grounds. Outside the theater, Black constructed larger dolls that were animated using wind power to attract tourist attention.

Calvin Black died in 1972, leaving Ruby behind to tend the store and theater. Despite Calvin's request to burn the dolls, Ruby kept the collection intact. In 1977, filmmakers Allie Light and Irving Saraf released the documentary Possum Trot: The Life and Work of Calvin Black with a grant from the National Endowment for the Arts; the film included interview footage of Ruby and audio from an earlier interview with Calvin.

Ruby Black died in 1980, and the collection, including not just the dolls but also hand-painted signs and other paraphernalia, quickly ended up in collectors' hands. Individual dolls have sold for up to $80,000.

== California Historical Landmark ==
The Office of Historic Preservation (OHP) in the California State Park system has designated Possum Trot a California Historical Landmark. It shares the landmark designation number 939, "Twentieth Century Folk Art Environments (Thematic)", with other examples of folk art in the state. Though no physical marker is present at the site of Possum Trot, the OHP gives the following description on its website: "Calvin and Ruby Black began building Possum Trot in 1954 as an attraction for their rock shop as well as an artistic expression. Calvin carved the dolls, each representing someone important in his life, and Ruby made clothes for them. The animated displays were designed to entertain visitors."
