= Cable Canyon =

Valley in California, US

- Location within California

Geography
- Location: San Bernardino County, California, USA
- Borders on: San Bernardino Mountains; West Fork Cable Canyon; East Fork Cable Canyon
- Interactive map of Cable Canyon

Cable Canyon is a valley on the south slope of the San Bernardino Mountains in San Bernardino County, California. Its mouth lies at an elevation of 2,073 feet / 632 meters. Its source is at 34°13′48″N 117°22′19″W, the confluence of West Fork Cable Canyon and East Fork Cable Canyon, at an elevation of 2,671 feet / 814 meters.
