= Stoddard-Waite Monument =

Pioneer trail monument

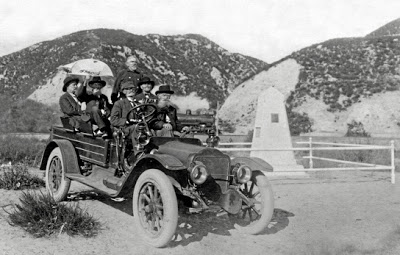
- Stoddard Waite Monument on May 13, 1913

- Location within California Location within the United States
- 34°18′13″N 117°28′00″W
- Location: Dirt road on private property, Cajon Pass, California

History
- Built: 1912

California Historical Landmark
- Designated: May 17, 1957
- Reference no.: 578

The Stoddard-Waite Monument marks the place where the Old Spanish Trail and Mormon Road passed through Cajon Canyon near Cajon Pass in modern-day San Bernardino County, California. In 1849, Sheldon Stoddard and Sydney P. Waite (whose names the monument bears) passed through the area as members of wagon trains headed to California.

The San Bernardino Society of Pioneers built the Monument in 1912. A dedication ceremony was held on May 18, 1913, and the monument was designated a California Historic Landmark (No.578) on May 17, 1957. The Marker is south of the I-15, on Cleghorn Road and is 16 miles (26 km) north of San Bernardino on a dirt road. Formerly this property was the Elsie Arey May Nature Center, but is now private land. The marker is closely related to the nearby Santa Fe And Salt Lake Trail Monument.

== Historical context ==
The Old Spanish Trail connected Santa Fe in Nuevo México with Los Angeles and the rest of Alta California, via Cajon Pass, beginning in the 1830s. In 1848, some discharged members of the Mormon Battalion would pass through the canyon, helping to establish the Southern Route/Mormon Road (which connected Southern California with Salt Lake City). Among the battalion members who became familiar with the area was Captain Jefferson Hunt, who would later lead other groups along the new route.

In 1849, Sheldon Stoddard was called by leaders of the Church of Jesus Christ of Latter-day Saints (LDS Church) to be part of the "Gold Mission." Stoddard and fellow missionaries (including George Q. Cannon) set off from Salt Lake City under the leadership of Captain James M. Flake in October 1849. Their purpose in going to California included both gold mining and missionary work.

A different company headed to California, and led by Captain Jefferson Hunt, had left Salt Lake City just before the gold missionaries. This group included both Mormons (including Charles C. Rich) and non-Mormons. Hunt's company included Sydney P. Waite and his parents. Many in this group had arrived in Salt Lake City too late in the year to cross the Sierra Nevadas by the northern route. They, along with the larger group, then hired Hunt to lead them along the southern route/Mormon Road into California.

In Southern Utah, Captain Hunt's company was overtaken by Captain Flake's gold missionary company, who by now were traveling with men on horseback led by Orson K. Smith. Smith had a map, drawn by mountain man Elijah Barney Ward, showing a faster shortcut to California. Smith convinced the gold missionaries and many in Hunt's company (including Charles C. Rich) to follow him along the shortcut, while only a small number remained with Hunt to follow the established road. Heat and lack of water brought on extreme thirst for those who took the shortcut, and as the journey grew more difficult, many decided to change course and return to Hunt's company. As members of the various companies merged under Captain Hunt, Stoddard and Waite developed a strong, life-long friendship. The combined Hunt group entered the San Bernardino Valley in December 1849. However, some of the breakaway group did not return to the established road, but continued along the shortcut. This group became known as the Death Valley 49ers and many would die along the shortcut.

In their later lives, Stoddard and Waite, along with the local society of pioneers, built the monument to commemorate the crossing. The monument was constructed along the road in use during 1912, however, the county built a brand-new paved road away from the monument just a few years later. The society then decided to build a new second monument along the new road in 1917.

== Description ==
The Stoddard-Waite Monument, California Historical Landmark #578, contains two plaques which read:

- Santa Fe and Salt Lake Trail, erected by the Pioneer Society of San Bernardino, 1912.
- Sheldon Stoddard, Sydney P. Waite came over this trail in 1849 helped erect this monument in 1912.

The California Historical Landmark book reports:

- This monument marks the western extension of the Santa Fe Trail traveled by Sheldon Stoddard and Sydney P. Waite in 1849.

== Dedication ==
At the dedication on May 18, 1913, were present:

- Sheldon Stoddard at the age of 83 years. He had crossed the pass 60 years early as one of the original pioneers with his family.
- Sydney P. Waite a survivor of the Death Valley 1849 trip.
- Capt. Jefferson Hunt who made three trips over the pass one in 1847, second in 1849 and last in 1851.
- Mrs. (Nancy) Edward Daley, daughter of Capt. Hunt.
- Hattie Irene Knight unveiled the monument, she was the great-granddaughter of Sheldon Stoddard.
- Other original '49 pioneers: Mrs. Nancy Daley, Sarah A. Rathbun and Justis Morse.
- Several hundred old pioneers.
- Federal Judge Benjamin Franklin Bledsoe gave the address.
- Judge J. W. Curtis, a grandson of Rev. I. C. Curtis, who came through the Pass in the early '60s spoke.
- Judge Rex B. Goodceli, grandfather came through the Pass in 1857, spoke.
- Attorney Grant Holcomb, grandson of pioneer William F. Holcomb, who came to San Bernardino in 1860 and discovered gold in Big Bear and Holcomb Valley.
- Pioneer William Stephen.
- Attorney R. E. Swing.
- R.T. Roberds, Mary Crandall, ane Smithson, Jane Smithson and George Miller shared their crossing story.
- Pablo Belarde crossed in 1844 by a pack mule with New Mexico blankets, shared.
- Reverend Mark B. Shaw gave the invocation.
- Mary Harris managed the American flags on site.
- Also sharing was De La Montaigne Woodward, Henry M. Willis, Judge Benjamin F. Bledsoe, W.J. Curtis and Joseph E. Rich.

=== Rededication May 18, 2013 ===
Stoddard-Waite monument was rededicated for its 100-year anniversary, by the San Bernardino Historical and Pioneer Society on May 18, 2013. The Stoddard and Waite families talked about the history of their families. Along with the rededication, the group walked to other historical sites, like on the old toll road to bridge piers for Crowder Canyon. Also discussed was the history of the Inman Ranch. President Steve Shaw opened and gave a slide show “Old Pioneer Society,” Mike Hartless, with the San Bernardino County Museum Association, shared information concerning the Indian village.

== Cajon Center / Elsie Arey May Nature Center ==
When the Spanish arrived in the area, at the location of the future monument was an Indian ranchería called Muscupiabit. Later it became a camping spot known as Willow Grove along the trail. By the 1920s, the property was owned by Carlos Alfonso Edson and later became the Inman Ranch. In 1975, the San Bernardino County Museum Association purchased the 30-acre (12 ha) ranch. The downpayment for the purchase was made with funds provided by Elsie Arey May, a teacher and member of the museum association; at the time, the association noted it wished to name a nature park on the property after her. The property later became known as the Cajon Center.

The Pacific Crest Trail runs through the area.

== Mormon Trail monument ==
In July 1985, a local Boy Scout built a new monument nearby honoring the trail used by Mormon pioneers who settled San Bernardino in 1851. The project also included refurbishing the Stoddard-Waite Monument.

== See also ==
- California Historical Landmarks in San Bernardino County, California
- Mormon Trail Monument
- Westward Expansion Trails
