= Mormon Lumber Road =

California Historic Landmark

- Location within California
- 34°14′01″N 117°17′38″W
- Location: Crestline, California

History
- Built: 1852

California Historical Landmark
- Designated: March 29, 1933
- Reference no.: 96

Mormon Lumber Road was built in 1852 up Waterman Canyon in the San Bernardino Mountains of San Bernardino County ending near Crestline, California. The Mormon Lumber Road was designated a California Historic Landmark (No.96) on March 29, 1933. The Landmark Monument was built on the side of the road in 1991. Most of the labor to build the road came from Mormon volunteers. At the top of the road, they built six sawmills in 1854. The timber was brought down from the San Bernardino Mountains to help build the City of San Bernardino, California and other settlements in Southern California. Timber was sometimes called "Mormon Banknotes". The marker is in Waterman Canyon on California State Route 18, 0.5 miles West of Crestline, California

== See also ==
- California Historical Landmarks in San Bernardino County, California
