= Edward Leo Lyman III =

Dr. Edward Leo Lyman III
- Born: April 13, 1942 (age 84); Delta, Utah
- Education: PhD
- Alma mater: University of California, Riverside
- Occupation: Professor

Edward Leo Lyman III (born April 13, 1942) is an educator, historian, author, and philanthropist. He has taught and published books and articles on the history of the western United States for over 35 years. He received his doctorate from University of California, Riverside in 1981.

== Educator ==
Lyman taught for 17 years at California State University, Riverside, and at the Victor Valley College. He is an emeritus professor of history at Victor Valley College and currently teaches classes part-time at Dixie State University.

== Community service ==
Lyman is a member of the Washington County Historical Society in Washington County, Utah, and is the Utah State Director of the Old Spanish Trail Association.

== Published works ==
- Lyman, Edward Leo (1986). Political Deliverance: The Mormon Quest for Utah Statehood. Champaign, IL: University of Illinois Press. ISBN 9780252012396.
- Lyman, Edward Leo (1996). A History of Millard County. Salt Lake City, UT: Utah State Historical Society.
- Lyman, Edward Leo (1996). San Bernardino: The Rise and Fall of a California Community. Champaign, IL: Signature Books. ISBN 978-1560850670.
- Lyman, Edward Leo (2009). Amasa Mason Lyman: Mormon Apostle and Apostate, a Study in Dedication. Salt Lake City: University of Utah Press. ISBN 978-0874809404.
- "Statehood, Political Allegiance, and Utah's First U.S. Senate Seats: Prizes for the National Parties And Local Factions". Utah Historical Quarterly. 63 (3): 341–356. doi:10.2307/45062255. JSTOR 45062255. S2CID 254446428.
- "The Arrowhead Trails Highway: The Beginnings of Utah's Other Route to the Pacific Coast". Utah Historical Quarterly. 67 (4): 242–264. doi:10.2307/45062500. JSTOR 45062500. S2CID 254438082.
- Lyman, Edward Leo (2001). The Arduous Road: Salt Lake to Los Angeles, the Most Difficult Wagon road in American History. Victorville: Privately printed. ISBN 978-0970952509.
- Lyman, Edward Leo (2004). The Overland Journey from Utah to California: Wagon Travel from the City of Saints to the City of Angels. Reno: University of Nevada Press.
- "Caught in Between: Jacob Hamblin and the Southern Paiutes During the Black Hawk-Navajo Wars of the Late 1860s". Utah Historical Quarterly. 75 (1): 22–43. doi:10.2307/45062387. JSTOR 45062387. S2CID 254446479.
- Lyman, Edward (March 10, 2010). Southern Paiute Relations With Their Early Dixie Mormon Neighbors (PDF) (Speech). 27th Annual Juanita Brooks Lecture. St. George, UT.
- Lyman, Edward Leo (2010). History of Victor Valley. Mohahve Historical Society. ISBN 978-0970952516.
