= San Bernardino County Court House =

- U.S. National Register of Historic Places
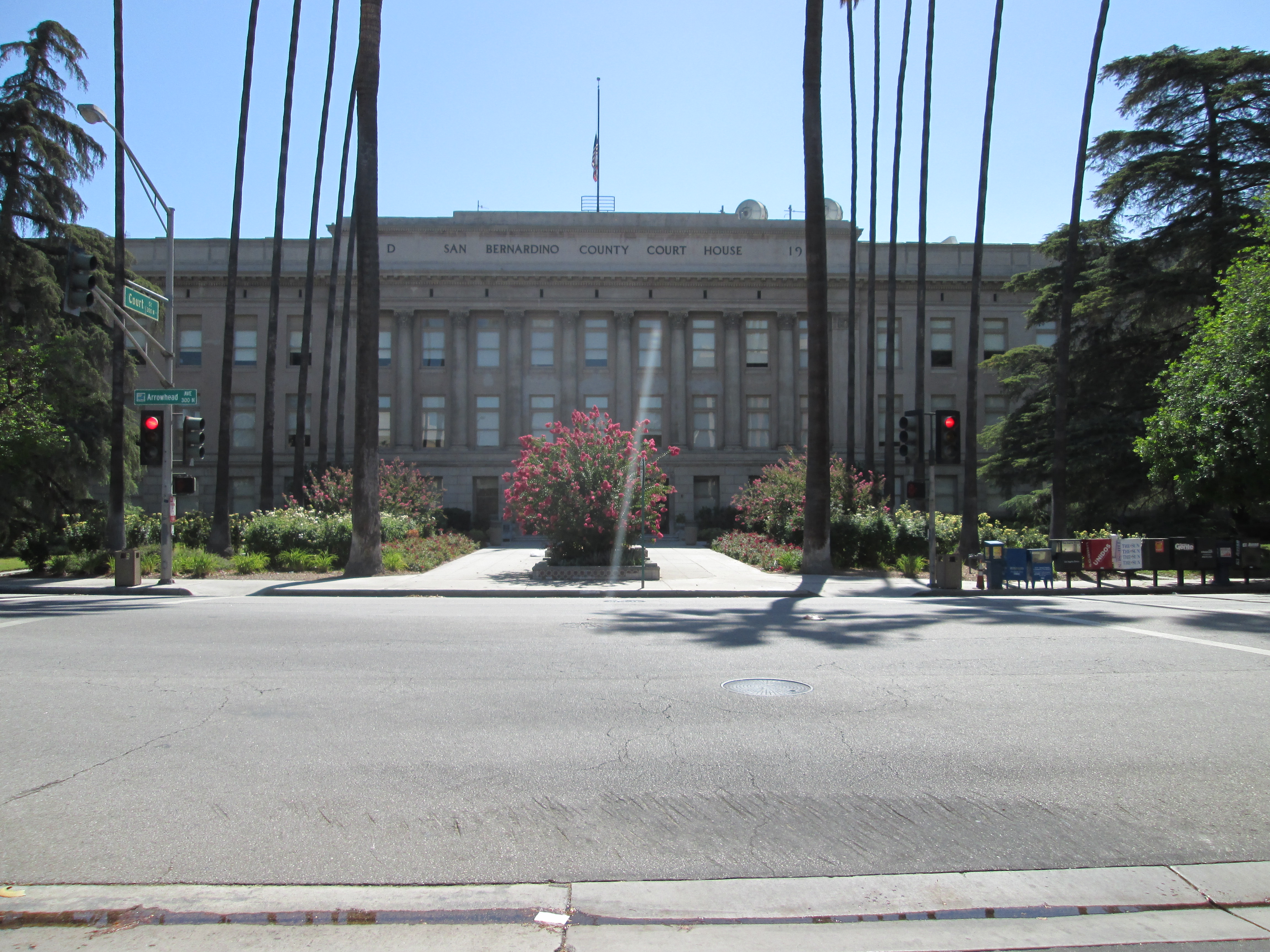

- Location within California Location within the United States
- Location: 351 N. Arrowhead Ave., San Bernardino, California
- Coordinates: 34°6′20″N 117°17′26″W
- Area: 7 acres (2.8 ha)
- Built: 1927
- Built by: R. W. Westcott
- Architect: Howard E. Jones
- Architectural style: Classical Revival
- NRHP reference No.: 97001632
- Added to NRHP: January 12, 1998

The San Bernardino County Court House, is a Classical Revival building located at 351 N. Arrowhead Ave. in San Bernardino, is the county courthouse for San Bernardino County, California. The courthouse was built in 1927 and has served as the center of county government since then. A 1937 welfare building, a 1940 county library, and a 1940 heating plant are also located on the courthouse grounds, which are extensively landscaped and include a fountain, sundial, plaque, and the remains of the former county courthouse.

The courthouse was added to the National Register of Historic Places on January 12, 1998.

== History ==
Because of an Earthquake that occurred in the 1920s, the Earlier County Courthouse was severely damaged and found unsafe. The County Supervisors suggested constructiong a new courthouse. After reviewing three sites and public opinions fond of the new courthouse idea, the supervisors bought a block on North Arrowhead Street and issued a $450,000 bond for the construction of the new courthouse. On November 17, 1925, R.W. Wescott was selected as contractor.

Noted local architect Howard E. Jones (1885 - 1966), who had proposed multiple ideas for remodels of the original Courthouse, was responsible for design. He is said to have drawn inspiration from the 1893 World Columbian Exposition in Chicago and the recent City Beautiful movement, which sparked the popularisation of Classical Revival and other monumental Architectural styles in the United States.

== Description ==
The building's design features classical columns spanning the second and third floors, a parapet along the roof line, regularly spaced windows, and extensive use of projecting blocks on the front facade. The courthouse is faced with unpainted stone and stucco, an uncommon design choice.

It is the only surviving Classical Revival building in the city.
