= Zendejas =

Zendejas is a surname. Notable people with the surname include:

- Alex Zendejas, Mexican-American footballer
- Cristian Zendejas (born 1999), American football player
- Joaquin Zendejas (born 1960), American football player
- Luis Zendejas (born 1961), American football player
- Marty Zendejas (born 1964), American football player
- Max Zendejas (born 1963), Mexican player of American football
- Samadhi Zendejas (born 1994), Mexican actress
- Tony Zendejas (born 1960), American football player
