= Cristian Zendejas =

American football player (born 1999)

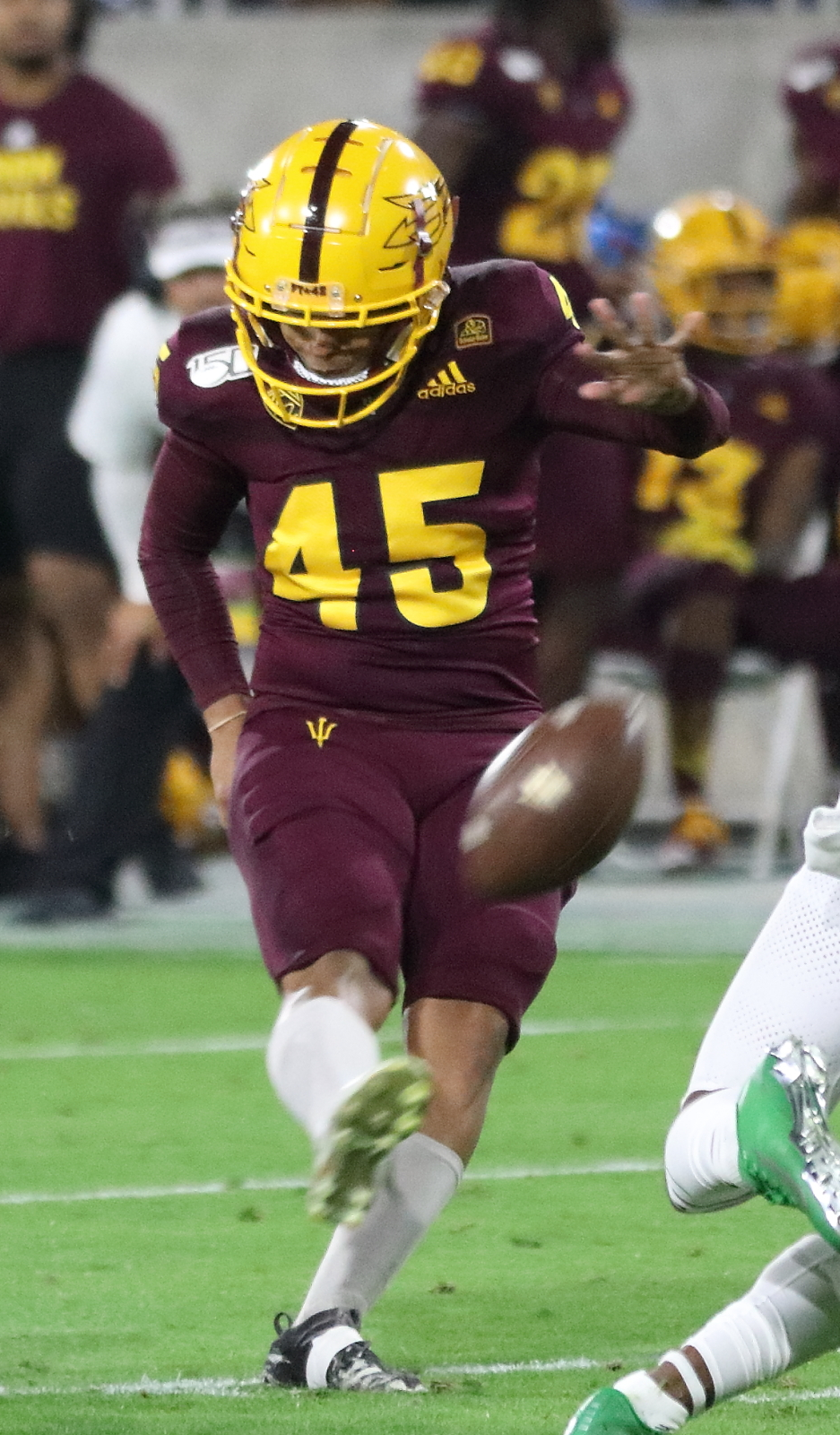

No. 45, 8
- Position: Placekicker

Personal information
- Born: 1999 (age 26–27); Phoenix, Arizona, U.S.
- Listed height: 5 ft 11 in (1.80 m)
- Listed weight: 185 lb (84 kg)

Career information
- High school: Perry (AZ)
- College: Arizona State (2017–2021)
- Stats at ESPN

Cristian Zendejas (born 1999) is an American former football kicker who played college football for Arizona State.

== Early life ==
Zendejas attended Perry High School, in Gilbert, Arizona, a Phoenix suburb. As a senior, he made 10-of-11 field goals with a long of 47 yards and 67-of-70 extra points. He received 6A first-team All-Region and first-team All-Premier Region honors.

== College career ==
Zendejas walked-on at Arizona State University. He was redshirted in 2017. As a freshman in 2018, he was one of the backups behind sophomore Brandon Ruiz.

As a sophomore in 2019, he became the team's starter at kicker, after Ruiz suffered a groin injury and was lost for the year. He began the season by making 8-for-8 in field goal attempts and was rewarded with a football scholarship after the third game against Michigan State University. He finished seventh in the nation in field goals made (23) and twentieth in field goal percentage (85.2). He tied a Sun Bowl record with 4 field goals made in a single-game. He made 23 field goals on 27 attempts, ranking seventh in the nation and first in the Pac-12 Conference. His field-goal-percentage (85.2) ranked No. 20 in the nation and he became just the fifth player in school history to make 20 or more field goals in a single-season.

As a junior in 2020, due to the COVID-19 pandemic, Arizona State only played 4 contests during the season. He was 2 out of 4 with kicks from 40-plus yards and began to be platooned in the second game with redshirt freshman Jack Luckhurst. He made 2 out of 4 field goals and 9 extra point attempts.

On January 6, 2021, he entered his name into the NCAA transfer portal. On August 28, he announced on his Instagram account that he would be returning to the team. He appeared in 12 games, making 8 out of 11 field goals (72.7%) and 40 out of 41 extra points (97.6%).

On January 24, 2022, he entered the NCAA transfer portal for the second time in his college career.

== Personal life ==
His father Luis Zendejas played kicker for ASU and, later, in the NFL. His uncles Joaquin, Max, Tony, and Marty were also kickers in the NFL. His god father Gerald Walsh also kicked in college for Hampden Sydney.

After his football career, he now owns a shoe store called Tempe Toes, in Tempe, Arizona as of 2023.
