= José Ramón Carrillo =

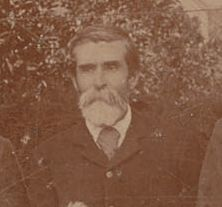
A portrait picture of Jose, likely taken late 1860s shortly before his death in his home.

Jose Ramon Carrillo (February 12, 1821 -- May 21, 1864) was a Californio landowner, majordomo for the Rains family's many land holdings, and took a responsibility in the Temecula massacre. He also fought in the Battle of Chino, on the side of a Mexican militia led by Jose del Carmen Lugo.

He was well known for resisting the American rule of the Alta California, which he viewed as a cause to support the Mexican rule.

During the Mexican–American War, he took a part in the Temecula massacre, by being called to support Chief Juan Antonio and Jose del Carmen Lugo, who also led the militia to execute the tribal leaders leading Luiseño Natives.

He later peacefully died in his adobe home, which he built in 1857.
