= Don Antonio Lugo High School =

Location
- 13400 Pipeline Avenue; Chino, California 91710; United States; 34°00′33″N 117°43′00″W

Information
- Type: Public high school
- Established: 1972
- School district: Chino Valley Unified School District
- Principal: Olivier Wong
- Teaching staff: 67.85 (FTE)
- Grades: 9–12
- Enrollment: 1,391 (2023-2024)
- Student to teacher ratio: 20.50
- Colors: Black, brown, and gold
- Athletics conference: CIF Southern Section; Mt. Baldy League
- Mascot: Conquistadores
- Website: donlugo.chino.k12.ca.us

Don Antonio Lugo High School is one of the four high schools of the Chino Valley Unified School District located in Chino, California, United States. The mascot is the Conquistador. Don Lugo High School was founded in 1972, and during that year the school only accepted freshmen. Each following year another freshman class was added until the school had all four classes for the first time in 1980.

== Notable alumni ==
- Chad Cordero - professional baseball player
- Peter Hughes - bassist for the indie-rock band The Mountain Goats
- Todd Jones - frontman of the hardcore punk band Nails
- Joshua Mance - Olympic sprinter
- Leah O'Brien-Amico - three-time Olympic gold medalist with the US women's softball team
- Moriah Peters - contemporary Christian singer-songwriter
- Diana Taurasi (b. 1982) - former professional basketball player, holding the all-time WNBA scoring record, and is the most decorated Olympic athlete in any team sport
- Esera Tuaolo - football nose tackle
- George Uko - football defensive end
- Joaquin Zendejas - football kicker
- Luis Zendejas - football kicker
- Marty Zendejas - football kicker
- Max Zendejas - football kicker
- Tony Zendejas - football kicker
