= Marty Zendejas =

Mexican gridiron football player (1964–2018)

No. 2
- Position: Placekicker

Personal information
- Born: November 2, 1964; Michoacan, Mexico
- Died: December 19, 2018 (aged 54)
- Listed height: 5 ft 9 in (1.75 m)
- Listed weight: 165 lb (75 kg)

Career information
- High school: Don Antonio Lugo (Chino, California, U.S.)
- College: Nevada
- NFL draft: 1988: undrafted

Career history
- Los Angeles Cobras (1988); Los Angeles Rams (1989)*
- * Offseason or practice squad member only

Awards and highlights
- 3× Division I-AA All-American (1984, 1985, 1986); 3× All-Big Sky (1984, 1985, 1987); Second-team All-Big Sky (1986)

Career AFL statistics
- Field goals: 4/16 (25%)
- Extra points: 18/28 (64%)
- Stats at ArenaFan.com

Martin Zendejas (November 2, 1964 – December 19, 2018) was a Mexican placekicker in the Arena Football League (AFL) for the Los Angeles Cobras. He played college football at the University of Nevada.

== Early life ==
Zendejas, was born in Zacapu, Michoacan. His parents moved the family to Chino, California. He attended Ramona Junior High School, before transferring to Don Antonio Lugo High School.

== College career ==
Zendejas followed his older brother Tony and accepted a football scholarship from the University of Nevada. He was named a starter at placekicker as a freshman, after his brother graduated. He made 22 out of 27 field goals and 35 out of 37 extra points.

As a sophomore, he converted 19 out of 24 field goals, 50 out of 54 extra points, while setting a conference and school single-season record with 107 points.

As a junior, he made 14 out of 18 field goals and 53 out of 55 extra points. He also set the NCAA Division I-AA career scoring record in the 40-26 win against Eastern Washington University.

As a senior, he converted 17 out of 21 field goals and 27 extra points.

Zendejas during his career was named to three All-American teams. He still remains the All-time leading scorer at Nevada with 385 points. In 44 games, he made 80% of his career field goals (72 of 90), 96% of his career extra points (165 of 171), scored 385 points and did not have a field goal blocked.

In 2007, he was inducted into the University of Nevada Athletics Hall of Fame.

== Professional career ==
On May 19, 1988, he was signed by the Los Angeles Cobras of the Arena Football League. He converted 4 out of 16 field goals (25%). On July 1, he was placed on the taxi squad to make room for kicker Nick Mike-Mayer. He was waived on July 7.

On May 11, 1989, he was signed as a free agent by the Los Angeles Rams. He was waived on August 29, after not being able to pass Mike Lansford on the depth chart.

== Personal life ==
His brother Tony played professional football. His cousins Joaquin, Luis and Max also had success in professional football. Zendejas and his brother Tony owned Mexican restaurants in southern California.

== Death ==
On December 19, 2018, while sitting in a car with his suspected girlfriend at around 1:19 am, Zendejas was beaten in a hotel parking lot in Chino Hills, California by the woman's boyfriend. He died shortly after at the hospital, aged 54.

Ivan Mejia, 44, was booked on suspicion of murder in Zendejas' death, and detained at the West Valley Detention Center in Rancho Cucamonga, California.
