= Rancho Santa Ana del Chino =

Mexican land grant in what is now California

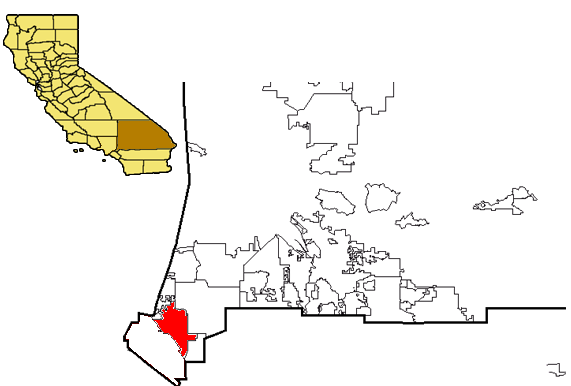
- San Bernardino, with Chino highlighted

- Location within California
- 33°59′24″N 117°43′04″W

Site notes
- Area: 22,193 acres (8,981 ha)

California Historical Landmark
- Official name: Site of the Rancho Chino Adobe of Isaac Williams
- Designated: February 19, 1981
- Reference no.: 942

Rancho Santa Ana del Chino was a 22,193-acre (89.81 km^{2}) Mexican land grant in the Chino Hills and southwestern Pomona Valley, in present-day San Bernardino County, California.

It was granted to Antonio Maria Lugo in 1841 by Mexican Alta California Governor Juan Bautista Alvarado. The name literally means "Santa Ana of the Fair Hair," though there have been statements that the ranch was named for a mission mayordomo, or foreman, who had curly hair, "chino" being also a Spanish word for "curly".

The rancho site included the present day cities of Chino and Chino Hills.

== History ==
In 1841, Antonio Maria Lugo was granted rights the Rancho Santa Ana del Chino on what had been part of the San Gabriel Mission lands used for grazing mission horses and cattle until the California missions were secularized by the Mexican government in the mid-1830s and their lands made available for private settlement.

Almost immediately after taking possession and building an adobe house on what is now Boys' Republic in the city of Chino Hills, Lugo turned over the management of the ranch to his son-in-law, Isaac Williams (1799–1856.) Williams, born in Wyoming Valley, Luzerne County, Pennsylvania, had resided near Johnstown, Ohio and Missouri before moving to New Mexico about 1823. He remained there for several years and then joined a fur trapping expedition to California in 1832, led by Ewing Young. Williams settled in Los Angeles, became known as Julian by the locals, and worked as a merchant before marrying Maria de Jesus Lugo in 1839. After bearing three children, Maria de Jesus died in childbirth in 1842. The following year, an additional three square leagues (for a total of eight square leagues) was granted by Governor Micheltorena to Williams.

While at the Chino ranch, Williams successfully grazed thousands of cattle for the hide and tallow trade, taking these products to the crude harbor at San Pedro Bay. William Heath Davis, in his autobiography, discusses 1846–1847 trade with Williams and a visit to the ranch in that latter year.

=== Battle Of Chino ===
A notable event during the American war with Mexican California was the so-called "Battle of Chino," in which Williams and American and European compatriots, such as Benjamin D. Wilson, John Rowland, Michael White and others were surrounded by Mexican Californios defending their homeland. One of the leaders of the defenders was Williams' brother-in-law, Jose del Carmen Lugo, who ordered that the Williams house be set on fire to force the surrender of those trapped inside. The captured men were then taken to Paredon Blanco, now Boyle Heights, and held there for several weeks before being released on pledges to act peaceably. Wilson blamed Williams for too easily capitulating to the Californios and was instrumental in denying Williams state recognition for his later kindnesses to migrants coming to California. A California Historical Landmark plaque has been installed at a fire department training facility in Chino Hills adjacent to the Boys Republic property to commemorate the battle.

=== Statehood ===
With the cession of California to the United States following the Mexican–American War, the original negotiated version of the 1848 Treaty of Guadalupe Hidalgo provided that the land grants would be honored, but this provision was removed at the insistence of President James K. Polk and the United States Congress. As the California Gold Rush brought great wealth to Williams via the beef trade with the many thousands of migrants arriving to California, there were also substantial problems with squatters on Spanish and Mexican-era grants. Consequently, Congress passed a California land claims act in March 1851 and a claim for Rancho Santa Ana del Chino was filed with the Public Land Commission in 1853, and the grant, including the 22,193 acres (89.8 km^{2}) of the original rancho and the additional 13,366 acres (54.1 km^{2}) with the "Addition to the Rancho Santa Ana del Chino", was patented to Isaac Williams' daughter, Maria Merced Williams de Rains in 1869.

=== Shootout ===
After Williams' death in September 1856, Rancho Santa Ana del Chino was left to his two daughters, Merced Rains and Francisca Carlisle. The rancho became one of the stagecoach stations of the Butterfield Overland Mail in 1858, the same year Merced and her husband, John, sold their interest to Francisca and her husband Robert and purchased the nearby Rancho Cucamonga, where they lived until Rains' murder four years later. Carlisle was, in fact, accused by some of the murder of his brother-in-law, though the crime was never solved. While the Carlisles assumed full control of Chino, Robert Carlisle, embroiled in a dispute with the King family of El Monte, accusing Under Sheriff Andrew J. King of not doing enough to solve the Rains murder and for interfering in his management of the widow's estate. After attacking and wounding Andrew King, Carlisle was accosted in July 1865 by King's brothers, Frank and Houston, in the crowded saloon of Los Angeles' Bella Union Hotel, once owned by John Rains. A massive shootout led to the deaths of Carlisle and Frank King, the wounding of Houston King and wounds suffered by others.

Carlisle's widow, Francisca, continued ownership of the ranch until 1881, with parts being leased out to several persons and the remainder managed by Joseph Bridger, husband of an out-of-wedlock daughter, named Victoria Regina Williams of Isaac Williams and Maria Antonia Apis. They had three other children together, Constance E. born in 1848, a son Feliciano born in 1850 who died very young and another daughter Refugio born in 1852. Bridger built an adobe house on what is now Los Serranos Country Club in Chino Hills and served as ranch foreman from 1865 until his death in 1880. Victoria and Joseph had 8 children all on the Chino Rancho. Laurabella born 1866, Robert Rains born 1867, Thomas Joseph born 1868, Josefina born 1871, Albert James 1874, Anita R. born 1875, George Frederick born 1876 and Constance Helen born 1878.

Francisca Carlisle, meantime, married Scotch-born doctor, Frederick McDougal, who was a Los Angeles police chief and, from 1876 until his death in 1878, the city's mayor. Francisca later married Edward Jesurun and lived in Los Angeles and then Palo Alto, near San Francisco, where she died in 1926.

=== Buying The Whole Grid ===
In 1881, Richard Gird, a Tombstone, Arizona miner, purchased Rancho Santa Ana del Chino and "Addition to Santa Ana del Chino" from Francisca Williams Carlisle McDougal. Gird purchased additional lands, until his holdings included 47,000 acres (190 km^{2}), and for a number of years devoted the rancho to the raising of livestock. In 1887, amidst a massive growth boom in the region known as the "Boom of the Eighties," he subdivided the land 23,000 acres (93 km^{2}) into small ranches and 640 acres (2.6 km^{2}) into the town site of Chino.

Gird had many major plans for the Chino area, including a sugar beet factory, a railroad, a refinery for oil produced near La Puente by the Puente Oil Company, and many others. He also secured a forty-acre site for a University of California agricultural station branch that operated for several years and then moved to Riverside, forming the basis for today's University of California, Riverside campus. Unfortunately, the failure of the Boom of the Eighties by 1890, and the devastating national depression after 1893, severely impacted Gird financially.

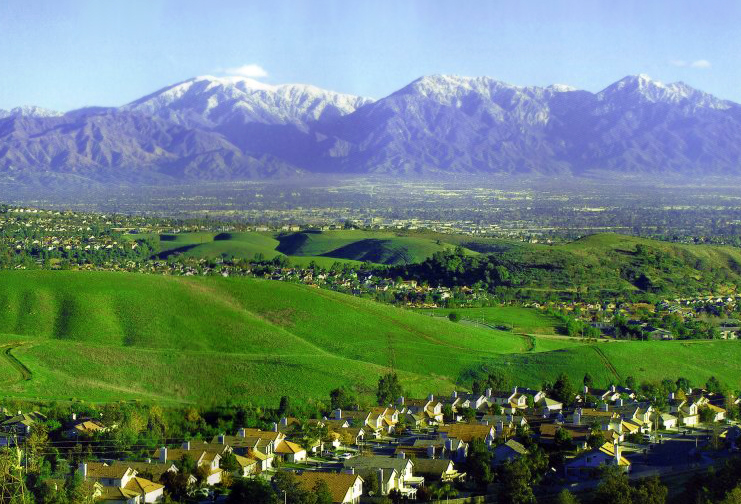
City of Chino Hills.

=== Chino Prison And Hills ===
Rancho Santa Ana del Chino was sold in 1893 to a San Luis Obispo real estate magnate and then, within two years, to a British syndicate. By 1900, a new syndicate of San Francisco and Los Angeles capitalists acquired the ranch and created a company to reconfigure the Chino townsite and work with the remainder of the ranch. In 1910, Chino was incorporated, and in 2010 celebrated its centennial.

Over the years, sales of portions of the old ranch accelerated, although major development did not come to the area until well after World War II. The state acquired land for use as prisons for men, women, and juveniles (George Junior Republic teen farm). Another notable addition was the Chino Airport. Significant suburban development, however, did not come until the late 1980s and beyond and, in 1991, the new city of Chino Hills was carved out of the western portion of the old ranch.

== Historic sites of the Rancho ==
- Pasinogna, California – Tongva settlement. This Indian village, identified by name by Hugo Reid in his seminal work on local tribes in 1852, was not, however, specified by location.
- Lugo/Williams Adobe – Jose Maria Lugo in 1841 built a large adobe home on the Rancho where Boys Republic is in Chino Hills. The home was occupied later by Isaac Williams and his heirs and then by lessor H. J. Stewart as of 1874. The skirmish known as the 'Battle of Chino' of the Mexican–American War occurred on September 26–27, 1846, during which 24 Americans led by Benjamin D. Wilson, who were hiding in the adobe house, were captured by a group of about 50 Californios.33°59′24″N 117°43′4″W
- The Joseph Bridger adobe survived until the property became Los Serranos Country Club in 1925, though the structure was later razed.33°58′9″N 117°42′2″W
