= Isaac Williams (rancher) =

American fur trapper & merchant (1799–1856)

Isaac Williams (1799–1856) was an American fur trapper, merchant, later a rancher and owner of Rancho Santa Ana del Chino in what is now the cities of Chino and Chino Hills in San Bernardino County, California.

Isaac Williams was born in Wyoming Valley, Luzerne County, Pennsylvania in September 1799. In 1810 his parents Ebenezer and Eunice Gardner Williams moved their large family further west of Pennsylvania to a new home in the Ohio wilderness. It is assumed that they followed the typical migration patterns in what was then the "Old Northwest" (created in 1787) of the United States in which immigrants moved from Pennsylvania into Ohio. Johnstown, Licking County, Ohio was where the Williams family most likely purchased 200 acres from a Revolutionary War soldier who had acquired the land for his military service. Both of Isaac's grandfathers (Thaddeus Williams and Peregrine Gardner) were veterans of the American Revolution. Many of his relatives were also casualties of the horrific Wyoming Massacre of Pennsylvania that took place on July 3, 1778.

Isaac was raised in Johnstown, Ohio from age 11 until he was in his mid-twenties. The Licking County, Ohio marriage records show that Isaac Williams married Sally Wright on November 6, 1823. They were married for several years until Sally died on April 20, 1826. They might have had a daughter from this marriage. Sally is buried at Bigelow Cemetery in Johnstown, Ohio. Most likely Isaac left Ohio for the western land of Missouri around 1826 after his wife's early death. In 1831 Isaac can be found in Fort Smith and ready to join the Bean-Sinclair trapping party for the Rocky Mountains. Historical records show Isaac to later be found at Taos where he joined the Ewing Young fur trapping expedition that arrived in Los Angeles, Alta California, on April 14, 1832. Williams remained there, where he became known as Julian by the locals, and worked as a merchant before he married Maria de Jesus Lugo, daughter of the ranchero Antonio Maria Lugo in 1839.

In 1841, Isaac Williams built a large adobe home on the 22,000-acre (89 km^{2}) Rancho Santa Ana del Chino, which his wife acquired from his father-in-law Antonio Lugo. After bearing four children, Maria de Jesus died in childbirth in 1842. The following year, an addition to the rancho of three square leagues (for a total of eight square leagues) was granted by Governor Micheltorena to Williams.

During the Mexican–American War the Battle of Chino occurred at the adobe on September 26–27, 1846, during which 24 Americans including Williams were captured by a group of about 50 Californios.

During the time of the California Gold Rush, Williams having experienced the rigors of crossing the Mojave Desert with the Young party, his rancho became a stop and a source of aid for travelers on the Mormon Road to California. Williams would send help to travelers on the desert road who were starving or had lost their animals, giving the travelers or their rescue parties food and sometimes horses or mules, or sent his own men out into the desert to do so. Located on the Southern Emigrant Trail, the adobe became a stop and later an inn famous for its hospitality to parties of Forty-niners and later travelers.

Williams died at his home in 1856. He left the majority of his estate to his daughters Merced Williams and Francisca Williams
