= Moyse Building =

- U.S. National Register of Historic Places
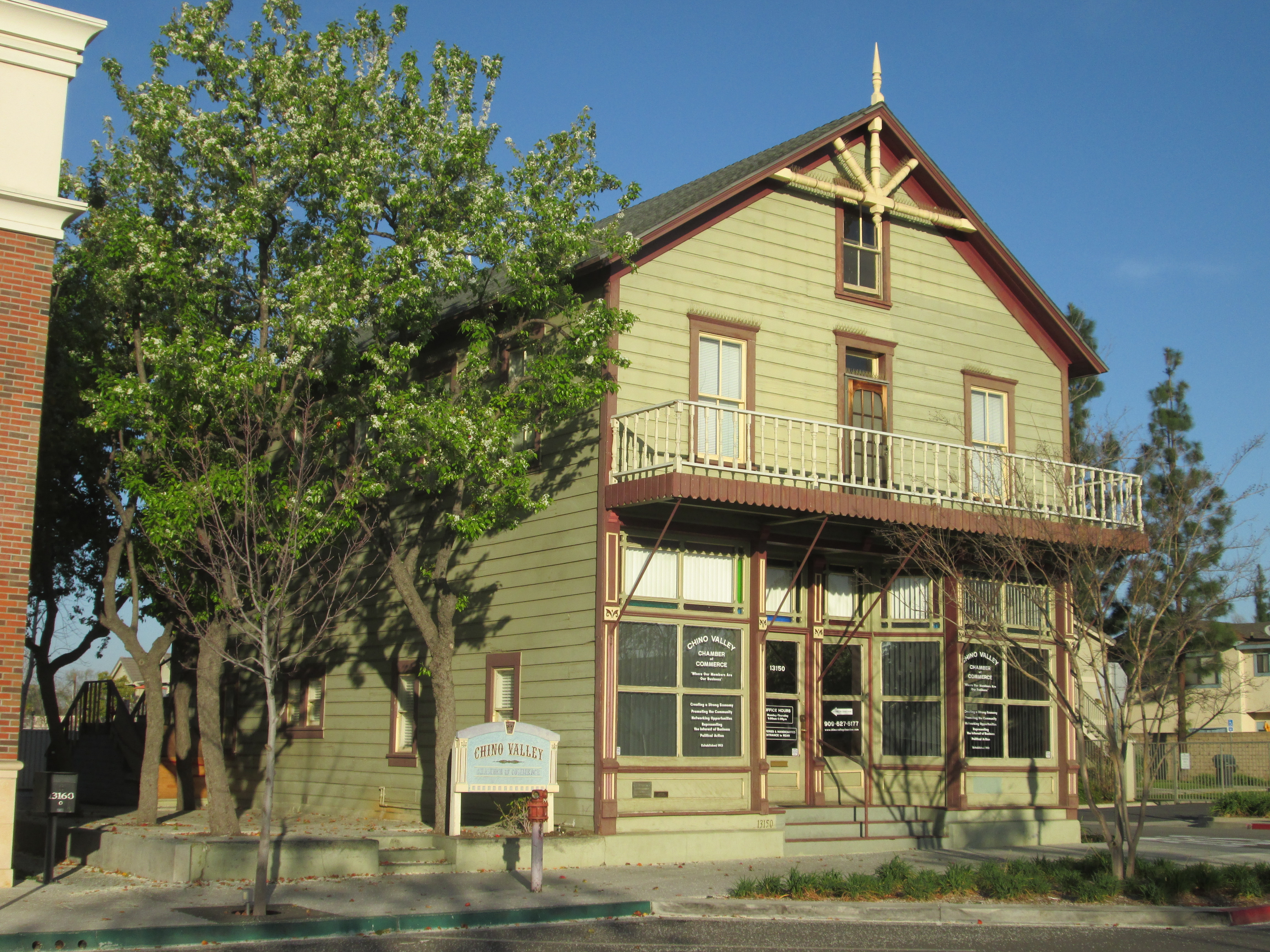

- Location within California Location within the United States
- Location: 13150 7th St., Chino, California
- Coordinates: 34°0′53″N 117°41′23″W
- Area: less than one acre
- Built: 1887
- Built by: Dawson, W.R.; et al.
- Website: https://www.chinovalleychamber.com/
- NRHP reference No.: 79000522
- Added to NRHP: February 28, 1979

The Moyse Building, also known as the Gray Building, is a historic building located at 13150 7th Street in Chino, California. Built in 1887, it is the oldest surviving building in the city. The building has served in several capacities for the city and has played a part in several civic firsts. After W. R. Dawson completed the building, he ran Chino's first post office from it. The second floor housed the city's first school, which had five students its first year. When Chino was first connected to telephone service, the Moyse Building was one of the first buildings with a connection. The building also hosted the city's first communal Thanksgiving celebration, which was led by the Rev. A. B. Orgen. In recent years, the building has housed the Chino Chamber of Commerce.

The building was added to the National Register of Historic Places on February 28, 1979.

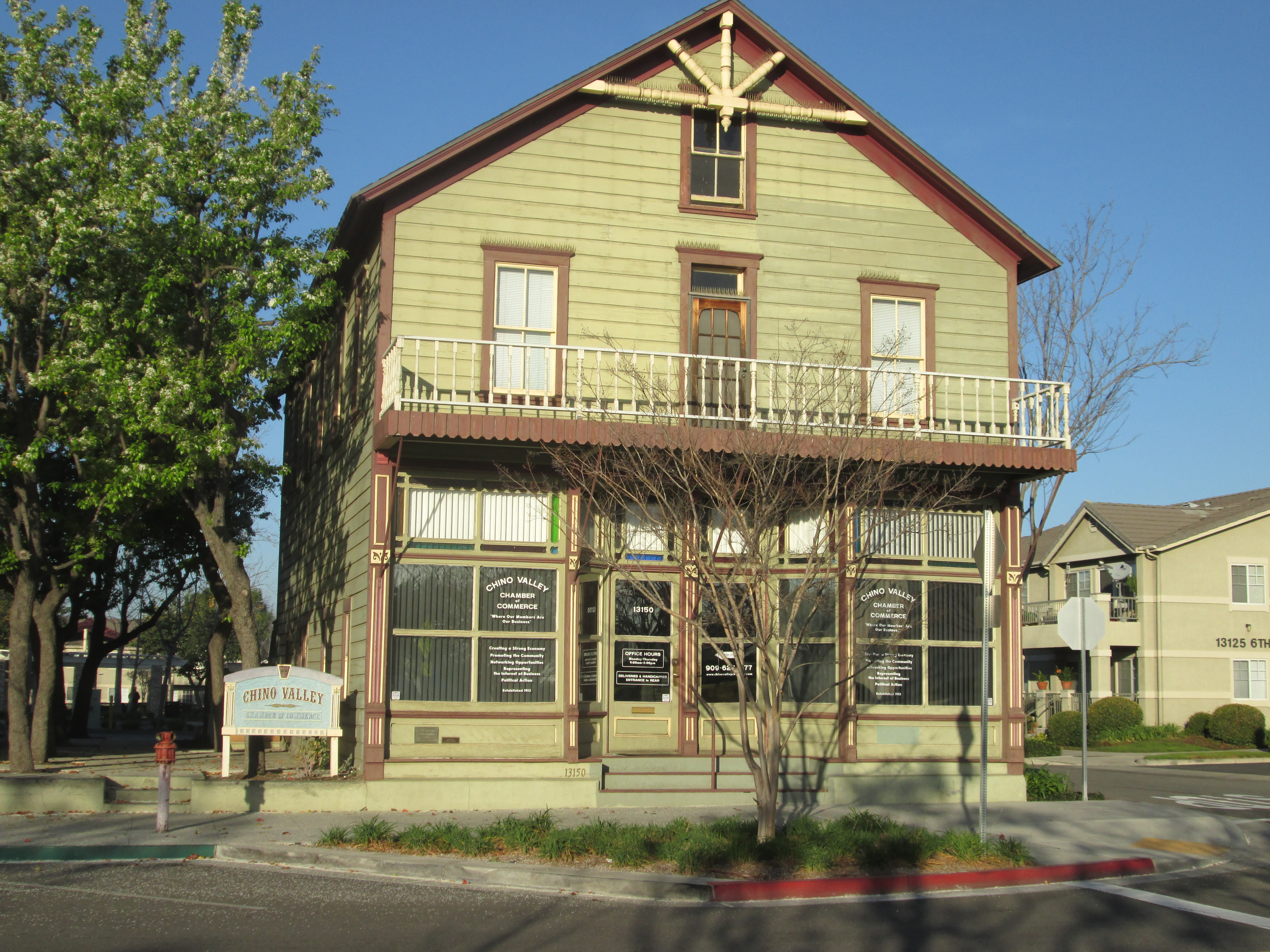

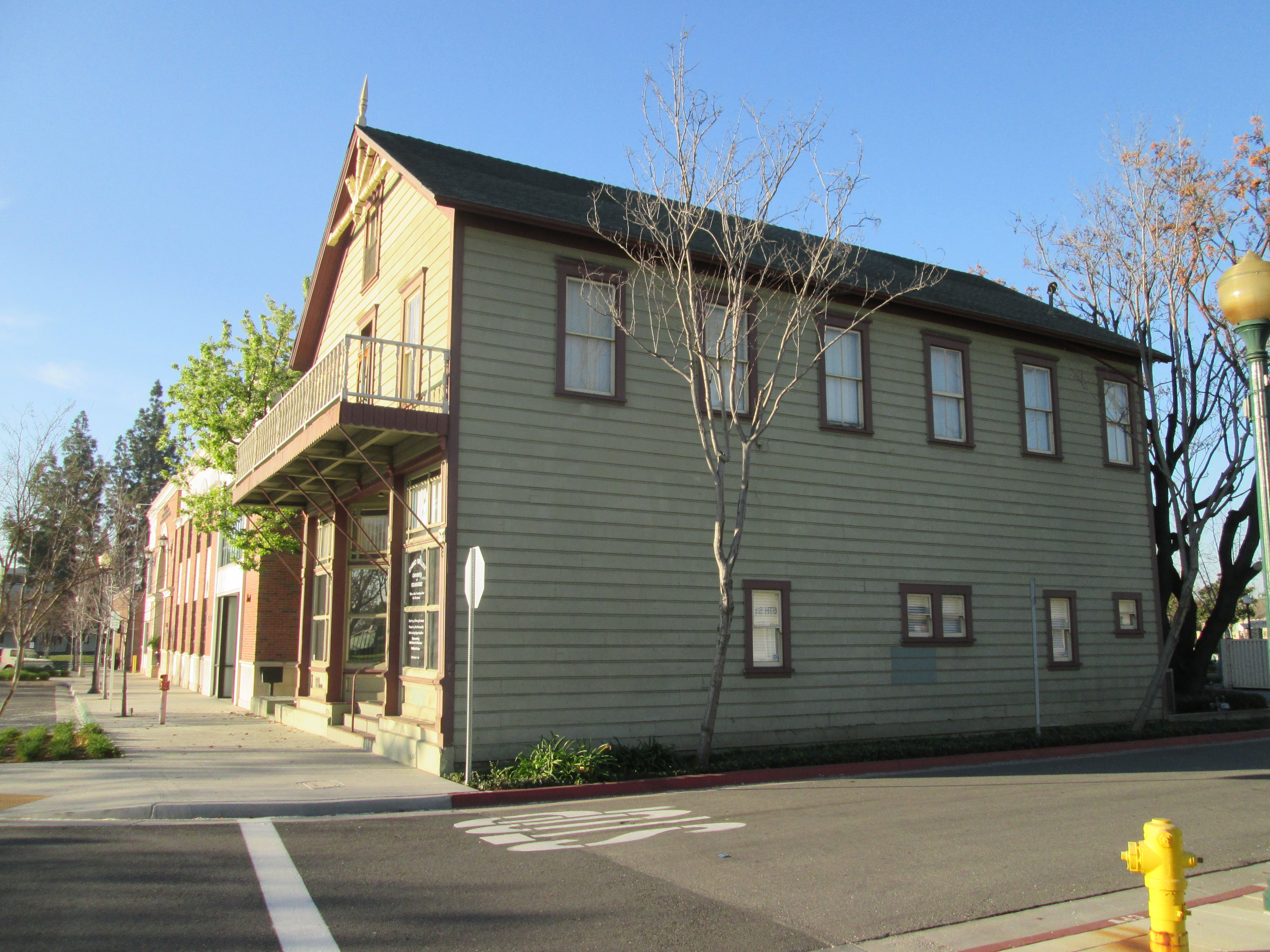

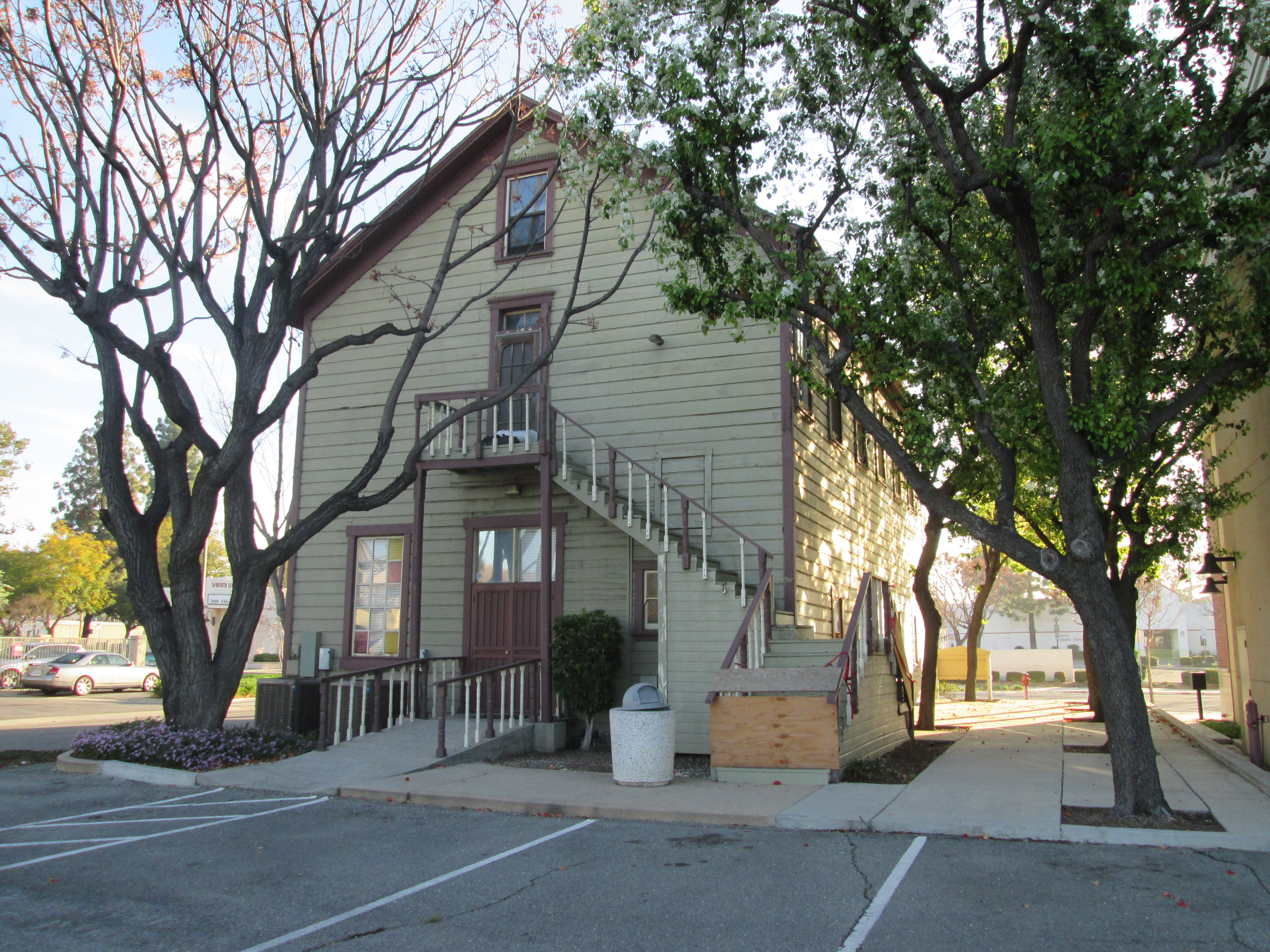
