= Luis Zendejas =

Mexican gridiron football player (born 1961)

No. 6, 8
- Position: Placekicker

Personal information
- Born: October 22, 1961 (age 65); Curimeo, Michoacan, Mexico
- Listed height: 5 ft 9 in (1.75 m)
- Listed weight: 175 lb (79 kg)

Career information
- High school: Don Antonio Lugo (Chino, California, U.S.)
- College: Arizona State
- NFL draft: 1985: undrafted

Career history
- Arizona Outlaws (1985); Atlanta Falcons (1985)*; Minnesota Vikings (1986)*; Dallas Cowboys (1987–1988); Philadelphia Eagles (1988–1989); Dallas Cowboys (1989); Arizona Rattlers (1992–1995); Birmingham Barracudas (1995)
- * Offseason or practice squad member only

Awards and highlights
- ArenaBowl champion (1994); AFL All-Star (1993); AFL Second-team 15th Anniversary Team (2001); Consensus All-American (1983); First-team All-Pac-10 (1983); 3× Second-team All-Pac-10 (1981, 1982, 1984)

Career NFL statistics
- Games played: 31
- Field goals: 37
- Field goal attempts: 55
- Field goal %: 67.3
- Longest field goal: 50
- Stats at Pro Football Reference

Career AFL statistics
- Games played: 37
- Field goals: 47
- Field goal attempts: 100
- Field goal %: 47.0
- Stats at ArenaFan.com

Luis Fernando Zendejas (born October 22, 1961) is a Mexican former player of American football who was a placekicker in the National Football League (NFL) for the Minnesota Vikings, Philadelphia Eagles and Dallas Cowboys. He also was a member of the Arena Football League (AFL). He later played professionally in the United States Football League (USFL), and Canadian Football League (CFL). He played college football for the Arizona State Sun Devils.

== Early life ==
Zendejas, was born in Curimeo, Michoacan, Mexico as one of nine children to Joaquin, and Raquel Zendejas. His parents moved the family to Chino, California when he was eight years old. In moving from Michoacan, he would be joining his uncle, Genaro's family, which included his cousins, and future place kickers Tony Zendejas and Martin Zendejas. Genaro Zendejas had just migrated his family to Chino, California from Curimeo, Michoacan, Mexico. Soccer was the main sport in the Zendejas family.

He attended Don Antonio Lugo High School, where he was initially a midfielder with the soccer team. He was called "Z" by his teammates. Football head coach Jack Coppes asked him to try out for the team and he ended up playing both sports. As a freshman, he converted 5 field goals and 19 extra point attempts. As a sophomore, he tied his cousin Tony, for the second longest field goal (53 yards) in CIF history.

As a senior, he became the school's first four-year varsity letterman, while helping to win its first California Interscholastic Federation football title. He received All-CIF honors at the end of the season.

== College career ==
Zendejas accepted a football scholarship from Arizona State University. He became a starter at place kicker as a freshman.

As a junior in 1983, he made a school record 28 field goals for 112 points, receiving first-team All-Pac-10 and consensus first-team All-American honors. As a senior in 1984, he slumped early in the season, but recovered to earn second-team All-Pac-10 honors.

He finished his college career making 81 out of 108 field goals (75%) and 137 out of 138 extra points (99.3%). He set the then-NCAA Division I career scoring record of 368 points, and most of the school's kicking records.

In 1995, he was inducted into the Arizona State University Sports Hall of Fame.

== Professional career ==
=== Arizona Outlaws ===
Zendejas was selected in the 1985 USFL Territorial Draft by the Arizona Outlaws of the United States Football League. On January 23, 1985, he was signed to a contract. He made 72% (24–33) of his field goals and 87% (36–41) of his extra points as a rookie. In 1986, the team folded along with the rest of the league.

=== Minnesota Vikings ===
In 1986, he was signed by the Minnesota Vikings, who were looking for a replacement for the recently retired Jan Stenerud. On August 21, he was released after losing the kicking competition against Chuck Nelson.

=== Dallas Cowboys (first stint) ===
In 1987, he was signed by the Dallas Cowboys, who were looking for a replacement for Rafael Septién. On September 1, he was waived after losing the kicking competition to Roger Ruzek. After the players went on a strike on the third week of the season, those contests were canceled (reducing the 16-game season to 15) and the NFL decided that the games would be played with replacement players. In September, he was re-signed to be a part of the Cowboys replacement team, which was given the mock name "Rhinestone Cowboys" by the media. He played in two games, where he made 3 out of 4 field goals and all 10 extra point attempts, including a team season-long 50-yard field goal against the Philadelphia Eagles. He was replaced with Kerry Brady in the game against the Washington Redskins. On October 27, he was placed on the injured reserve list with an ankle injury. He was released 3 weeks later.

On July 22, 1988, he was re-signed by the Cowboys who wanted protect themselves in case Ruzek's contract holdout extended into the regular season. Zendejas, who made a 47-yard field goal but missed two 49-yarders in the preseason, was released when Ruzek rejoined the team on September 13.

=== Philadelphia Eagles ===
On September 27, 1988, he was signed by the Philadelphia Eagles after Dean Dorsey and Dale Dawson struggled in the first four games of the year. In the twelfth game against the New York Giants, he had a field goal blocked with 8:50 left in overtime, that was returned by teammate Clyde Simmons for a 15-yard game winning touchdown. He was a part of the playoff game against the Chicago Bears famously known as the "Fog Bowl", where he made all of the Eagles' points (4 field goals) in the 12–20 loss.

In 1989, he made four field goals against the San Francisco 49ers. On October 30, he was released after he missed four of seven field-goal attempts, including a 41-yarder in the Eagles' 28–24 win against the Denver Broncos. Steve DeLine was signed to take his place.

=== Dallas Cowboys (second stint) ===
On November 7, 1989, he was signed by the Dallas Cowboys to replace a struggling Ruzek. On November 22, Cowboys head coach Jimmy Johnson alleged that Eagles head coach Buddy Ryan had taken out a "bounty" on two Cowboys players—then-current Dallas (and former Philadelphia) placekicker Zendejas and quarterback Troy Aikman in a game dubbed "Bounty Bowl" played on Thanksgiving Day at Texas Stadium. Zendejas was targeted by linebacker Jessie Small on the second-half kickoff, where Zendejas was penalized on the play for a low block. He later reported to the media that he taped a telephone conversation with Eagles special teams coach Al Roberts without telling Roberts that would prove the accusation. After a two-week investigation, the league office issued a statement that they found the Eagles innocent of all charges.

Zendejas was released on August 26, 1990, after losing a kicking competition against Ken Willis.

=== Arizona Rattlers ===
He also played for the Arena Football League's Arizona Rattlers from 1992 to 1995. He was a part of the ArenaBowl VIII championship team in 1994. He is the only kicker in Rattlers history to drop-kick extra points for two points.

=== Birmingham Barracudas ===
Zendejas finished his career with the Birmingham Barracudas of the Canadian Football League, where he kicked for 144 points in a single season in 1995.

== Personal life ==
Luis' brothers, Max and Joaquin, were also kickers in the NFL. His cousin Tony was a kicker in the NFL and Marty in the AFL. Zendejas has worked as senior director of community relations for the Arizona Cardinals since 2001. His son Cristian was the kicker for the Arizona State University football team.
