= Chino, California =

City in California, United States

- City
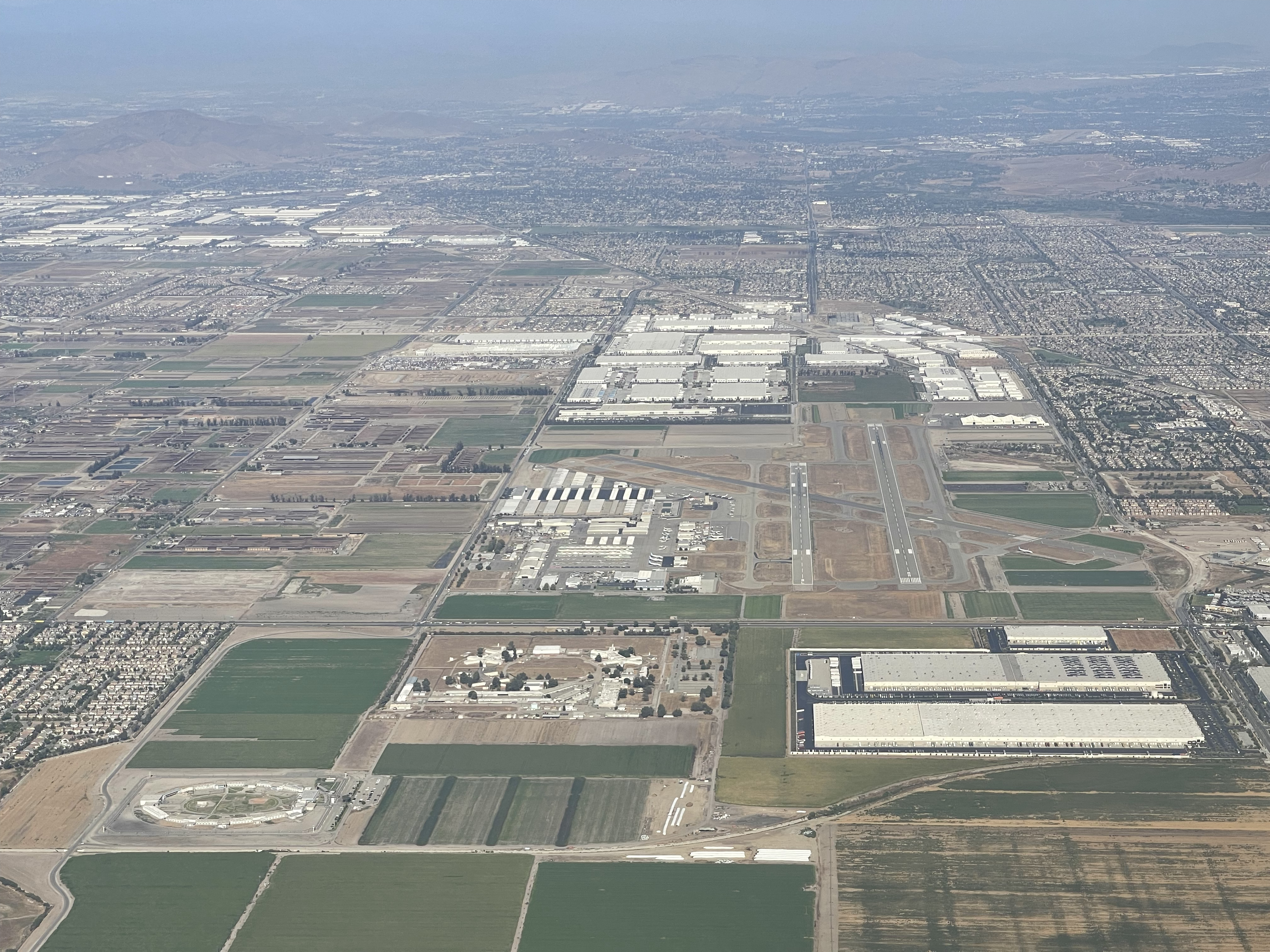
- Chino Airport in 2021

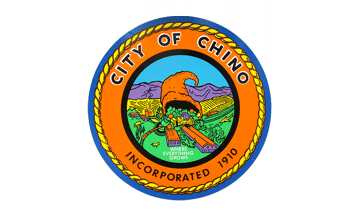
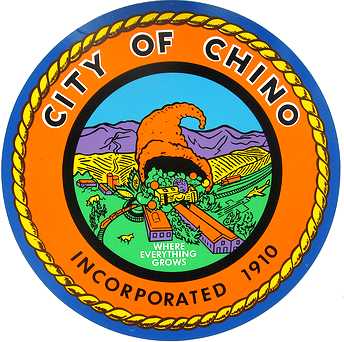
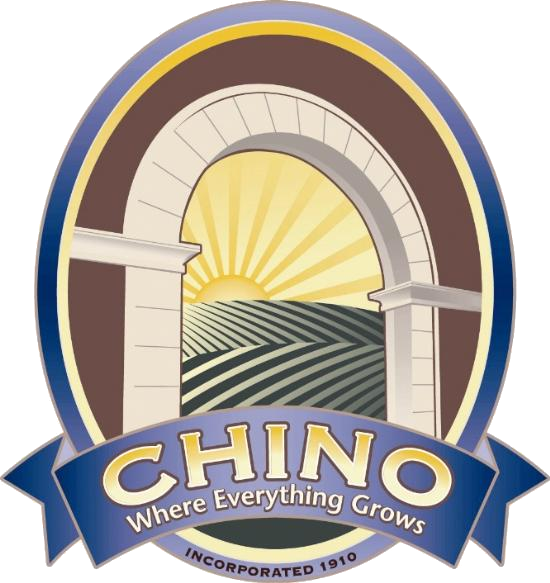
- Flag Seal
- Motto: "Where Everything Grows"
- Interactive map of Chino, California
- Location in Greater Los Angeles Location in California Location in the United States
- Coordinates: 34°1′4″N 117°41′24″W
- Country: United States
- State: California
- County: San Bernardino
- Incorporated: February 28, 1910
- Named for: Rancho Santa Ana del Chino

Government
  - Type: Council–manager
  - City council: Mayor Eunice M. Ulloa; Mayor Pro Tem Curtis Burton; Karen Comstock; Christopher Flores; Marc Lucio
  - City manager: Dr. Linda Reich

Area
  - Total: 29.70 sq mi (76.93 km^{2})
  - Land: 29.61 sq mi (76.68 km^{2})
  - Water: 0.097 sq mi (0.25 km^{2}) 0.04%
- Elevation: 728 ft (222 m)

Population (2020)
  - Total: 91,403
  - Estimate (2025): 96,957
  - Rank: 8th in San Bernardino County; 83rd in California
  - Density: 3,087.4/sq mi (1,192.05/km^{2})
- Time zone: UTC-8 (Pacific)
  - Summer (DST): UTC-7 (PDT)
- ZIP codes: 91708, 91710
- Area code: 909
- FIPS code: 06-13210
- GNIS feature IDs: 1660477, 2409453
- Website: www.cityofchino.org

Chino (/ˈtʃiːnoʊ/ CHEE-noh; Spanish for 'Curly') is a city in the western end of the Inland Empire region of San Bernardino County, California, United States, with Los Angeles County to its west and Orange County to its south in the Southern California region.

Chino's surroundings have long been a center of agriculture and dairy farming, providing milk products in Southern California and much of the southwestern United States. Chino's agricultural history dates back to the Spanish land grant forming Rancho Santa Ana del Chino. The area specialized in fruit orchards, row crops, and dairy.

Chino is bounded by Chino Hills and Los Angeles County to the west, Pomona to the northwest, unincorporated San Bernardino County (near Montclair) to the north, including the unincorporated community of Narod, Ontario to the northeast, Eastvale to the southeast in Riverside County and Orange County to the southwest. It is easily accessible via the Chino Valley (71) and Pomona (60) freeways. The population was 91,403 at the 2020 census.

== Etymology ==
The land grant on which the town was founded was called Rancho Santa Ana del Chino. Santa Ana is Spanish for Saint Anne, but the exact meaning of "Chino" has been explained in different ways. One explanation is that the "Chino" (curly-haired person or mixed-race person) was the chief of the local Native American village. The president of the Chino Valley Historical Society, drawing on Civil War-era letters, designates the "curl" referenced in the toponym as that at the top of the grama grass that abounded in the valley.

== History ==
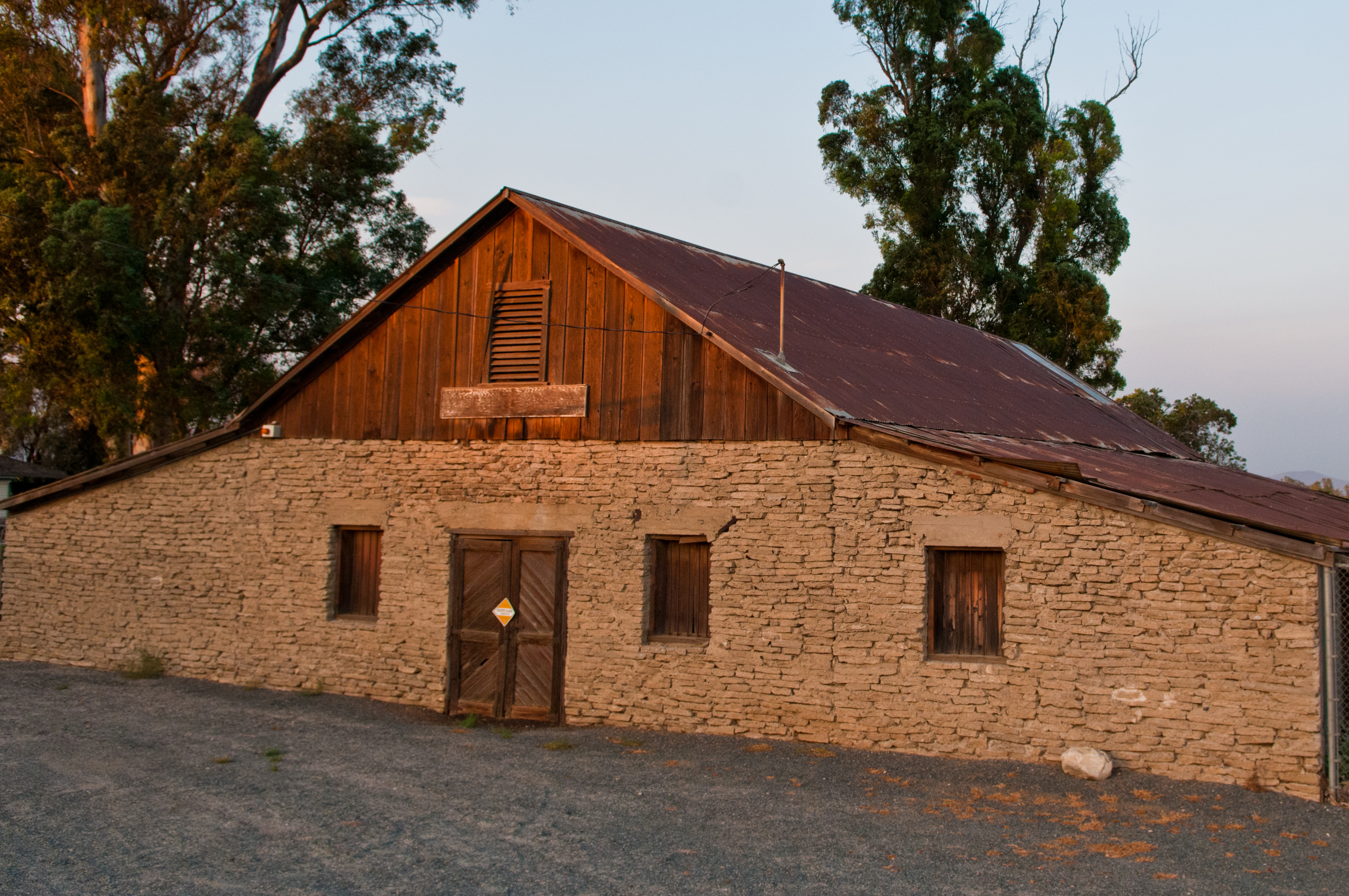
The Yorba–Slaughter Adobe, built in 1850 by Californio rancher Raimundo Yorba, is one of the oldest-standing buildings in San Bernardino County.

The Tongva had a settlement called Wapijangna in the Santa Ana River watershed. Some residents of Wapijanga were baptized at Mission San Gabriel, which was established in 1771. The Spanish crown claimed the land until Mexican independence was finalized and possession fell to the Mexican government.

Some twenty years later, Mexican governor of Alta California Juan Bautista Alvarado granted Rancho Santa Ana del Chino to Antonio Maria Lugo of the Lugo family. Two years later, his successor, Governor Micheltorena, granted an additional three leagues to Lugo's son-in-law Isaac Williams, who took charge of the rancho. Williams kept large quantities of horses and cattle, which attracted the envy of raiding Native Americans as well as unscrupulous whites. One of the latter was James Beckwourth, who, in 1840, posed as an otter hunter and stayed at Rancho Chino to determine the location of the area's animals, which he then reported to Walkara, the Ute mastermind of the raids.

Early in the Mexican–American War, the Battle of Chino took place at Williams' rancho. The battle ended prior to the arrival of the Mormon Battalion, dispatched on behalf of the United States, who instead labored in the rancho's agricultural harvest and constructed a grist mill.

During the California Gold Rush, the rancho was a popular stopover for travelers, and in the mining fury, coal was discovered there. In 1850, California was admitted to the union, and the process of separating privately held lands from the public domain began. The Williams claim to the Chino Rancho was patented in 1869.

Richard Gird was the next owner of the Rancho. Beginning in 1887, his land was subdivided and laid out. It became the "Town of Chino", and incorporated into a city in 1910. Sugar beets, corn, and alfalfa were raised there.

The Chino Valley, located at the foot of an alluvial plain with fertile topsoil reaching depths of 4 feet (1.2 m), was an agricultural mecca from the 1890s up through the mid-20th century. Sugar beets were a significant part of the economy in the early 1900s, followed by sweet corn (marketed as "Chino corn" throughout the Pacific coast area), peaches, walnuts, tomatoes, and strawberries. The city's official logo/crest features an overflowing cornucopia.

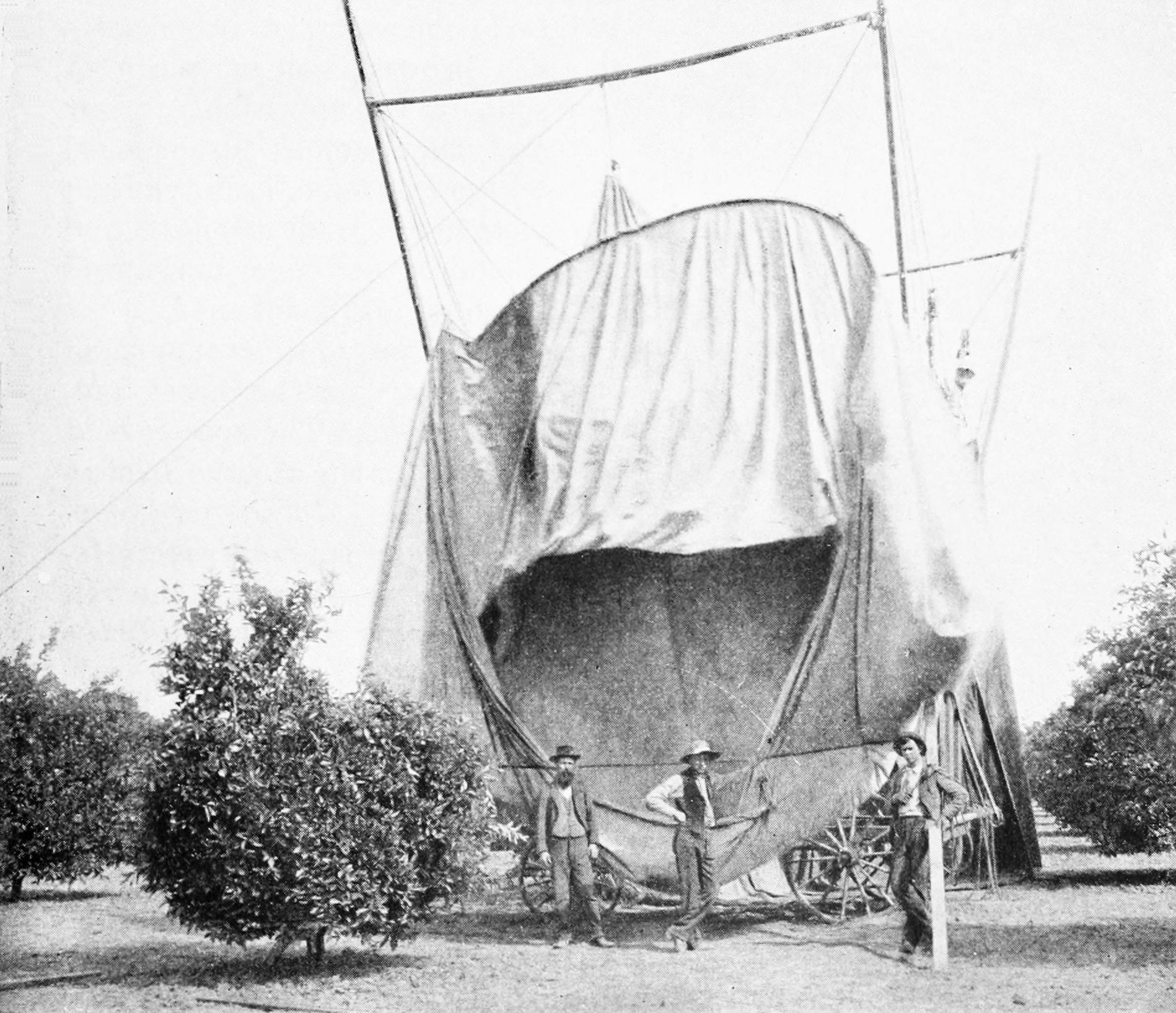
Fumigating tent for destroying California red scale in Chino Valley, c. 1893-94

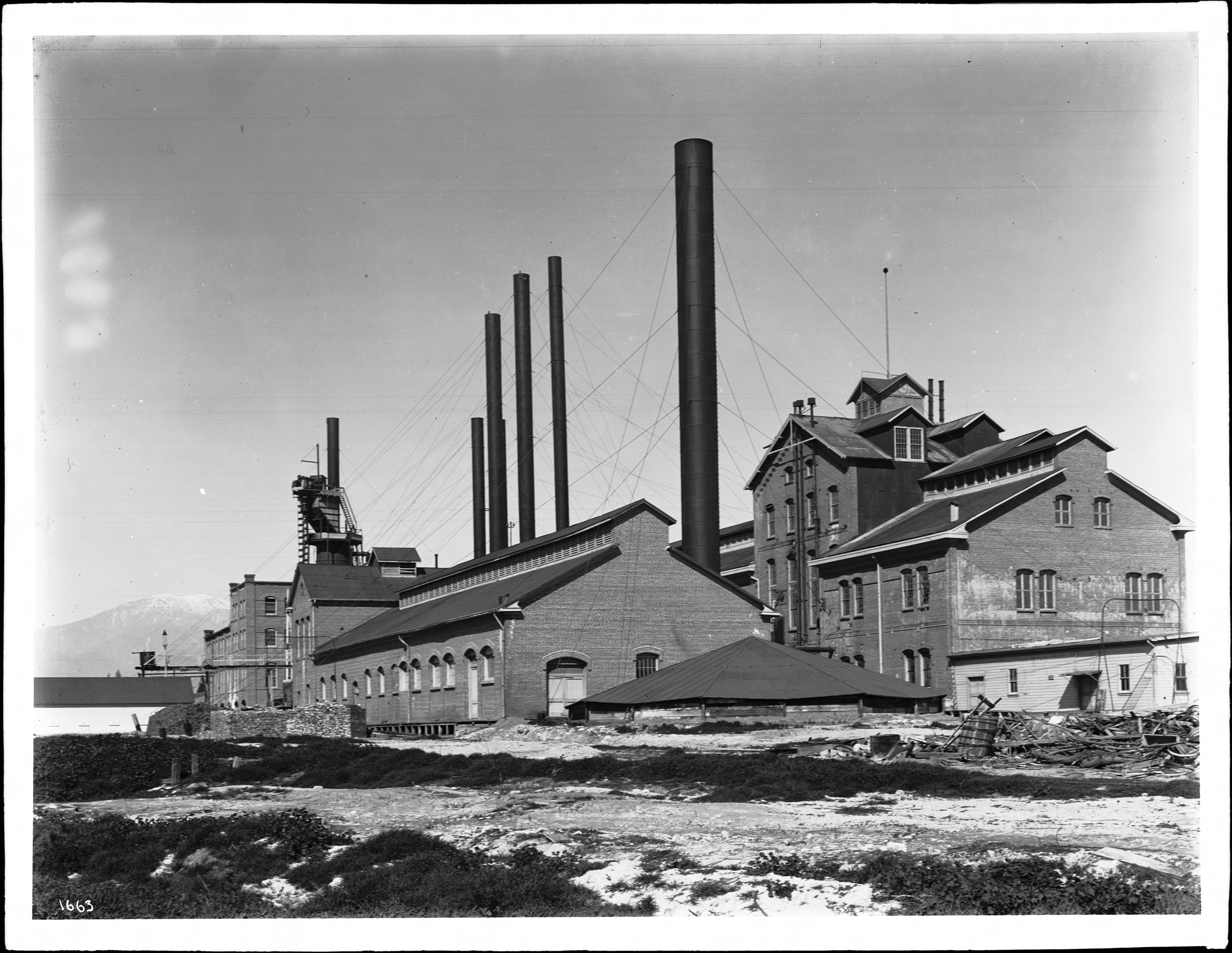
Beet sugar factory in the Chino Valley, with Mount San Antonio visible to the left, c. 1906

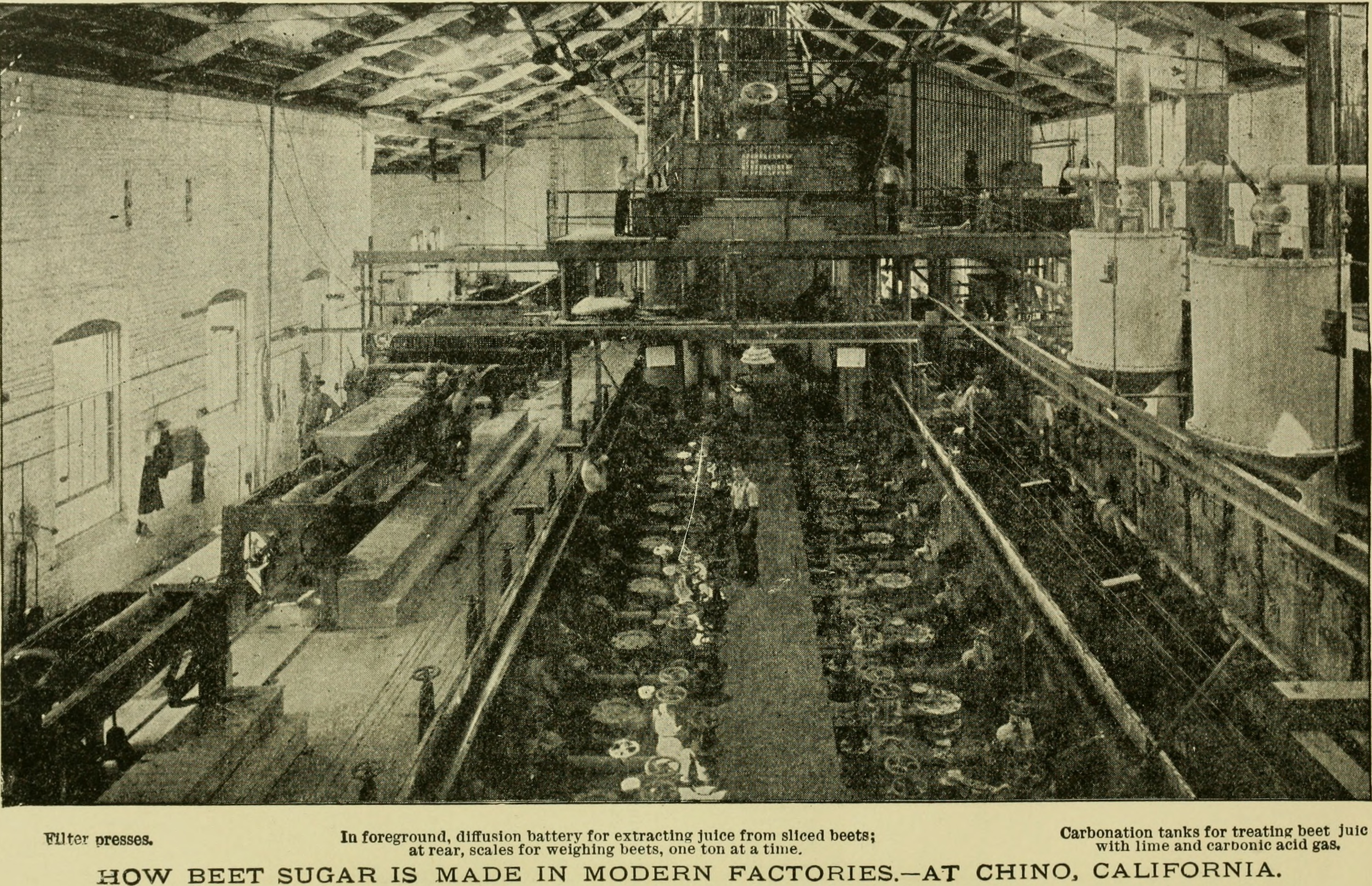
How beet sugar is made in modern factories -- at Chino, California, 1915

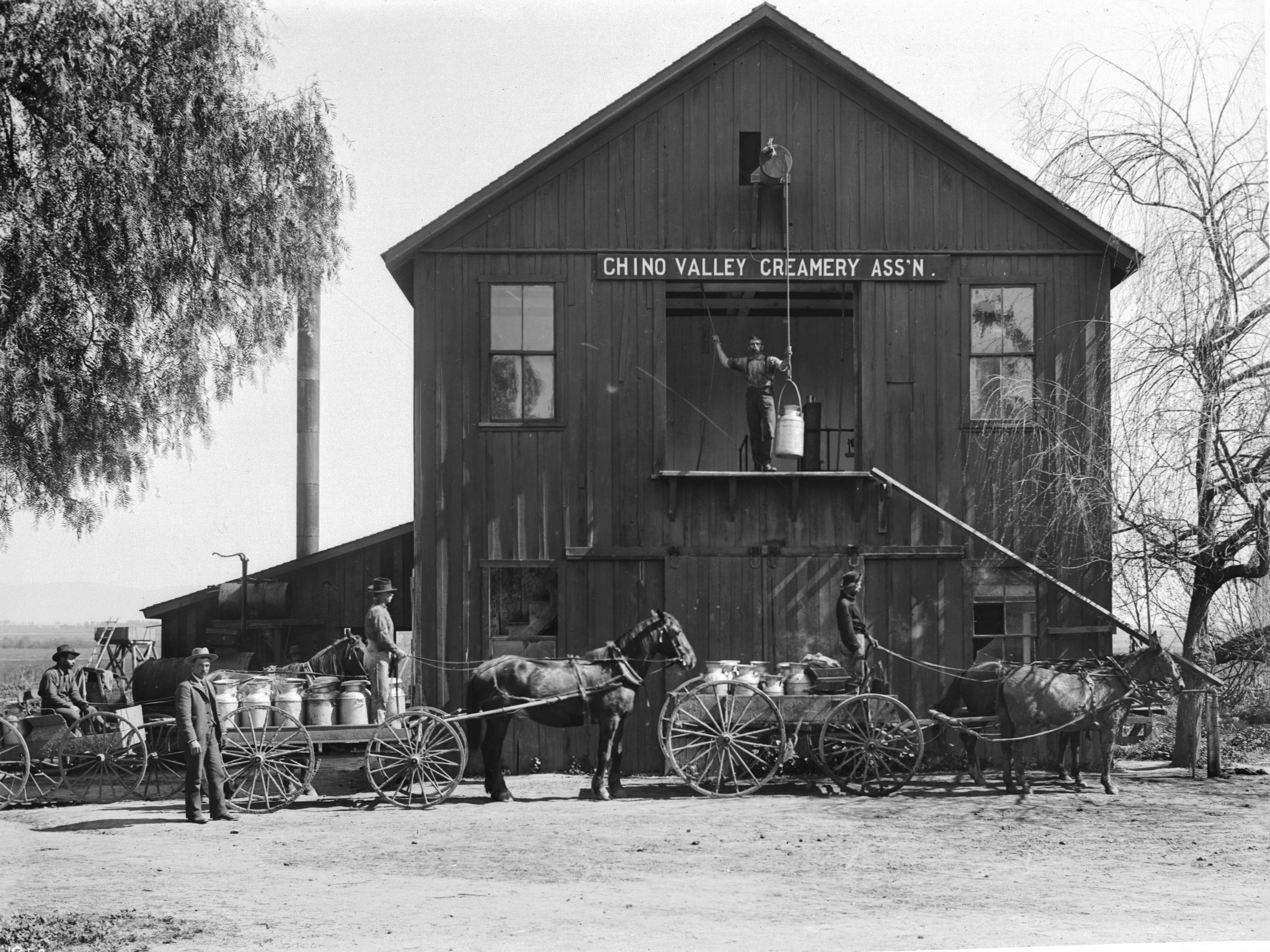
Chino Valley Creamery, c. 1900

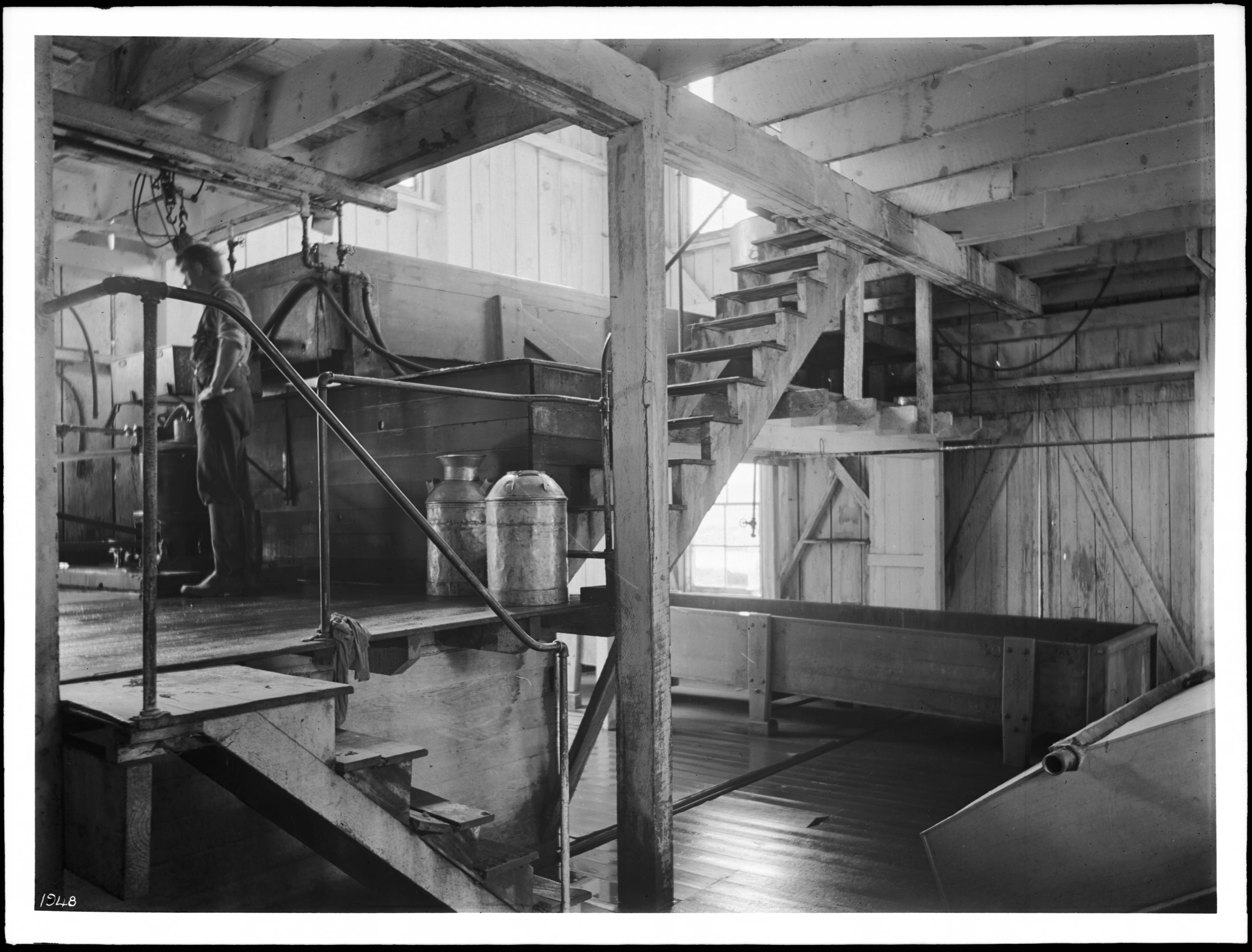
Interior of a Chino Valley creamery, c. 1900

The dairy industry flourished from the 1950s through the 1980s, with dairy-friendly zoning in the southwest corner of San Bernardino County encouraging many ethnic Dutch families to locate there and become the cornerstone of the industry. Chino's large, highly efficient dairies made it the largest milk-producing community in the nation's largest milk-producing state.

Because of its pastoral setting and rural flavor, Chino was a popular site for Hollywood crews to shoot "Midwestern" settings. 1960s movies included Bus Riley's Back in Town starring Ann-Margret and Michael Parks; The Stripper, with Joanne Woodward; and the mid-1960s TV series Twelve O'Clock High, refashioning Chino's rural airport into a British airfield with quonset huts among farm fields.

In the 1970s, Chino developed into a small suburban city, forming the western anchor of the Inland Empire region, and now the city's development has gradually taken on a more middle-class character. There are still many industrial areas as well as farm animals such as goats and chickens. According to the 2004 FBI UCR, the city had about 3.6 violent crimes per 1,000 population, which is typical for an American suburb, and its property crime below average.

On July 11, 2017, in a special election, Chino voters voted against Measure H, which would have allowed 30 acres (12 ha) of rural land located near Ontario to be used to build a total of 180 new homes by home builder D.R. Horton. The measure faced considerable opposition from city residents, despite support from the Chino Chamber of Commerce and school district.

== Economy ==
=== Top employers ===
According to the city's 2011 Comprehensive Annual Financial Report, the top employers in the city are:

#	Employer	# of employees
1	Chino Valley Unified School District	Over 1,000
2	California Institution for Men	Over 1,000
3	California Institution for Women	500–1,000
4	Chino Valley Medical Center	500–1,000
5	Wal-Mart	fewer than 500
6	Hussmann	fewer than 500
7	Best Buy	fewer than 500
8	Nature's Best	fewer than 500
9	Mission Linen Supply	fewer than 500
10	Target	fewer than 500
11	Omnia Furniture	fewer than 500
12	AEP Industries	fewer than 500
13	J. C. Penney	fewer than 500
14	Farmers Insurance Group	fewer than 500
15	ClosetMaid	fewer than 500

According to the city's 2025 Comprehensive Annual Financial Report there are four employers in Chino with over 1000 employees:

- Chino Valley Unified School District
- Walmart Fulfillment Center
- FedEx Ground Package Systems Inc. (Flight Avenue)
- California Institution for Men

Two California state prisons for adults (California Institution for Men and California Institution for Women), as well as the Heman G. Stark Youth Correctional Facility, lie within the city limits.

== Education ==
Chino is a part of the Chino Valley Unified School District.

=== Elementary schools ===
Chino has had 11 elementary schools:

- El Rancho Elementary (closed in 2008–2009 school year)
- Alicia Cortez Elementary
- Newman Elementary
- E.J. Marshall Elementary
- Dickson Elementary
- Anna Borba Fundamental
- Howard Cattle Elementary
- Richard Gird Elementary (closed in 2008–2009 school year)
- Edwin Rhodes Elementary
- Walnut Avenue Elementary
- Liberty Elementary

=== Junior high schools ===
Chino has four junior high schools:

- Briggs Junior High School
- Ramona Junior High School
- Magnolia Junior High School
- Woodcrest Junior High School

=== High schools ===
Chino has three high schools:

- Don Antonio Lugo High School
- Buena Vista High School
- Chino High School

=== Charter schools ===
Chino has one charter school:

- Oxford Preparatory Academy (Closed)
- Allegiance STEAM Academy

=== K-8 schools ===
Chino has three K-8 schools:

- Lyle S. Briggs Fundamental School
- Cal Aero Preserve Academy
- Legacy Academy

Chino is serviced by a satellite center of Chaffey College, a community college.

== Geography ==
According to the United States Census Bureau, the city has a total area of 29.7 square miles (77 km^{2}). 29.6 square miles (77 km^{2}) of it is land and 0.04% is water.

- Chino is a suburb in San Bernardino County, located 33 miles (53 km) from the county seat, San Bernardino.
- Los Angeles, 35 miles (56 km)
- Riverside, 26 miles (42 km)
- Santa Ana, 29 miles (47 km)
- Anaheim, 24 miles (39 km)

=== Climate ===
According to the Köppen Climate Classification system, Chino has a hot-summer Mediterranean climate, abbreviated "Csa" on climate maps. Chino has long, hot summers with cool to mild mornings and short, mild, and wet winters with chilly mornings usually in the 40s. Precipitation peaks during the month of February.

Climate data for Chino, California, 1991–2020 normals, extremes 1998–present
Month	Jan	Feb	Mar	Apr	May	Jun	Jul	Aug	Sep	Oct	Nov	Dec	Year
Record high °F (°C)	93 (34)	95 (35)	97 (36)	106 (41)	104 (40)	115 (46)	120 (49)	115 (46)	121 (49)	111 (44)	100 (38)	92 (33)	121 (49)
Mean maximum °F (°C)	83.1 (28.4)	84.1 (28.9)	88.9 (31.6)	95.1 (35.1)	96.9 (36.1)	102.8 (39.3)	105.9 (41.1)	107.6 (42.0)	108.3 (42.4)	100.9 (38.3)	93.7 (34.3)	82.9 (28.3)	111.7 (44.3)
Mean daily maximum °F (°C)	69.5 (20.8)	69.8 (21.0)	72.5 (22.5)	77.0 (25.0)	81.1 (27.3)	87.6 (30.9)	93.7 (34.3)	96.3 (35.7)	92.7 (33.7)	84.5 (29.2)	76.3 (24.6)	68.7 (20.4)	80.8 (27.1)
Daily mean °F (°C)	55.6 (13.1)	56.4 (13.6)	59.1 (15.1)	62.8 (17.1)	67.7 (19.8)	73.0 (22.8)	78.3 (25.7)	79.8 (26.6)	76.5 (24.7)	68.9 (20.5)	60.7 (15.9)	54.6 (12.6)	66.1 (19.0)
Mean daily minimum °F (°C)	41.7 (5.4)	42.9 (6.1)	45.8 (7.7)	48.7 (9.3)	54.3 (12.4)	58.5 (14.7)	62.9 (17.2)	63.2 (17.3)	60.4 (15.8)	53.3 (11.8)	45.1 (7.3)	40.4 (4.7)	51.4 (10.8)
Mean minimum °F (°C)	30.2 (−1.0)	31.8 (−0.1)	35.6 (2.0)	39.1 (3.9)	45.7 (7.6)	51.3 (10.7)	56.1 (13.4)	56.1 (13.4)	51.5 (10.8)	43.2 (6.2)	35.1 (1.7)	29.7 (−1.3)	28.0 (−2.2)
Record low °F (°C)	20 (−7)	27 (−3)	28 (−2)	31 (−1)	39 (4)	45 (7)	50 (10)	51 (11)	47 (8)	33 (1)	27 (−3)	23 (−5)	20 (−7)
Average precipitation inches (mm)	2.17 (55)	2.68 (68)	1.43 (36)	0.55 (14)	0.17 (4.3)	0.02 (0.51)	0.08 (2.0)	0.01 (0.25)	0.06 (1.5)	0.53 (13)	0.59 (15)	1.69 (43)	9.98 (252.56)
Average precipitation days (≥ 0.01 in)	4.8	6.2	4.7	3.6	1.4	0.3	0.3	0.2	0.7	3.0	4.4	4.9	34.5
Source 1: NOAA
Source 2: National Weather Service (mean maxima/minima 2006–2020)

== Demographics ==
Historical population
Census	Pop.	Note	%±
1930	3,118		—
1940	4,204		34.8%
1950	5,784		37.6%
1960	10,305		78.2%
1970	20,411		98.1%
1980	40,165		96.8%
1990	59,682		48.6%
2000	67,168		12.5%
2010	77,983		16.1%
2020	91,403		17.2%
U.S. Decennial Census

=== Racial and ethnic composition ===
Chino, California – Racial and ethnic composition Note: the US Census treats Hispanic/Latino as an ethnic category. This table excludes Latinos from the racial categories and assigns them to a separate category. Hispanics/Latinos may be of any race.
Race / Ethnicity (NH = Non-Hispanic)	Pop 1990	Pop 2000	Pop 2010	Pop 2020	% 1990	% 2000	% 2010	% 2020
White alone (NH)	31,291	25,267	21,659	18,833	52.43%	37.62%	27.77%	20.60%
Black or African American alone (NH)	4,560	5,100	4,529	5,212	7.64%	7.59%	5.81%	5.70%
Native American or Alaska Native alone (NH)	170	232	256	256	0.28%	0.35%	0.33%	0.28%
Asian alone (NH)	1,883	3,242	7,932	17,255	3.16%	4.83%	10.17%	18.88%
Native Hawaiian or Pacific Islander alone (NH)	1,883	106	112	102	3.16%	0.16%	0.14%	0.11%
Other race alone (NH)	190	113	210	466	0.31%	0.17%	0.27%	0.51%
Mixed race or Multiracial (NH)	190	1,278	1,292	2,438	0.31%	1.90%	1.66%	2.67%
Hispanic or Latino (any race)	21,588	31,830	41,993	46,841	36.17%	47.39%	53.85%	51.25%
Total	59,682	67,168	77,983	91,403	100.00%	100.00%	100.00%	100.00%

=== 2020 census ===
As of the 2020 census, Chino had a population of 91,403. The population density was 3,087.4 inhabitants per square mile (1,192.1/km^{2}). The median age was 37.2 years. The age distribution was 22.4% under the age of 18, 9.2% aged 18 to 24, 29.7% aged 25 to 44, 25.9% aged 45 to 64, and 12.8% aged 65 or older. For every 100 females, there were 99.9 males, and for every 100 females age 18 and over, there were 98.3 males age 18 and over.

The census reported that 94.0% of the population lived in households, 0.2% lived in non-institutionalized group quarters, and 5.7% were institutionalized. In addition, 99.9% of residents lived in urban areas, while 0.1% lived in rural areas.

There were 26,351 households, of which 41.9% had children under the age of 18 living in them. Of all households, 55.8% were married-couple households, 6.1% were cohabiting-couple households, 14.1% had a male householder with no spouse or partner present, and 24.0% had a female householder with no spouse or partner present. About 14.3% of households were one person, and 6.0% had someone living alone who was 65 years of age or older. The average household size was 3.26. There were 21,194 families (80.4% of all households).

There were 27,224 housing units at an average density of 920.5 units per square mile (355.4 units/km^{2}). Of these, 26,351 (96.8%) were occupied and 3.2% were vacant. Of occupied units, 62.5% were owner-occupied and 37.5% were occupied by renters. The homeowner vacancy rate was 0.7% and the rental vacancy rate was 4.5%.

=== 2023 estimate ===
In 2023, the US Census Bureau estimated that the median household income was $103,845, and the per capita income was $36,118. About 6.4% of families and 7.4% of the population were below the poverty line.

=== 2010 census ===
At the 2010 census Chino had a population of 77,983. The population density was 2,629.9 inhabitants per square mile (1,015.4/km^{2}). The racial makeup of Chino was 43,981 (56.4%) White (27.8% Non-Hispanic White), 4,829 (6.2%) African American, 786 (1.0%) Native American, 8,159 (10.5%) Asian, 168 (0.2%) Pacific Islander, 16,503 (21.2%) from other races, and 3,557 (4.6%) from two or more races. Hispanic or Latino people of any race were 41,993 persons (53.8%).

The census reported that 70,919 people (90.9% of the population) lived in households, 164 (0.2%) lived in non-institutionalized group quarters, and 6,900 (8.8%) were institutionalized.

There were 20,772 households, 9,979 (48.0%) had children under the age of 18 living in them, 12,426 (59.8%) were married couples living together, 3,041 (14.6%) had a female householder with no husband present, 1,469 (7.1%) had a male householder with no wife present. There were 1,185 (5.7%) households of unmarried couples; of which 147 (0.7%) were same-sex. 2,840 households (13.7%) were one person and 1,020 (4.9%) had someone living alone who was 65 or older. The average household size was 3.41. There were 16,936 families (81.5% of households); the average family size was 3.72.

The age distribution was 19,737 people (25.3%) under the age of 18, 8,530 people (10.9%) aged 18 to 24, 25,091 people (32.2%) aged 25 to 44, 18,954 people (24.3%) aged 45 to 64, and 5,671 people (7.3%) who were 65 or older. The median age was 33.2 years. For every 100 females, there were 105.7 males. For every 100 females age 18 and over, there were 105.2 males.

There were 21,797 housing units at an average density of 735.1 per square mile, of the occupied units 14,315 (68.9%) were owner-occupied and 6,457 (31.1%) were rented. The homeowner vacancy rate was 2.1%; the rental vacancy rate was 6.4%. 49,280 people (63.2% of the population) lived in owner-occupied housing units and 21,639 people (27.7%) lived in rental housing units.

According to the 2010 United States Census, Chino had a median household income of $71,671, with 9.6% of the population living below the federal poverty line.

== Government ==
The city is governed by a five-member council consisting of a mayor plus four councilmembers. The mayor is elected at-large and council members are elected by district; all serve four-year terms. The city manager and city attorney are appointed by the council. The city's elections, which are plurality, are held on a Tuesday after the first Monday in November of even-numbered years.

=== Federal and state representation ===
Chino is included in the 35th congressional district, which is represented by Norma Torres (D–Pomona).

In the California State Legislature, Burbank is in the 22nd senatorial district, represented by Democrat Susan Rubio, and is divided between the 53rd Assembly district, represented by Democrat Michelle Rodriguez, and the 59th Assembly district, represented by Republican Phillip Chen.

== Transportation ==
The Chino Transit Center is located at 6th and Chino Avenue. From there, the #85 and #88 Omnitrans buses connect northbound to the Montclair Transit Center, where many daily Metrolink, Foothill Transit, and Omnitrans connections are available to downtown Los Angeles and points in between.

== Notable people ==
- Echosmith, American indie pop band
- Brent Billingsley, MLB player
- Chris McFoy, NFL player
- Diana Taurasi, WNBA player
- Esera Tuaolo, NFL player
- Geoff Blum, MLB player
- George Uko, NFL player
- Greg Salas, NFL player
- Jarron Gilbert, NFL player
- Joaquin Zendejas, NFL player
- Luis Zendejas, NFL player
- Mark Vander Poel, NFL player
- Max Zendejas, NFL player
- Paul Crowe, NFL player
- R.J. Stanford, NFL player
- Sedrick Ellis, NFL player
- Shelly Martinez, WWE wrestler
- Tony Zendejas, NFL player

== Local attractions ==
The Planes of Fame and Yanks Air Museum are air museums located at Chino Airport.

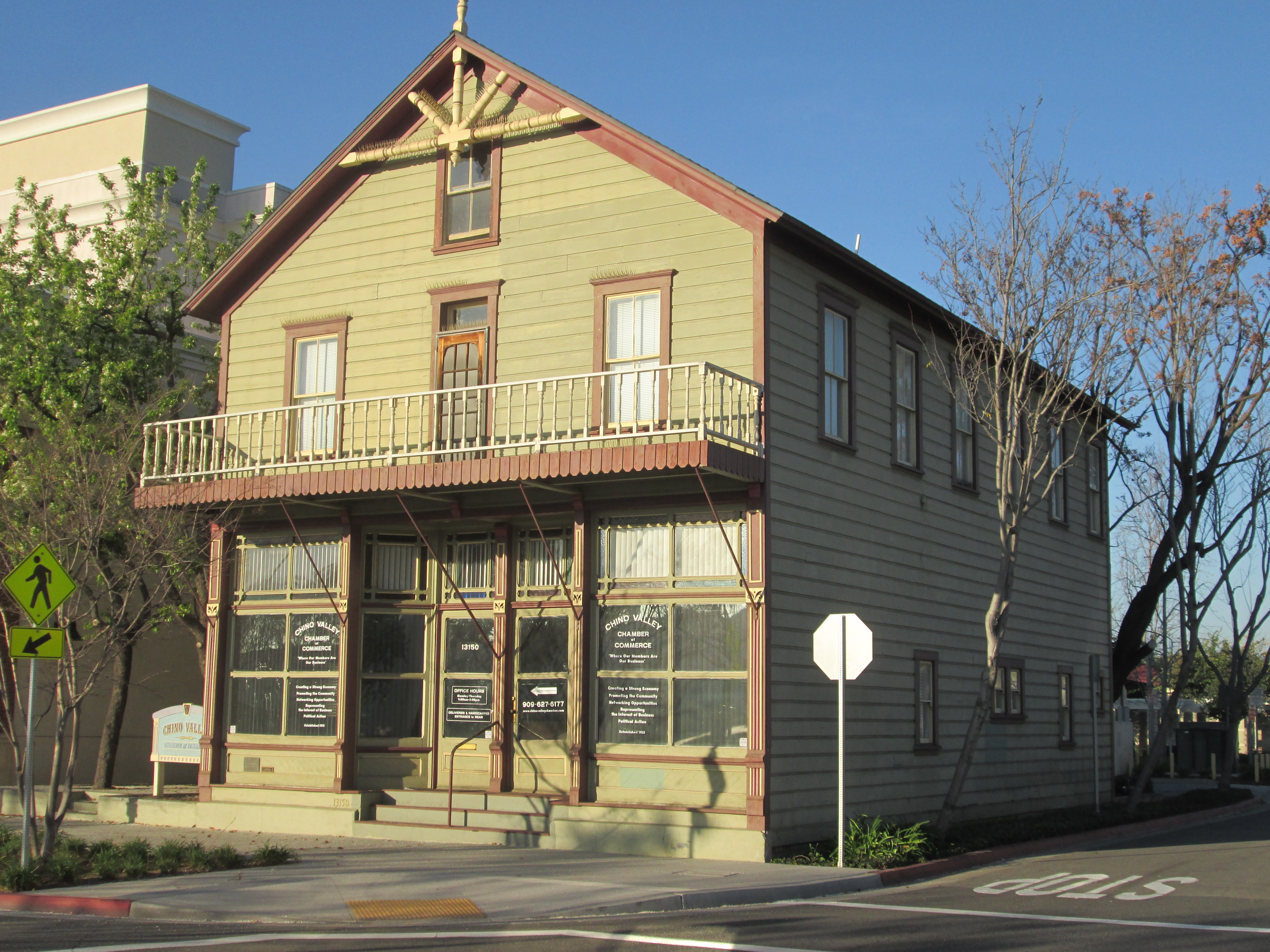
Moyse Building

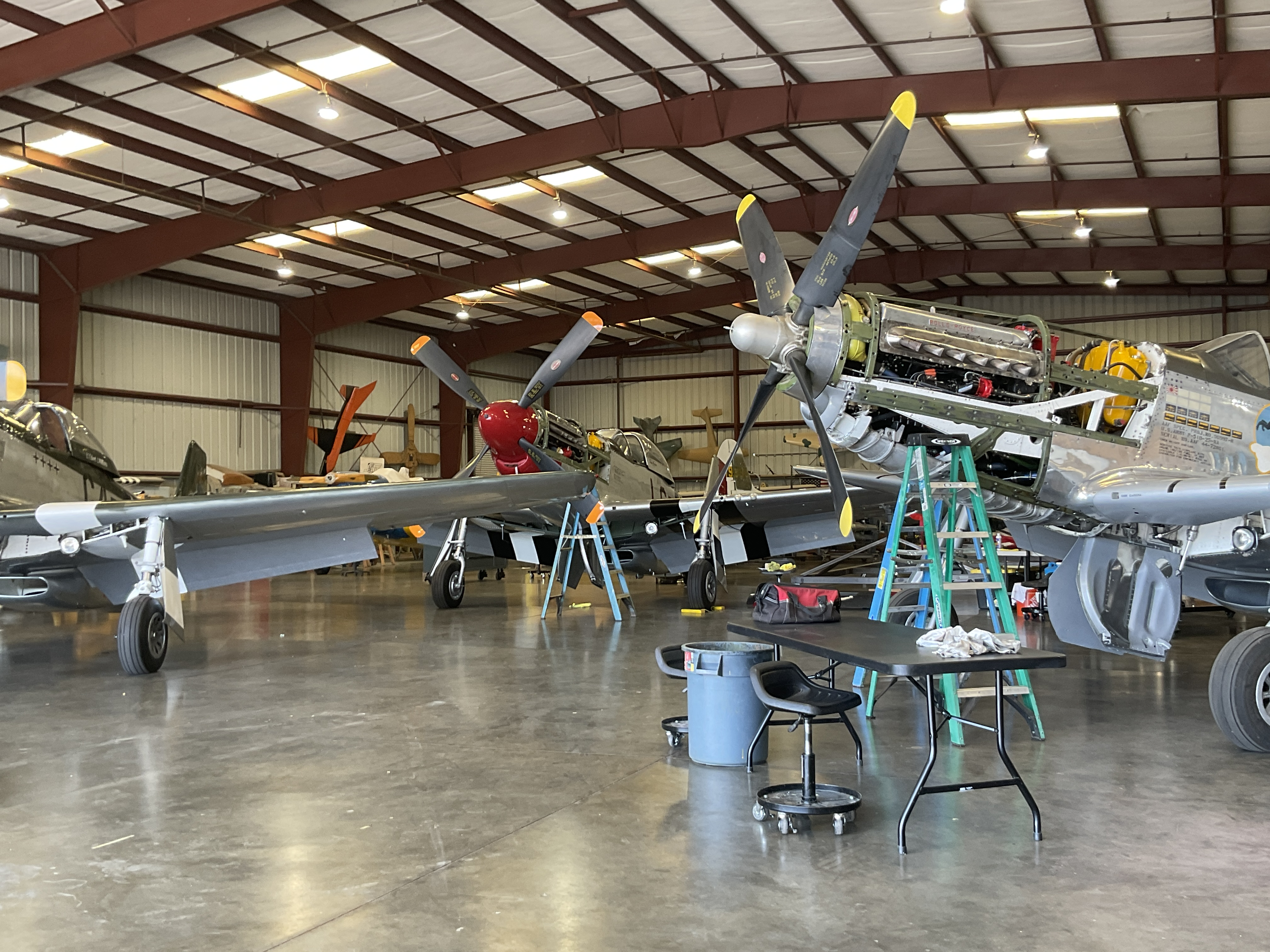
P-51 Mustangs at Chino Airport

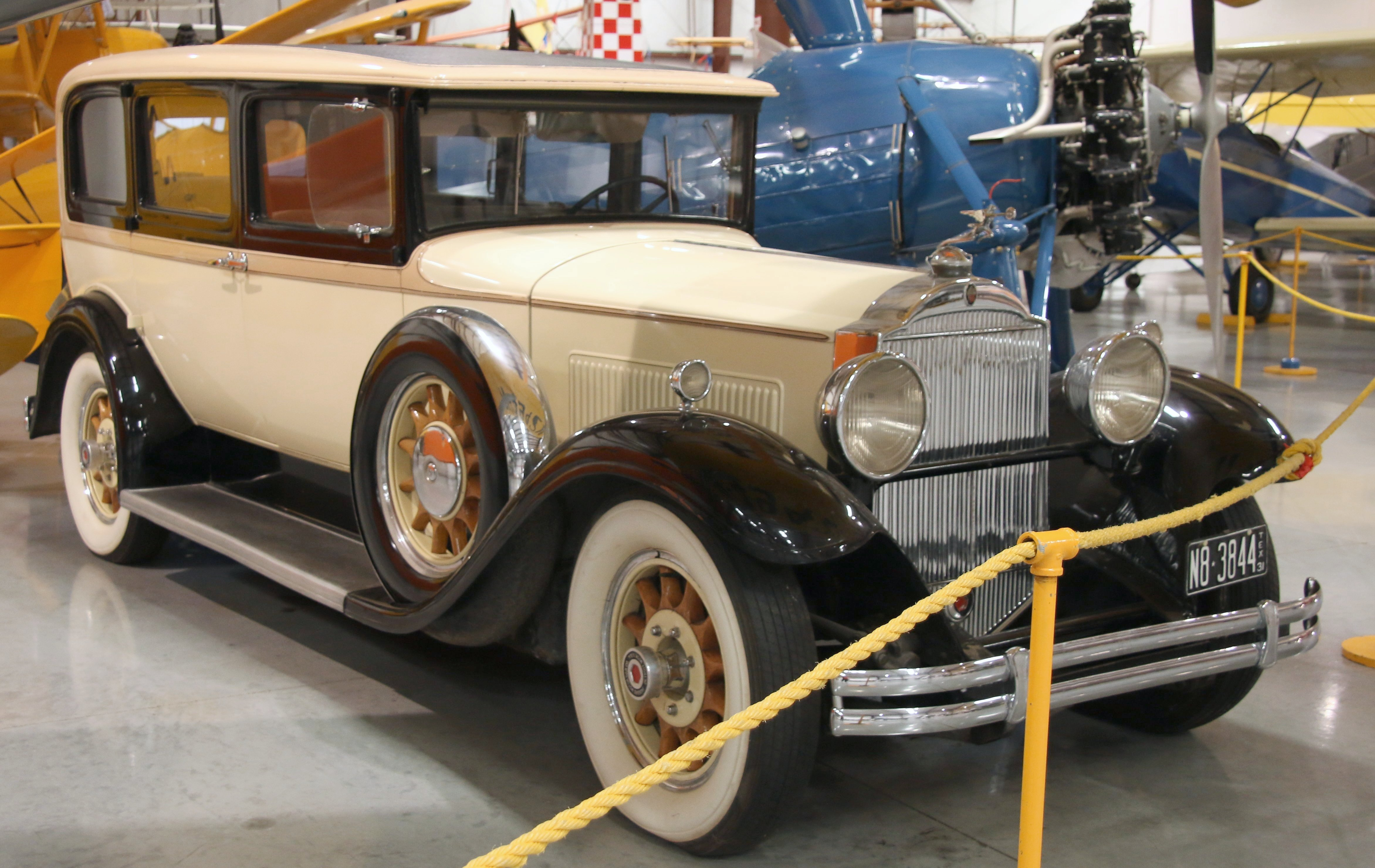
Yanks Air Museum

== Sports ==
Chino supports a variety of youth sports programs that play an important role in the community. Local organizations offer opportunities in soccer, baseball, softball, football, cheer, and track and field, with many teams holding practices and games at Ruben S. Ayala Park. Youth football and cheer programs in the city are part of the long-established Pop Warner organization, including teams such as Chino’s Tiny Mites, which was recognized during a City Council meeting in 2023.

These programs reflect the city’s emphasis on youth athletics and community participation.

== See also ==
- List of largest California cities by population
