= Battle of Chino =

1846 Mexican-American War battle

Coordinates: 33.990°N 117.718°W

- Part of Conquest of California; Mexican–American War
Date	September 26–27, 1846
Location	near Chino, California
Result	Mexican victory

Belligerents
Mexico	United States

Commanders and leaders
(Mexico) José del Carmen Lugo	(United States) Benjamin Wilson (surrendered)

Strength
50 militia	24 militia

Casualties and losses
1 killed 2 wounded	24 captured 3 wounded

The Battle of Chino, a skirmish of the Mexican–American War occurred on September 26–27, 1846, during which 24 Americans led by Benjamin D. Wilson, who were hiding in the adobe house of Rancho Santa Ana del Chino, were captured by a group of about 50 Californios.

== Background ==
Years of political unease preceded the battle. Tensions arose between the native Californios and the arriving American settlers, as well as within the Californio community itself. Divided loyalties fractured the region; some Californios maintained allegiance to the central Mexican authority, while others began to sympathize with the idea of American annexation out of frustration with the status quo. The San Bernardino Valley was highly susceptible to these divisions. Furthermore, the arrival of American settlers further exacerbated concerns over land seizure, cultural displacement, and legal authority. In late September 1846, as war between Mexico and the United States was declared, about 20 Americans led by Benjamin Davis Wilson assembled at Isaac Williams' Rancho Santa Ana del Chino. Williams, originally from Pennsylvania, had become a Mexican citizen – a prerequisite for owning land – and married Maria de Jesus Lugo, daughter of Antonio Maria Lugo. The Californios doubted the loyalty of Wilson's men and set out to arrest them.

== Battle ==
Serbulo Varela, Diego Sepulveda and Ramon Carrillo left Los Angeles with about fifty men, while José del Carmen Lugo with another fifteen to twenty men left from San Bernardino to converge upon Rancho del Chino. On the night of September 26, 1846, the adobe ranch house was surrounded by the Californios. At dawn, the following day, gunfire was exchanged resulting in one Californio (Carlos Ballesteros, son of the grantee of Rancho Rosa Castilla) dead with two wounded and three Americans wounded. American fighters were anticipating reinforcements from nearby forces, but they never came because of failed communication. They fortified the ranch house but were quickly overwhelmed. The Californios attempted to set fire to the roof of the house. Suffocation and limited ammunition forced Wilson to surrender to Varela. This brief engagement became known as the Battle of Chino.

== Notable Accounts ==
Wilson mentions in his memoirs that he gathered his group of soldiers at the Isaac Williams' ranch after hearing rumors of a Californio's revolt against American forces. After he and his men were defeated, they surrendered and were captured. While a prisoner, he observed high tensions amongst the Californio men – many advocating for the execution of the prisoners in retaliation for the death of their comrade. Wilson also notes that Serbulo Varela halted their intentions, threatening to defend the prisoners with force if necessary, to prevent their execution.

== Aftermath ==
Wilson's men were taken prisoner and marched to Paredon Blanco in Boyle Heights, the main camp of the Californio forces. The prisoners were nearly executed in retaliation for the death of Carlos Ballesteros, the only fatal casualty at Chino, but many were related by marriage to Mexican families, and Varela and others intervened. Later, the prisoners were taken to Rancho Los Cerritos, near present-day Long Beach, where they were detained and ultimately released.

== Significance ==
The Battle of Chino became part of a broader pattern of dispossession experienced by the Californios. Californios were required to provide documentation through land commissions established under U.S. law. Many of these documents had to be translated, certified, and evaluated in the light of new legislation. There were many cases where the paperwork was incomplete, lost, or misinterpreted; this caused land to be confiscated or sold off to speculators. These legal hurdles and a lack of political representation caused a drop in Californio influence in the years that followed. The Battle of Chino highlighted the degree to which California was internally divided. Some supported resistance, while others sought solace in the incoming American rule. The event also marked one of the last times that Californio forces successfully captured a group of armed Americans. Within months, U.S. military dominance across California made such events rare. The Battle of Chino serves as a marker in the slow change from a contested frontier to an incorporated U.S. territory, and from Mexican rule to American governance.

== See also ==
- Battles of the Mexican–American War
- List of conflicts in the United States
