= Max Zendejas =

Mexican gridiron football player (born 1963)

No. 14, 8
- Position: Placekicker

Personal information
- Born: September 2, 1963 (age 63); Curimeo, Mexico
- Listed height: 5 ft 11 in (1.80 m)
- Listed weight: 184 lb (83 kg)

Career information
- High school: Don Antonio Lugo (Chino, California, U.S.)
- College: Arizona
- NFL draft: 1986: 4th round, 100th overall pick

Career history
- Dallas Cowboys (1986)*; Washington Redskins (1986); Green Bay Packers (1987–1988); Indianapolis Colts (1990)*; London Monarchs (1991)*
- * Offseason or practice squad member only

Awards and highlights
- 2× Second-team All-Pac-10 (1983, 1985)

Career NFL statistics
- Field goal attempts: 49
- Field goals made: 34
- Field goal %: 69.4
- Stats at Pro Football Reference

Maximmillian Javier Zendejas (born September 2, 1963) is a Mexican former professional American football placekicker in the National Football League (NFL) for the Washington Redskins and Green Bay Packers. He played college football at the University of Arizona.

== Early life ==
Zendejas, was born in Curimeo, Mexico as one of nine children. His parents moved the family to Chino, California when he was 6 years old. Soccer was the main sport for the Zendejas family.

He attended Don Antonio Lugo High School, where he followed his older brother Luis footsteps, playing both football and soccer. He did not begin to play football until his senior year, because he wanted to wait for Luis to graduate. That season, he made 4 field goals of over 50 yards.

== College career ==
Zendejas accepted a football scholarship from the University of Arizona where he became a four-year starter. As a freshman in 1982, he made a 48-yard field goal with 6 seconds remaining in a 16–13 win over then No. 9 University of Notre Dame in South Bend, Indiana. The next year, he kicked a 45-yard field with 3 seconds left to beat Arizona State University 18–17 in Tempe, Arizona.

In 1985, he was chosen as the team's most valuable player when he led the conference with 22 field goals and was second with 89 points (behind John Lee). He was also the Sun Bowl MVP and received honorable-mention All-American honors.

Zendejas graduated after breaking almost every kicking record in school history, including career field goals (79), career points (360), career field goal percentage (.738), consecutive field goals made (11), season field goals (22) and career field goals over 50 yards (13). He finished tied for third on the NCAA career field goal list (77), fourth on the career scoring list (360) and tied the record for consecutive games with a field goal (18). Some of his most impressive statistics were that with the game on the line he made 5-of-6 field goals and his field goal percentage from 50 yards or more was 61% (14-of-23).

In 1999, he was inducted into the University of Arizona Sports Hall of Fame.

== Professional career ==
=== Dallas Cowboys ===
Zendejas was selected by the Dallas Cowboys in the fourth round (100th overall) of the 1986 NFL draft. It is the highest position where Dallas has ever drafted a placekicker, because at the time the team was concerned about Rafael Septien's recurring back problems. A healthy Septien won the preseason competition and Zendejas was waived on September 1.

=== Washington Redskins ===
On October 13, 1986, he was signed as a free agent by the Washington Redskins to take over Mark Moseley's role, who at the time was a 16-year veteran and the oldest kicker in the National Football League. Although he helped the Redskins to qualify for the playoffs by making a 27-yard field goal with four seconds left in a 20–17 win over the St. Louis Cardinals, after missing five field goals and five extra point conversions in nine games, he was replaced with Jess Atkinson and was put on the injured reserve list with one week left in the regular season. On August 20, 1987, he was released after losing the preseason kicking competition with Atkinson.

=== Green Bay Packers ===
After the players went on a strike on the third week of the 1987 season, those games were canceled (reducing the 16-game season to 15) and the NFL decided that the games would be played with replacement players. Zendejas was signed to be a part of the Green Bay Packers replacement team and was kept for the rest of the season, after making all of his 7 field goal attempts. On November 11, he was activated to take over the kicking role in place of a struggling Al Del Greco. The team would later waive Del Greco on November 25.

In 1988, he tied a franchise record with four field goals in a victory over the Minnesota Vikings on October 16. He was released on October 25, after making 9 of 16 attempts and missing the game-tying field goal against the Washington Redskins with 11 seconds left in regulation.

=== Indianapolis Colts ===
On July 24, 1990, he was signed by the Indianapolis Colts, who were protecting themselves in the case of an extended contract holdout by Dean Biasucci. He was waived on August 21.

=== London Monarchs ===
In 1991, he was drafted by the London Monarchs of the World League of American Football, but was cut on March 17.

== Personal life ==
His brothers Luis and Joaquin also played professional football. His nephew, Alex Zendejas Jr. was also a placekicker for the University of Arizona. His cousins Tony Zendejas and Marty Zendejas also had success in college and professional football.
