= Joaquin Zendejas =

Mexican gridiron football player (born 1960)

No. 2
- Position: Placekicker

Personal information
- Born: January 14, 1960 (age 66); Curimeo, Mexico
- Listed height: 5 ft 11 in (1.80 m)
- Listed weight: 176 lb (80 kg)

Career information
- High school: Don Antonio Lugo (Chino, California, U.S.)
- College: La Verne
- NFL draft: 1983: undrafted

Career history
- San Diego Chargers (1983)*; New England Patriots (1983); San Francisco 49ers (1984)*
- * Offseason or practice squad member only

Career NFL statistics
- Games played: 2
- Stats at Pro Football Reference

Joaquin Zendejas Jr. (born January 14, 1960) is a Mexican former placekicker in the National Football League (NFL) for the New England Patriots. He played college football at the University of La Verne.

== Early life ==
Zendejas, was born in Curimeo, Mexico as part of nine children. His parents moved the family to Chino, California. He attended Don Antonio Lugo High School, where he played as a forward in soccer.

Zendejas accepted a soccer scholarship from Division III University of La Verne. He began to play football as a junior, kicking a school-record 55-yard field goal against Pomona College, while making 22 out of 35 field goal attempts during the season.

As a senior, he was limited with leg and shoulder injuries he suffered playing soccer, which affected his production in football. To rest his right leg, he used his left foot for kickoffs and also to score a 52-yard field goal against the Southern California's junior-varsity team. He finished his college career after making 29 out of 52 field goal attempts.

== Professional career ==
Zendejas was signed as an undrafted free agent by the San Diego Chargers after the 1983 NFL draft. He also was selected by the Boston Breakers in the 23rd round (275th overall) of the 1983 USFL draft. He was the first of the Zendejas family to reach the NFL. He made his only field goal attempt (a 49-yarder) during the preseason. He was waived on August 23, after not being able to pass Rolf Benirschke on the depth chart.

On December 6, 1983, he was signed as a free agent by the New England Patriots, to replace kicker Fred Steinfort, who had missed 6 of his last 8 field goal attempts. He appeared in the last 2 games and became the first kicker in Patriots history, to play in the regular season without kicking in their home stadium (Sullivan Stadium). On July 26, 1984, he was cut after not being able to pass Tony Franklin on the depth chart, who was acquired in a trade in February.

In July 1984, he was signed as a free agent by the San Francisco 49ers. On August 13, he was released after not being able to pass Ray Wersching on the depth chart.

== Personal life ==
His brothers Luis and Max also played professional football. His nephew, Alex Zendejas Jr. was a placekicker for the University of Arizona. His cousins Tony Zendejas and Marty Zendejas also had success in college and professional football.
