= Tony Zendejas =

Mexico-born American football player (born 1960)

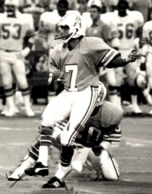
- Zendejas with the Houston Oilers in 1985

No. 11, 7, 10, 2
- Position: Placekicker

Personal information
- Born: May 15, 1960 (age 66); Curimeo, Michoacán, Mexico
- Listed height: 5 ft 8 in (1.73 m)
- Listed weight: 165 lb (75 kg)

Career information
- High school: Chino (Chino, California, U.S.)
- College: Nevada
- Supplemental draft: 1984: 1st round, 27th overall pick

Career history
- Los Angeles Express (1983–1985); Washington Redskins (1984)*; Houston Oilers (1985–1990); Los Angeles Rams (1991–1994); Atlanta Falcons (1995); San Francisco 49ers (1995)
- * Offseason or practice squad member only

Awards and highlights
- 2× Division I-AA All-American (1981, 1983); 3× All-Big Sky (1981, 1982, 1983)

Career NFL statistics
- Field goals / attempts: 186 / 252
- Field goal %: 73.8
- Longest field goal: 54
- PATs / attempts: 316 / 327
- PAT %: 96.6
- Stats at Pro Football Reference

Antonio Guerrero Zendejas (born May 15, 1960) is a Mexican-American former professional football placekicker. He was signed as an undrafted free agent by the Los Angeles Express of the United States Football League (USFL). After the USFL folded, he was selected in the first round of the 1984 NFL Supplemental draft by the Washington Redskins.

In his career, Zendejas also played for the Houston Oilers, Los Angeles Rams, Atlanta Falcons, and San Francisco 49ers of the National Football League (NFL).

== Early life ==
Zendejas was born in Curimeo, Michoacán, Mexico. His parents moved the family to Chino, California. As a 12-year-old, he led the youth soccer league with 100 goals scored in one season.

He attended Chino High School where he practiced both soccer and football. As a junior, although he alternated at kicker with senior Tony Gonzales, he still managed to convert 7 field goals and 11 extra points in 12 games. His 53-yard field goal against Ganesha High School, was the second longest in CIF history.

As a senior, he set a single-season school record with 10 field goals. He also received All-CIF honors in soccer.

== College career ==
In 1979, he enrolled at Santa Ana Junior College. At the time his main sport was soccer, until breaking his leg during a soccer tournament just before having a scheduled tryout with the Los Angeles Aztecs of the North American Soccer League.

In 1980, he transferred to Mt. San Antonio College. Although he could not play football while recovering from his injury, University of Nevada assistant coach John Smith recruited him based on what he did in high school.

In 1981, he transferred to Division I-AA University of Nevada, where he played under head coach Chris Ault. As a sophomore, he set school records for field goals made in a single-season (21) and longest field goal (55 yards).

As a junior, he set new conference and school records for field goals attempted (33) and field goals made (26).

As a senior, he converted 23 field goals and broke his school record for longest field goal (58 yards). He also made a 32-yard field goal in blizzard conditions to help win an overtime playoff game against the University of North Texas.

Zendejas played three seasons at Nevada, in 33 games he registered 70 field goals, 90 extra points and 300 points, while leading the nation in field goals made every year. Most of his kicking records were eventually broken by younger brother Marty Zendejas.

== Professional career ==
Initially, he played in the United States Football League for the Los Angeles Express. He joined the National Football League when he was chosen by the Washington Redskins in the first round of the 1984 NFL Supplemental Draft of USFL and CFL Players.

During his eleven seasons in the NFL, Zendejas made 186 field goals in 252 attempts; he also scored 316 extra points for 874 points. He held the record for consecutive field goals made from 50 or more yards with 11 such kicks until 2013 when the record was eclipsed by Blair Walsh of the Minnesota Vikings and Robbie Gould of the Chicago Bears.

In 1991, he became the first kicker in NFL history to convert all of his field goal attempts, going 17-of-17. He fell one missed extra point short of having the first "perfect season" for a kicker, a mark Gary Anderson reached seven years later.

== NFL career statistics ==
Year	Team	GP	Overall FGs					PATs				Kickoffs					Total points
Year	Team	GP	Blk	Lng	FGA	FGM	Pct	XPA	XPM	Pct	Blk	KO	Avg	TB	Ret	Avg	Total points
1985	HOU	14	0	52	27	21	77.8	31	29	93.5	0	—	—	—	—	—	92
1986	HOU	15	0	51	27	22	81.5	29	28	96.6	0	—	—	—	—	—	94
1987	HOU	13	0	52	26	20	76.9	33	32	97.0	0	—	—	—	—	—	92
1988	HOU	16	0	52	34	22	64.7	50	48	96.0	0	—	—	—	—	—	114
1989	HOU	16	0	52	37	25	67.6	40	40	100.0	0	—	—	—	—	—	115
1990	HOU	7	0	45	12	7	58.3	21	20	95.2	0	—	—	—	—	—	41
1991	RAMS	16	0	50	17	17	100.0	26	25	86.2	0	58	59.6	13	—	—	76
1992	RAMS	16	1	49	20	15	75.0	38	38	100.0	1	69	58.6	11	55	20.5	83
1993	RAMS	16	2	54	23	16	69.6	25	23	92.0	0	57	60.1	10	47	20.9	71
1994	RAMS	16	2	47	23	18	78.3	28	28	100.0	0	67	58.7	1	63	23.0	82
1995	ATL	1	0	45	3	2	66.7	0	0	—	—	4	64.5	0	4	24.0	6
1995	SF	3	1	38	3	1	33.3	6	5	83.3	1	—	—	—	—	—	8
Career		149	6	54	252	186	78.3	327	316	96.6	2	255	45.7	35	169	21.6	874

== Personal life ==
Zendejas was accused of drugging and raping a woman in January 2008, but he was acquitted of all charges in 2009. He owns and operates Zendajas Mexican Restaurant in San Dimas, California known to be very popular with Rams fans during the regular season games. He is the older brother of former Nevada and Arena league kicker Marty Zendejas, and the cousin of former NFL kickers Joaquin Zendejas, Luis Zendejas and Max Zendejas.
