= Chaffey Joint Union High School District =

School district in California

Address
- 211 West Fifth Street Ontario, California, 91762; United States
- Coordinates: 34.081118°N 117.652081°W

District information
- Type: Public
- Motto: "All CJUHSD students will graduate ready for college and careers."
- Grades: 9–12
- Established: 1882; 144 years ago
- President: Sue Ovitt
- Vice-president: John Rhinehart
- Superintendent: Mathew Holton, Ed.D.
- School board: Chaffey Joint Union High School District Board of Trustees
- NCES District ID: 0608160

Students and staff
- Enrollment: 25,000
- Staff: 970.13 (on an FTE basis)
- Student–teacher ratio: 24.59

Other information
- Clerk: Charles Uhalley
- Trustee(s): Shari S. Megaw; Art Bustamonte
- Website: www.cjuhsd.net

Chaffey Joint Union High School District is a 9–12 school district located in San Bernardino County, California, United States that serves the communities of Ontario, Montclair, Rancho Cucamonga, and portions of Fontana, Upland, Chino, and Mount Baldy. With more than 25,000 students, it is one of the largest high school districts in the state. The district operates eight comprehensive high schools, one online high school, one continuation high school, one community day school, and one adult education school.

A portion of Los Angeles County is within the district.

== History ==
The union high school district began in 1882 when George and William Chaffey, the founders of Ontario, began the Chaffey College of Agriculture and an on-campus secondary school with assistance from the University of Southern California. Ironically, the university abandoned the agricultural school while Chaffey was away in Australia, so he pursued litigation and eventually won. In 1901 control of the secondary school was given to the local community and it was named Ontario High School, only to be renamed Chaffey High School in 1911. It would be the only secondary school in the area until end of World War II when an increase in Ontario's population prompted additional schools.

Upland High School, Montclair High School, Alta Loma High School, and Ontario High School were built between 1955 and 1967. Another school did not open until Etiwanda High School in 1983. Upland High School left the district and became part of the Upland Unified School District in 1991. Shortly after, Rancho Cucamonga High School opened in 1992. Funds from Measure X, a $128 million General Obligation Bond, allowed the district to build additional schools. Colony High School and Los Osos High School opened in the fall of 2002.

In 2004, Chaffey proposed building a new high school in Fontana on the corner of walnut and San Sevaine. The project was known as Chaffey Joint Union High School District, High School #9

The district enrolls students who desire a high school education but cannot speak English at Newcomer School for one year in order to learn enough English to complete the high school curriculum, graduate and continue their education.

In 2012, voters within the district passed an $848 million bond issue—the largest investment in classrooms, facilities and technology in the district's more than 100-year history. More than 60 percent of voters supported the measure. On September 10, 2013, ground was broken on the first significant project to be paid for under the bond, a two-story classroom annex at Ontario High School.

In recent years the district has entered into formal agreements with California State Polytechnic University, Pomona, California State University, San Bernardino, and California State University, Bakersfield to guarantee admission to Chaffey District students who meet minimum requirements for admission.

On April 21, 2014, Chaffey Superintendent Mathew Holton was honored as Superintendent of the Year by the Association of California School Administrators Region 12.

The school year in the Chaffey Joint Union High School District begins in August and ends in May before the Memorial Day holiday, with the first semester ending in mid-December before the winter break.

Starting with the Class of 2017, all eight comprehensive high schools hold their annual graduation ceremonies at the football fields located in each of the campuses.

Board of Trustees members are elected to a four-year term, by geographical district starting with the November 2018 elections.

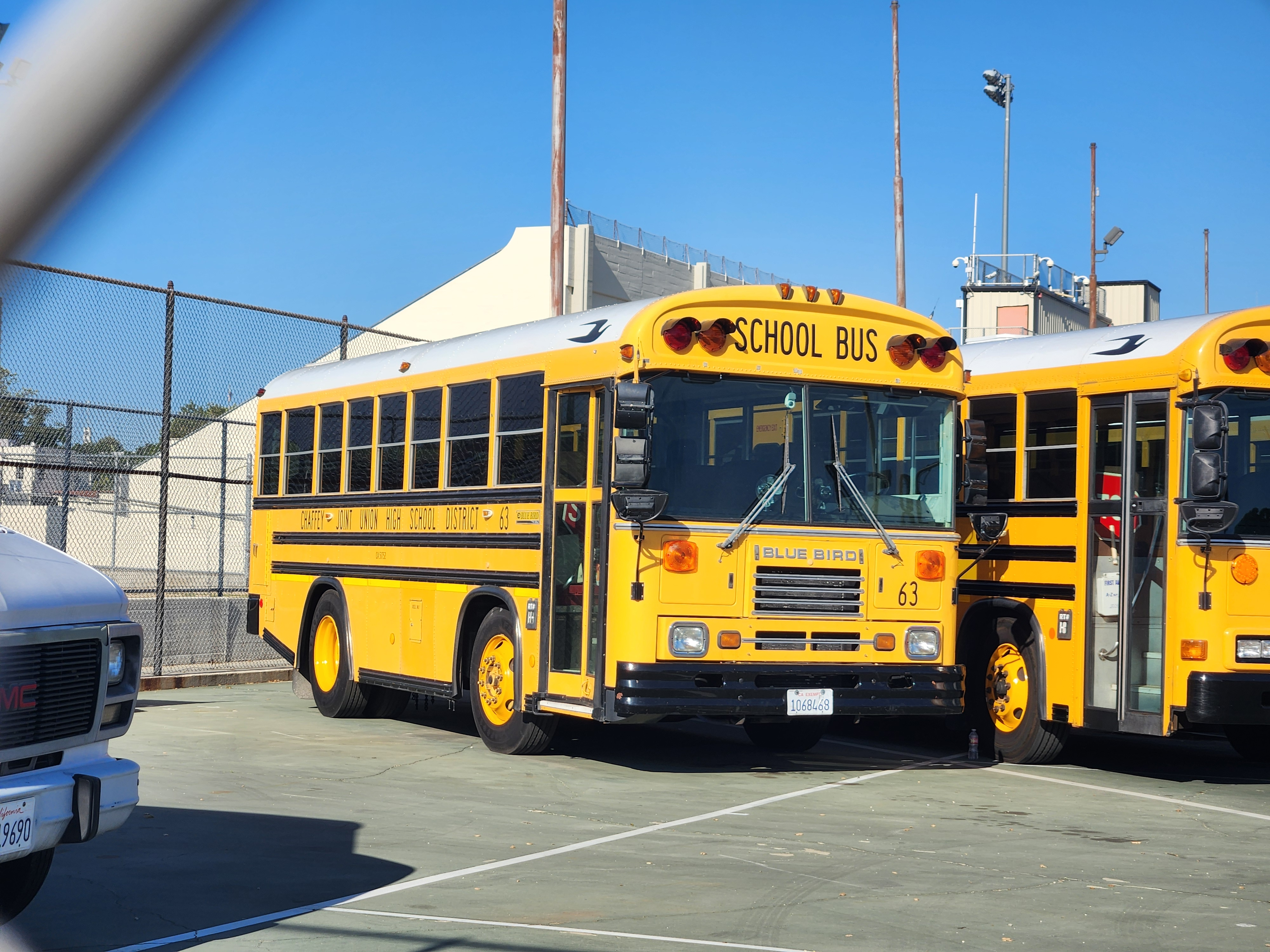
Blue Bird TC/2000

== Schools ==
=== High schools ===
- Alta Loma High School in Rancho Cucamonga
- Chaffey High School in Ontario
- Colony High School in Ontario
- Etiwanda High School in Rancho Cucamonga
- Los Osos High School in Rancho Cucamonga
- Montclair High School in Montclair
- Ontario High School in Ontario
- Rancho Cucamonga High School in Rancho Cucamonga

=== Continuation High Schools ===
- Valley View High School in Ontario

=== Community day schools ===
- Chaffey Adult School in Ontario
- Community Day School in San Bernardino

=== Online high schools ===
- Chaffey District Online High School in Ontario

=== Alternative education ===
- Newcomer School

== Districts served ==
The Chaffey School District draws from the following seven elementary school districts:

- Alta Loma School District in Rancho Cucamonga
- Central School District in Rancho Cucamonga
- Cucamonga School District in Rancho Cucamonga
- Etiwanda School District in Etiwanda
- Mountain View School District in Ontario
- Mt Baldy School District in Mount Baldy
- Ontario-Montclair School District in Ontario

== Notable alumni ==
- Gerald Alexander, former Boise State safety, five-year NFL veteran
- Hobie Alter, surfing and sailing entrepreneur
- Jeff Ayres (formerly Jeff Pendergraph), NBA player for the San Antonio Spurs and former Arizona State player
- Carlos Bocanegra (graduated 1997), professional soccer player and former USMNT captain
- Richard Brehaut, UCLA quarterback
- Vincent Brown, wide receiver for the San Diego Chargers
- Jim Brulte, California Assemblyperson
- Charles Castronovo (graduated 1993), tenor and opera singer
- Patrick Chung, former All-American safety for the Oregon Ducks, now plays for the New England Patriots
- Kenyon Coleman (graduated 1997), NFL football player
- Darren Collison, NBA player for the Los Angeles Clippers, former UCLA player, New Orleans Hornets and Indiana Pacers player
- William De Los Santos, screenwriter and movie director
- Bob Doll, professional basketball player
- Stewart Donaldson, author, psychologist, evaluation research scientist
- Cameron Dunn (graduated 2001), professional soccer player for Los Angeles Blues
- Maurice Edu, professional soccer player, Rangers F.C., and regular on US Men's National Team; played in the 2010 World Cup in South Africa
- Bruce Grube, president of St. Cloud State University and Georgia Southern University
- Nijah Harris, America's Next Top Model Cycle 12 contestant
- Marvin Jones, NFL player for the Cincinnati Bengals
- Rocky Long (graduated 1968), college football coach
- Brenda Martinez, runner, 3rd in the world in 800 meters in 2013
- Shelly Martinez, professional World Wrestling Entertainment/Extreme Championship Wrestling wrestler, actress, and model
- Larry Maxie, professional baseball player (Atlanta Braves)
- Sid Monge (graduated 1970), retired Major League Baseball relief pitcher
- Anthony Muñoz, professional football player, 1998 Football Hall of Fame inductee
- Al Newman, Major League Baseball player for the Minnesota Twins; member of Twins 1987 and 1991 World Championship teams
- Nichkhun, Thai-American entertainer, member of the South Korean boy band 2PM
- Joan O'Brien, actress; starred in films with Elvis Presley, Cary Grant and John Wayne
- Adam Parada (graduated 1999), professional basketball player
- Addison Reed, Major League Baseball pitcher for the New York Mets
- Hal Reniff, professional baseball player (New York Yankees, New York Mets)
- Juan Roque, NFL football player with Detroit Lions 1997–1999; played for CFL with Toronto Argonauts in 2001; Arizona State University Sports Hall of Fame inductee in 2000
- Robert Shaw, conductor
- C. J. Stroud, quarterback for the Houston Texans
- Mike Sweeney, Major League Baseball player for the Kansas City Royals; played for the 1991 varsity baseball team that won the CIF Southern Section state title with an undefeated 26-0 record
- Terrell Thomas, cornerback for USC and the New York Giants
- Craig Lamar Traylor, actor, played Stevie on Malcolm in the Middle
- Gary Wagner, disc jockey
- Joseph Wambaugh, best-selling fiction author
- Eric Weddle (graduated 2003), San Diego Chargers' defensive back
- Kendall Williams, University of New Mexico starting point guard
- The Young Bucks, brothers in TNA Wrestling
