= Chaffey =

Chaffey may refer to:

== People ==
- Chaffey (surname)

== Education ==
- Chaffey College in California
- Chaffey High School in California
- Chaffey Joint Union High School District in California
- Chaffey Adult School in California

== Places ==
=== Australia ===
- Chaffey, South Australia, a locality in the District Council of Renmark Paringa
- Electoral district of Chaffey in South Australia
- Chaffey Dam, a dam on the Peel River, New South Wales

=== United States ===
- Chaffey, Wisconsin, an unincorporated community
