= The Torkelsons =

American sitcom

- Also known as: Almost Home (season 2 title)
- Genre: Sitcom
- Created by: Lynn Montgomery
- Developed by: Michael Jacobs
- Starring: Connie Ray; Olivia Burnette; Elizabeth Poyer; Anna Slotky; Benj Thall; Aaron Michael Metchik; Lee Norris; Rachel Duncan; Ernie Lively; William Schallert; Brittany Murphy; Jason Marsden; Perry King
- Theme music composer: Michael Jacobs & Ray Colcord
- Opening theme: "A New Day Promises", performed by The Judds (season 1) "Almost Home" performed by Jennifer Warnes and Joey Scarbury (season 2)
- Composer: Ray Colcord
- Country of origin: United States
- Original language: English
- No. of seasons: 2
- No. of episodes: 33

Production
- Executive producers: Michael Jacobs; Charlotte Brown (season 2)
- Producers: Wayne Lemon; Philip LaZebnik; Arlene Grayson (all; entire run); Dawn Tarnofsky; Thomas Szollosi; Richard Christian Matheson; Lynn Montgomery; Mitchell Bank; Arlene Sanford (all; season 1)
- Camera setup: Multi-camera
- Running time: 22–24 minutes
- Production companies: Michael Jacobs Productions; Walt Disney Television (1991-1992) (season 1); Touchstone Television (1993) (season 2)

Original release
- Network: NBC
- Release: September 21, 1991 – June 6, 1993

The Torkelsons is an American sitcom television series that aired on the NBC television network from September 21, 1991, to June 6, 1993. Produced by Michael Jacobs Productions, Walt Disney Television in season 1 and Touchstone Television in season 2, the series starred Connie Ray, Olivia Burnette, and William Schallert. Connie Ray plays a single mother, Millicent Torkelson, and her five children living in the small town of Pyramid Corners, Oklahoma. The show focuses on their struggles to make ends meet after Millicent's husband leaves, forcing her to take in a boarder and confront financial hardship. For the second season, the series was retooled and renamed Almost Home. The series only aired for two seasons and consisted of 33 episodes.

== Cast ==
=== Main ===
- Connie Ray as Millicent Torkelson
- Olivia Burnette as Dorothy Jane Torkelson, Millicent's first daughter
- Elizabeth Poyer (pilot) & Anna Slotky as Ruth Ann Torkelson, Millicent's second daughter (season 1)
- Benj Thall (pilot) & Aaron Michael Metchik as Steven Floyd Torkelson, Millicent's first son (season 1)
- Lee Norris as Chuckie Lee Torkelson, Millicent's second son
- Rachel Duncan as Mary Sue Torkelson, Millicent's third daughter
- Ernie Lively (pilot) as Jacob Presley (season 1)
- William Schallert as Wesley Hodges (season 1)
- Brittany Murphy as Molly Morgan, Brian's daughter (season 2)
- Jason Marsden as Gregory Morgan, Brian's son (season 2)
- Perry King as Brian Morgan (season 2)

=== Recurring ===
- Paige Gosney as Kirby Scroggins (season 1)
- Michael Landes as Riley Roberts (season 1)
- Ronnie Claire Edwards as Bootsie Torkelson (season 1)
- Alyson Kiperman as Dreama (season 1)
- Mother Love as Kitty Drysdale (season 1)
- Peter Van Norden as Mel (season 2)
- Alyson Hannigan as Samantha (season 2)

=== Notable guest stars ===
- Drew Carey in the season 1 episode "Say Uncle" (his first appearance in a TV sitcom)
- Patty Duke in the season 1 episode "Return to Sender" (reuniting with William Schallert, who played her father on The Patty Duke Show)
- Kevin Clash as Elmo in the season 1 episode "Educating Millicent"
- Joey Lawrence as Dorothy Jane and Molly's boss in the season 2 episode "Girls and Boy"
- Erin Gray in the season 2 episode "Sleeping with the Enemy" as Mr. Morgan's love interest
- Ben Affleck in the season 2 episode "Is That All There Is?" as a basketball player who falls in love with Dorothy Jane
- Jared Leto in the season 2 episode "The Fox and the Hound" as a football player at a party that Molly throws, whom Dorothy Jane thinks is cute
- Donal Logue in the season 2 episode "Hot Ticket" as a musician named "Tommy Tom"

Gregg Henry as Randall Torkelson Season 1 Christopher Rich Season 2

== Production notes ==
Series creator Lynn Montgomery claims to have gotten the name "Torkelson" from a real life Steven Floyd Torkelson, who had shown her his bug collection, and shared his first kiss with her thirty years earlier.

== Episodes ==
=== Series overview ===
Season	Episodes	Originally released	
Season	Episodes	First released	Last released
1	20	September 21, 1991	June 13, 1992
2	13	February 6, 1993	June 12, 1993

=== Season 1 (1991–92) ===
No. overall	No. in season	Title	Directed by	Written by	Original release date	Prod. code	Viewers (millions)
1	1	"Fence Neighbors"	Arlene Sanford	Lynn Montgomery	September 21, 1991	T-401	20.2
Millicent Torkelson is a single mother trying to get by while raising five children in the small town of Pyramid Corners, Oklahoma. When Millicent finds out the family is in dire financial straits, she is forced to take in a boarder, but when Wesley Hodges looks at the place, Millicent's 14-year-old daughter Dorothy Jane is not thrilled when her mom offers Wesley her bedroom to stay in. Meanwhile, a new family moves in next door and Dorothy Jane develops a crush on her new 17-year-old neighbor Riley (Michael Landes).
2	2	"The Cotillion"	Arlene Sanford	Lynn Montgomery	September 28, 1991	T-403	14.7
High school freshman Dorothy Jane has always dreamed of going to her first high school cotillion. Things do not seem as glorious as she thought however, when she cannot find a date and does not even have a dress. Things are made even more complicated when her crush Riley seems to be oblivious and Dorothy Jane lands a date with a boy who is anything but her dream date. Meanwhile, Millicent's mother-in-law tries to find out what is in the letters marked "return to sender" that Wesley has been receiving.
3	3	"A Kiss is Still a Kiss"	Arlene Sanford	Wayne Lemon	October 5, 1991	T-404	15.6
Dorothy Jane tries to set up a romance between her mom Millicent and the church's new pastor (Jeff McCracken); the pastor sends Steven Floyd home after a hayride, after Millicent's eldest son gets caught french kissing a girl, upsetting Dorothy Jane, who cannot believe her younger brother got his first kiss before her.
4	4	"For Love or Money"	Arlene Sanford	Norma Safford Vela	October 12, 1991	T-402	15.1
Millicent is reluctant to find regular employment outside of her custom upholstery business, feeling it would be an admission that her estranged husband is not coming back, but decides to interview for a job as a telephone operator in order to make ends meet; Dorothy Jane volunteers to take on the responsibility of looking after her siblings Steven Floyd, Mary Sue, Chuckie Lee and Ruth Ann every day after school while Millicent is working, in order to prove to her mom that she can be responsible.
5	5	"Poetry in Motion"	Arlene Sanford	Philip LaZebnik	October 19, 1991	T-406	13.6
Ruth Ann decides to blackmail Dorothy Jane by revealing some of private romantic poems to the world, but the plan backfires when the revelation ends up emboldening the lovelorn teenager, encouraging Dorothy Jane to write more.
6	6	"An American Almost in Paris"	Arlene Sanford	Story by : Lynn Montgomery & Diana "Jennie" Ayers & Susan Sebastian; Teleplay by : Lynn Montgomery	October 26, 1991	T-408	10.7
Dorothy Jane wants desperately to bid adieu to Pyramid Corners, Oklahoma and travel to Paris, and she might get the opportunity if she is selected as the winner in a student foreign exchange competition. When Dreama (Alyson Kiperman) informs Dorothy Jane that the selection committee is visiting the finalists at their homes, Dorothy Jane becomes nervous that her family might jinx her shot at being chosen to be sent to France.
7	7	"Men Don't Leave"	Arlene Sanford	Diana "Jennie" Ayers & Susan Sebastian	November 2, 1991	T-405	15.0
The family gets a surprise when Millicent's estranged husband Randall Torkelson (Gregg Henry) returns to Pyramid Corners from Texas more than a year after leaving his wife. Randall's arrival sparks an ill will for Dorothy Jane, who is still upset that her dad left in the first place; Millicent questions whether she wants her husband back when he decides to stay after spending time with his children.
8	8	"Thanksgivingmesomething"	Arlene Sanford	Wayne Lemon	November 24, 1991	T-407	9.3
Pastor Langley is invited by Millicent to the Torkelson house for Thanksgiving at her daughter Dorothy Jane's insistence, prompting Dorothy Jane, who worries that her mother may never find love again if she does not try to make the next move, to push Millicent to play up her femininity in the hopes her mother will snag a date with him; Millicent also invites Dave, a Native American who has never celebrated Thanksgiving before to spend the holiday with the family.
9	9	"Return to Sender"	Arlene Sanford	Michael Jacobs & Norma Safford Vela	November 24, 1991	T-409	9.3
After Millicent finds a letter in a package mailed to Wesley, she does some well-intentioned butting in to reunite Wesley with the granddaughter he hasn't seen in some time and his estranged former daughter-in-law (Patty Duke).
10	10	"I Fought the Law"	Arlene Sanford	Philip LaZebnik	December 1, 1991	T-410	7.6
When Millicent sells her homemade pickled goods, her annual roadside stand is shut down by the police for operating without a license; she decides to stand up for her rights and sell her products in the house illegally, leading to her get taken into custody. The family later discovers that the reason behind the shutdown is due to Millicent's stand competing against a farmer's market run by a town councilman.
11	11	"A Sigh is Just a Sigh"	Arlene Sanford	Wayne Lemon	December 8, 1991	T-411	12.1
The school principal calls Millicent when Steven Floyd beats up a bully named Billy Ray Hawkins for talking badly about his mother; when she confronts him about it, Steven Floyd does not tell her the reason behind the fight and gets grounded. After Chuckie Lee gets beaten up by Billy Ray's brother in retaliation, Millicent gives Steven Floyd a major chewing out; when Chuckie Lee tells her why his brother beat up Billy Ray and comes to his room to apologize for being unfair to him, she discovers her son ran away from home. Meanwhile, an ill Dorothy Jane, stuck at home in bed, is paid an unwanted visit by Kirby.
12	12	"Educating Millicent"	Arlene Sanford	Story by : Connie Ray & Lynn Montgomery; Teleplay by : Lynn Montgomery	December 22, 1991	T-412	7.6
When Millicent has trouble helping Dorothy Jane with her homework and her family looks through her old school yearbooks but can't find her picture, she makes the admission to her children that she never finished high school. Wesley suggests that Millicent could take her high school equivalency exam, but she does not think that she can pass the test. Dorothy Jane and Mary Sue convince their mother to take the exam, which ends up taking a toll on Millicent, leading her to imagine that Mary Sue's Elmo (puppeteered by Kevin Clash) doll has come to life and convinces Millicent to hang in there.
13	13	"Double Date"	Arlene Sanford	Thomas Szollosi & Richard Christian Matheson	January 9, 1992	T-414	19.7
Dorothy Jane calls talk radio host Kitty Drysdale, also known as the "Love Professor" (Mother Love), about her dilemma of wanting to go out on dates but facing the apprehension of her single mother Millicent about her desire to venture into the dating world, so Kitty drops by the Torkelson house to help Dorothy Jane and Millicent jump-start their dating lives.
14	14	"The Ice Princess"	Arlene Sanford	Philip LaZebnik	January 12, 1992	T-413	9.0
After being rejected by Riley, Dorothy Jane looks to the school's resident ice princess Callie Kimbrough for guidance and makes a radical change to her look, when she resolves to become the type of girl who can make guys melt.
15	15	"Swear Not By the Moon"	Arlene Sanford	Wayne Lemon	January 19, 1992	T-415	7.8
Dorothy Jane auditions for the role of Juliet in the school production of Romeo & Juliet (which is retooled as a western since they're in Oklahoma); when she lands the role, Dorothy Jane is nervous about playing the part, since she is having to play opposite the man of that she dreams of being her own Romeo, her 18-year-old crush Riley Roberts. Things get even tougher when she realizes that he is going to have to kiss her and Millicent is a little uncomfortable since the play calls for a love scene between Romeo and Juliet. Meanwhile, Ruth Ann decides to retaliate after Dorothy Jane rejects her offer to provide music for the play by shaving off Dorothy Jane's left eyebrow in her sleep.
16	16	"Say Uncle"	Arlene Sanford	Wayne Lemon	February 16, 1992	T-418	5.9
Dorothy Jane and Millicent both have members of the Scroggins family with unrequited crushes on them. After seeing Dorothy Jane crush the feelings of lovesick Kirby yet again, Millicent tells her daughter to start being nicer to Kirby even if she does not share his feelings, but the plan backfires when Kirby takes Dorothy Jane's sudden kindness as a sign that she is in love with him and pursues her even more than ever. Dorothy Jane decides to see if Millicent can live up to her own advice by introducing her to Kirby's repulsive uncle Herby Scroggins, who develops a major crush on her.
17	17	"The Long Goodbye"	Arlene Sanford	Philip LaZebnik & Wayne Lemon & Thomas Szollosi & Lynn Montgomery & Richard Christian Matheson	May 2, 1992	T-420	15.7
Randall Torkelson drops back into his family's lives once again with a big hello for his estranged wife Millicent and their five kids, although none of them are happy about his arrival. Meanwhile, Dorothy Jane is upset because Riley Roberts has graduated high school and gone off to college without telling her goodbye.
18	18	"The Egg and I"	Arlene Sanford	Philip LaZebnik	May 23, 1992	T-417	10.8
Dorothy Jane is less than thrilled when she is assigned to do a school assignment, which requires them to become "parents" to an egg, with Kirby Scroggins after her original assignment partner gets injured; the two teens eventually learn that parenthood is not all it's cracked up to be.
19	19	"It's My Party"	Robert Berlinger	Christopher Vane & Virginia K. Hegge	May 30, 1992	T-419	11.3
To try to become part of the popular crowd, Dorothy Jane decides to throw a party at her house to increase her social standing and invites almost everybody in the entire school to attend. However, Millicent is less than thrilled when she discovers that Dorothy Jane has left a new close friend of hers off the guest list, because she is not well liked by the invitees.
20	20	"Aunt Poison"	Arlene Sanford	Thomas Szollosi & Richard Christian Matheson	June 13, 1992	T-416	10.9
When Millicent's very eccentric aunt dies, she inherits her terribly sick hound dog, a valuable ring, an annoying riddle, and a weird painting. Millicent has some unanswered questions as to why her aunt had refused to speak to her for years and the reason why she was willed the items.

=== Season 2 (1993) ===
No. overall	No. in season	Title	Directed by	Written by	Original release date	Prod. code	Viewers (millions)
21	1	"New Moon"	Arlene Sanford	Michael Jacobs	February 6, 1993	201	11.7
Millicent is unable to keep making payments on the house and the family has to leave Pyramid Corners. Millicent accepts a job in Seattle as a nanny for widowed business man Brian Morgan's spoiled teenage children: son Gregory and daughter Molly. When the Torkelsons arrive at the Morgans, Brian's kids take an immediate dislike to the Torkelson family and devise a plan to send them packing back to Oklahoma with Molly trying to change Dorothy Jane's personality and Gregory making Mary Sue and Chuckie Lee his "slaves", but the plan backfires when Millicent finds out. Later, Millicent talks to Brian about his mistakes in fathering his kids, explaining that he had to take on the duties of running his wife's company after her death, spending little time with his kids because he is trying to work hard to make the business a success. Brian explains to his kids that he brought the Torkelsons into their home because they have had a very hard life and he wants his kids to learn about responsibility. Dorothy Jane learns of Molly's plan through a conversation with Millicent, and they both agree that Brian and his kids need some time to get adjusted to them.
22	2	"Girls and Boy"	Linda Day	Philip LaZebnik	February 13, 1993	205	9.9
Dorothy Jane enjoys her new job working at a local fast-food chicken joint, mainly because of her young, handsome supervisor Jeff (Joey Lawrence). After learning about Dorothy Jane's new love interest, Molly decides to work at the restaurant as well, something Dorothy Jane wishes not to happen. Meanwhile, Brian becomes too much to bear when he catches the flu and Millicent has to wait on him hand and foot.
23	3	"Sleeping with the Enemy"	Arlene Sanford	Lisa A. Bannick	February 20, 1993	203	10.0
Dorothy Jane is extremely horrified when she is informed that she must share a bedroom with Molly. Molly, on the other hand, is not the least bit concerned about the new living situation because she's too busy worrying about her father after catching him with a very attractive woman (Erin Gray).
24	4	"Is That All There Is?"	Bruce Bilson	Patricia Nardo	February 27, 1993	213	10.6
Dorothy Jane tries to tutor the top jock in her new school, Kevin Johnson (Ben Affleck), for a poetry assignment and the two start butting heads initially as he doesn't get the meaning of the poetry being taught to him. After she finally gets through to him, Kevin asks out plain Dorothy Jane, which ends up irritating Molly. Dorothy Jane sports her newfound popularity, but the relationship turns out to be pretty bland.
25	5	"The Fox and the Hound"	David Trainer	Wayne Lemon	March 6, 1993	208	8.4
When Brian's dinner date decides to cancel on him at the last minute, he asks Millicent to fill in for her since the client he is meeting feels that the man is only as good as the woman he has in his life, but Millicent ends up trying to fend off the client's advances. Meanwhile, Molly throws a party while Brian and Millicent are out of the house, and introduces Dorothy Jane to their school's football player (Jared Leto), but things come to a screeching halt when a boa constrictor Chuckie Lee brings home from school gets loose during the party.
26	6	"Winner Take Millicent"	Patrick Maloney	Wayne Lemon	March 20, 1993	210	11.6
Brian receives an unexpected visit from his younger hot-shot sports attorney brother, Jim (Christopher Rich), who decides to ask out Millicent on a date; when things soon heat up between them, the new love connection ends up leaving Brian out in the cold, but he will not admit that he has feelings for Millicent.
27	7	"To Jane Eyre is Human"	Patrick Maloney	Mark Lisson	March 27, 1993	212	11.2
Molly decides to plagiarize Dorothy Jane's old book report for Pride and Prejudice, instead of using it as a guide for her own report like Dorothy Jane had intended. After arguing with Molly about it, Dorothy Jane finds out the real reason why Molly ended up copying the report, that Brian is not pleased for her failing report card.
28	8	"Duelling Birthdays"	Arlene Sanford	Philip LaZebnik	April 3, 1993	204	11.9
Dorothy Jane and Molly's have a slight problem when their Sweet 16 birthday parties coincide on the same day as one another. Molly's is a backyard extravaganza, while Dorothy Jane's is a small indoor affair with only her family. Both girls end up longing to have the other one's party for very different reasons.
29	9	"To Date or Not to Date"	Arlene Sanford	Wayne Lemon	April 10, 1993	202	9.1
Millicent disapproves of Molly dating a college-age guy she has been secretly seeing, though Brian already gave his daughter approval to date him. This creates solidarity between Molly and Dorothy Jane, who sneak out of the house together late one night, so that Molly can see her older boyfriend.
30	10	"The Dance"	Linda Day	Mark Lisson	April 17, 1993	206	7.9
Gregory is in trouble when his tomboy friend Sam, whom he doesn't see as much of a girl, decides to transform herself into a beautiful young lady with Millcent's help and asks him to attend the Girls' Choice Dance with her. When the other boys at the dance notice Sam's new look, he suddenly becomes jealous and confides in his father that he has feelings for her. Meanwhile, Chuckie Lee becomes a magician with Mary Sue as his assistant, but he runs into trouble when he handcuffs Dorothy Jane and Molly together and Millicent has the key.
31	11	"You Ought to Be in Pictures"	Dennis Erdman	Lisa A. Bannick	April 24, 1993	207	8.4
Chuckie Lee poses for Brian's clothing catalog, and ends up loving the attention he gets from it. After a director sees his portfolio, Chuckie Lee is offered a role in a commercial. Millicent is not to thrilled with the idea of him doing the ad at first, but Brian convinces her it will be okay, and allows her son to do it. However, Chuckie Lee quickly realizes that working on a commercial is much different than print work.
32	12	"Hot Ticket"	Patrick Maloney	Philip LaZebnik	June 5, 1993	211	7.2
To prove to Samantha how much he cares about her, Gregory promises to get his girlfriend tickets to see rock star Tommy Tom in concert. After Molly and Dorothy Jane fail to get tickets themselves, he also promises to get Dorothy Jane, who has always wanted to go to a concert, tickets as well. The only way that Gregory can purchase the tickets is with a credit card, so he decides to use his father Brian's card to buy the tickets, but things do not turn out the way he planned when Brian finds out about the $300 charge. Meanwhile, Brian tries his hand (and fails) at cooking.
33	13	"Bowling for Daddies"	David Trainer	Lisa A. Bannick	June 12, 1993	209	7.0
Millicent decides to enter the father-son bowling tournament organized by Chuckie Lee's Wilderness Troop, so her son won't be left out. However, that is exactly what happens when Chuckie Lee sees all the other boys with their fathers.

== Syndication ==
The Disney Channel aired reruns of The Torkelsons and Almost Home on their weekday and weekend lineups from January 1994 to June 2000. All Disney Channel advertising for the shows packaged both seasons under The Torkelsons name, but when the Almost Home episodes aired in circulation, the title was never altered in the opening credits. The Disney Channel also aired the series' episodes in production order.

== Accolades ==
Year	Association	Category	Nominee	Result
1992	Young Artist Awards	Best New Family Television Series	The Torkelsons	Nominated
1992	Young Artist Awards	Best Young Actress Starring in a New Television Series	Olivia Burnette	Nominated
1992	Young Artist Awards	Exceptional Performance by a Young Actor Under Ten	Lee Norris	Nominated
1992	Young Artist Awards	Exceptional Performance by a Young Actress Under Ten	Rachel Duncan	Nominated
1993	Young Artist Awards	Best Young Actress Starring in a Television Series	Olivia Burnette	Nominated
1993	Young Artist Awards	Outstanding Actress Under Ten in a Television Series	Rachel Duncan	Nominated
