= Mt. Baldy League =

High school athletic league in California

The Mt. Baldy League is a high school athletic league that is part of the CIF Southern Section. Members are located in southwestern San Bernardino County, California.

== Members ==
- Diamond Bar High School -- Diamond Bar, California
- Chaffey High School -- Ontario
- Chino High School -- Chino
- Don Lugo High School -- Chino
- Montclair High School -- Montclair
- Ontario High School -- Ontario
