= Los Osos High School =

Location
- 6001 Milliken Avenue; Rancho Cucamonga, California 91737; United States; 34.14416°N 117.55736°W

Information
- Type: Public
- Established: August 2002
- School district: Chaffey Joint Union High School District
- Principal: Eric Cypher
- Teaching staff: 110.80 (FTE)
- Grades: 9–12
- Enrollment: 2,759 (2023–2024)
- Student to teacher ratio: 24.90
- Colors: Navy Blue; Carolina Blue; Vegas Gold; White
- Team name: Grizzlies
- Rival: Rancho Cucamonga High School
- Newspaper: The Grizzly Gazette
- Yearbook: Montivagus
- Website: Los Osos High School

Los Osos High School is a public high school located in the city of Rancho Cucamonga in Southern California's Inland Empire in the United States. It operates as part of the Chaffey Joint Union High School District. The school was named a California Distinguished School in 2013, was the recipient of a Golden Ribbon Award from the California Department of Education in 2017, and was a 2018 U.S. News & World Report Best High School Silver Medalist. Graduates from the Class of 2017 met the University of California A-G admission requirements at a rate of 66.4%, nearly 20% higher than the state average.

== Notable alumni ==
- Peter Avalon, All Elite Wrestling (AEW) professional wrestler
- Victor Bolden Jr., San Francisco 49ers wide receiver
- Richard Brehaut, UCLA quarterback
- Nichkhun Buck Horvejkul, entertainer, actor, model, and member of the popular South Korean boy band 2PM.
- Kevin Holland, UFC fighter
- Arelle Middleton, Paralympic athlete
- Ifeoma Onumonu, NJ/NY Gotham FC soccer player
- Andrew Vasquez, Major League Baseball (MLB) pitcher
- Addison Reed, Major League Baseball (MLB) pitcher
- Jordan Richard, basketball player
- Travis Tartamella, MLB catcher
- Kendall Williams, University of New Mexico starting point guard
- Tony Washington, Houston Texans linebacker
