= Ontario High School (California) =

Location
- 901 West Francis Street; Ontario, California 91762; 34°2′21.52″N 117°39′58.90″W

Information
- Principal: Larry Rook
- Teaching staff: 95.54 (FTE)
- Enrollment: 2,121 (2023–2024)
- Student to teacher ratio: 22.20
- Colors: Cardinal; Gold
- Athletics conference: Mt. Baldy League
- Nickname: [OHS]
- Team name: Jaguars
- Rival: Montclair High School (California)
- Website: Official website

Ontario High School is a high school in Ontario, California. It is one of the twelve schools in the Chaffey Joint Union High School District.

== History ==
In 1882, founders of the City of Ontario George and William Chaffey established the Chaffey College of Agriculture and an on-campus secondary school with assistance from the University of Southern California (USC). The local community was granted control of the secondary school in 1901 and named it Ontario High School. Ten years later, in 1911, the school was renamed to Chaffey High School.

In 1967, a campus 3 miles (4.8 km) south of Chaffey High School was named Ontario High School.

The Ontario Jaguars' rival school is the Chaffey Tigers; their annual football game is known as "The Cat Bowl".

In 2014 the school was remodeled to include a modernized campus, a new two story building with 32 classrooms, and, for the first time in 47 years, a football stadium known as "Jaguar Stadium".

The current principal is Larry Rook. OHS is currently the last high school with lockers in the Chaffey Joint Union High School District.

== Campus ==
Ontario High School was built on 40 acres (160,000 m^{2}) of land on the south side of Ontario, California. The campus has eight permanent classroom buildings, along with 34 portable classrooms, for a total of 110 separate classrooms, an auditorium, cafeteria and multi-purpose room, library, study room, gym, locker room facilities, two pools, and fine arts and vocational facilities. In 2014, an extensive modernization took place with the help of "Measure P", constructing a new campus, a 2 story building, solar panels in the parking lot, and a new stadium in which the school will be able to host its first home football games.

== Academics ==
Ontario High School follows a standard California high school curriculum as defined by the California Department of Education's High School Graduation Requirements and tests students with the Standardized Testing and Reporting (STAR) program and the California High School Exit Exam.

Students have the opportunity to earn college credit through College Board Advanced Placement (AP) courses. In addition, Ontario High School has many honors classes, supports the Gifted and Talented Education (GATE) program and the National Honor Society, and participates in the nationwide Renaissance program.

== Arts ==
Ontario High School supports a wide array of fine and performing arts including art, art history, music appreciation, drama, choir, dance, band, percussion, ceramics, and color guard classes.

=== Band, percussion, and color guard ===
Ontario High School's instrumentalists, percussionists, and color guard performers compete in the Southern California Judging Association (SCJA) circuit for marching season during the first three months of the academic year. For the remainder of the year the Color Guard competes as a "winter guard" against other guards while the instrument and percussion sections have their orchestral season. The band's major performances are the Holiday Showcase, Music Americana, and Pops! concerts. The Music Americana concert is unique because the band performs with the United States Marine Corps Band. The Color Guard also has several acts during the Holiday Showcase, the Pops! concerts, and their end of the year show, the Color Guard Spectacular. For most of its history, the marching season group was known as the Ontario High School Jaguar Band and Color Guard. They won many awards in band tournaments and marched in several parades throughout southern California. At a point between 2000 and 2008, the group was renamed the Ontario High School Pride.

On November 1, 2008 the Ontario High School Pride entered the Surf City Open marching competition and won the highest "sweepstakes" awards and an invitation to the 2nd Annual California State Championship. This is the first time in its history that the combined marching band, percussion, and color guard competed in a state level competition. On November 22, 2008 the Ontario High School Pride won the 5A Division of the California State Championships for their performance titled "The Lion King Goes Broadway" and became the 2008 Division 5A California State Champions.

=== Demographics ===
The Ontario High School student population is primarily Hispanic/Latino. Between 2005 and 2009, the number of students categorized as English Language Learners decreased slightly. During the same period came a sharp rise in the number of students participating in the Free/Reduced School Lunch program. This data is reported by the school district as part of their annual California Basic Educational Data System (CBEDS) submission. Enrollment figures are released annually by the California Department of Education.

==== 2009 ====
Student Enrollment: 2,841
Free/Reduced School Lunch: 55.9%
Socioeconomic Disadvantaged: 75.8%
English Language Learners: 26.4%
Census Characterization: Mid-size City
Ethnic Breakdown: (Note: According to Dave Johnston, the Director of Data Management and Programming at Educational Results Partnership, the 2009 ethnic breakdown for Ontario High School totals to 100.1% because of rounding errors to the nearest tenths place. This data is reported by the school district as part of their annual California Basic Educational Data System (CBEDS) submission. Enrollment figures are released annually by the California Department of Education at http://www.cde.ca.gov/ds/sd/cb/filescbedsopusa.asp)
American Indian/Alaskan Native: 0.2%
Asian: 2.4%
Pacific Islander: 0.4%
Filipino: 0.5%
Hispanic/Latino: 85.8%
African American: 4.2%
White: 6.1%
Other/Declined to State: 0.5%

==== 2005 ====
Student Enrollment: 2,591
Free/Reduced School Lunch: 17.3%
English Language Learners: 29.8%
Census Characterization: Mid-size City
Ethnic Breakdown:
American Indian/Alaskan Native: 0.3%
Asian: 2.7%
Pacific Islander: 0.3%
Filipino: 0.7%
Hispanic/Latino: 77.6%
African American: 7.6%
White: 10.7%
Other/Declined to State: 1.2%

== Notable faculty and alumni ==
- Ralph Deleon, convicted terrorist
- Victor Glover, NASA astronaut of the class of 2013 and Pilot on the first operational flight of the SpaceX Crew Dragon to the International Space Station and pilot of the 2026 Artemis II Moon mission
- Juan Roque, former football All American at Arizona State University as an offensive tackle, Outland Trophy and Lombardi Award finalist in 1996, All Pacific-10 Conference First Team 1995 and 1996, member of 11-0 1996 Team that played in the Rose Bowl on January 1, 1997, NFL football player with Detroit Lions 1997-1999, played for CFL with Toronto Argonauts in 2001, and Arizona State University Sports Hall of Fame Inductee in 2009.
- Mike Sweeney, former Major League Baseball player for the Kansas City Royals. Played for the 1991 varsity baseball team that won the CIF Southern Section state title with an undefeated 26-0 record.
