= Montclair High School (California) =

Public secondary school in Montclair, California, United States

Coordinates: 34.07264°N 117.702867°W

- 4725 Benito Street, Montclair, California, 91763

Information
- Type: Public
- Established: 1960
- School district: Chaffey Joint Union High School District
- Principal: Lino Gomez
- Teaching staff: 110.44 (FTE)
- Enrollment: 2,605 (2023–2024)
- Student to teacher ratio: 23.59
- Colors: Columbia Blue; Black
- Athletics conference: Mt. Baldy League
- Team name: Cavaliers
- Rivals: Ontario High School
- Newspaper: The Clarion (est. Sept. 1950)
- Yearbook: The Glaive

Montclair High School is a high school in Montclair, California. It is one of the twelve schools of the Chaffey Joint Union High School District. The school was a recipient of the Golden Ribbon Award from the California Department of Education in 2017 and a silver medalist for the U.S. News & World Report 2018 Best High Schools. Graduates from the Class of 2017 met the University of California A-G admission requirements at a rate of 51.4%, nearly 5% higher than the state average. The school received the California School Board Association's Golden Bell Award in 2017 for its Advancement Via Individual Determination (AVID) National Demonstration program.

== History ==
Montclair High School is one of the oldest schools in the district. The school opened in September 1959 as one of the most modern schools in the area. The campus had two swimming pools and each classroom had air conditioning. Montclair High School's first class graduated in June of the following year in 1960.
