= The Famous Teddy Z =

American television sitcom

- Genre: Sitcom
- Created by: Hugh Wilson
- Written by: Richard Dubin; Wayne Lemon; Sid O. Smith; Robert Wilcox; Hugh Wilson
- Directed by: Frank Bonner; Richard Dubin; Max Tash; Hugh Wilson
- Starring: Jon Cryer; Alex Rocco; Jane Sibbett; Milton Selzer; Josh Blake; Erica Yohn
- Theme music composer: Guy Moon; Stephanie Tyrell; Steve Tyrell
- Country of origin: United States
- Original language: English
- No. of seasons: 1
- No. of episodes: 20 (5 unaired)

Production
- Executive producer: Hugh Wilson
- Camera setup: Multi-camera
- Running time: 30 minutes
- Production companies: ELP Communications; Hugh Wilson Productions; Columbia Pictures Television

Original release
- Network: CBS
- Release: September 18, 1989 – May 12, 1990

The Famous Teddy Z is an American sitcom that was broadcast on CBS during the fall of 1989. The series was created by Hugh Wilson and inspired by the true story of Jay Kanter, who was a mailroom clerk at MCA and later became Marlon Brando's agent.

== Synopsis ==
The series starred Jon Cryer as Theodore "Teddy" Zakalokis, a young man working in a Hollywood talent agency in order to avoid being stuck in his Greek-American family's bakery. When Hollywood star Harland Keyvo (a caricature of Marlon Brando) meets Teddy Z, he is so impressed by his honesty that he makes him his new agent. The humor is derived from Teddy's innocent approach to the business, contrasted with the snake-like behavior of his fellow agents. The cast also included Jane Sibbett, Alex Rocco, Milton Selzer, Josh Blake, and Erica Yohn.

== Cast ==
- Jon Cryer as Theodore "Teddy" Zakalokis
- Alex Rocco as Albert "Al" T. Floss
- Josh Blake as Aristotle "Ari" Zakalokis
- Tom LaGrua as Richard "Richie" Herby
- Milton Selzer as Abe Werkfinder
- Jane Sibbett as Laurie Parr
- Erica Yohn as Deena Zakalokis

=== Recurring ===
- Dennis Lipscomb as Harland Keyvo
- Jack Armstrong as Marty Horn
- Barry Corbin as Zed Westhymer
- Tony Di Benedetto as Uncle Nikos
- Liz Torres as Aunt Angie

== Production ==
=== Music ===
The theme song was written by Guy Moon and Stephanie and Steve Tyrell. Steve Tyrell is also the singer.

=== Casting ===
When the series first went into production, Lainie Kazan was cast as Teddy's pushy mother, Deena Zakalokis. Kazan had appeared in the first six episodes and shot part of the seventh episode but was released from the series due to creative issues. Kazan reportedly sued the producers for $2 million over her dismissal. The role of Deena was promptly recast as Teddy's grandmother, with Erica Yohn being hired. Most of Kazan's scenes were reshot with Yohn before the show made its debut.

=== Murphy Brown crossover ===
Rocco's character, Al Floss, made a crossover appearance in the Murphy Brown season two episode "And the Whiner Is...", which originally aired on November 13, 1989. In the appearance Floss serves as an agent for several Murphy Brown characters.

== Episodes ==
No.	Title	Directed by	Written by	Original release date	Viewers (millions)
1	"Pilot"	Hugh Wilson	Hugh Wilson	September 18, 1989	22.2
Fresh from the army, Teddy gets a job in the mail-room of a talent agency. Through a fortuitous set of circumstances, he winds up picking up powerful but childish Hollywood actor Harland Keyvo. Teddy ends up reprimanding the actor, punching him, and securing a job as his agent. Guest appearances: Dennis Lipscomb as Harland Keyvo, Nick Segel as Marty Cane, Jack Armstrong as Marty Horn, Dennis Selberg as Senior Agent, Andrew Philpot as Al Floss' Secretary
2	"What's an Agent to Do?"	Richard Dubin	Hugh Wilson	September 25, 1989	19.9
On his first day as an agent, Teddy has no idea what to do. Meanwhile, Laurie resents being offered a position as Teddy's secretary. Guest appearances: Nick Segel as Marty Cane, Jack Armstrong as Marty Horn, Tony Di Benedetto as Uncle Nikos, Liz Georges as Secretary
3	"Bobby the Chimp"	Hugh Wilson	Hugh Wilson	October 2, 1989	17.6
Teddy fights for the rights of a simian TV star. Guest appearances: Barry Corbin as Zed Westhymer, Michael Lembeck as Lou Neffler, Bernie Hern as Sol Seberwitz, Andrew Philpot as Floss' Secretary, Beau the Chimp as Bobby, the Chimpanzee, Mary Hart as Herself
4	"Teddy Goes to Malibu"	Max Tash	Hugh Wilson	October 16, 1989	17.7
Intending only to water the plants, Teddy reluctantly brings his family along to a movie star's beach house. Guest appearances: Tony Di Benedetto as Uncle Nikos, Liz Torres as Angie, Frank Hamilton as Dave Bender, Paul Satterfield as Boyfriend, Kathy Bendett as Mrs. Herby, Al Puglies as Brother-in-Law, Maria Cavaini as Daughter, Davey Roberts as Anthony
5	"Teddy Makes $50,000... In One Day"	Richard Dubin	Richard Dubin	October 23, 1989	17.3
When he signs a contract to star in The Dark Closet, Harland finagles a fat bonus for Teddy, but he later decides he doesn't want to do the film. Guest appearances: Dennis Lipscomb as Harland Kevyo, Herb Edelman as Lassiter Fogel, Nick Segal as Marty Cane, Jack Armstrong as Marty Horn, Lisa Mende as Donna Ubet, Marc Silver as Bobby Stein, Allan David Fox as Marty Page, Charles Hayward as Lazlo Persich, Sheila Burke as Secretary
6	"Teddy Gets Fired"	Max Tash	Story by : Chuck Ross; Teleplay by : Bob Wilcox	October 30, 1989	16.2
Al pawns off a movie script onto Teddy, and the youngster is so captivated by it that he tries to get the film made -- which makes Al look like a fool. Note: The story was "Suggested by an Article by Chuck Ross." Mr. Ross slightly altered the script for Casablanca, submitted it to over 100 agents under its original title, "Everybody Comes to Rick's," and then he wrote about the reactions. Guest appearances: Dion Anderson as Derrick Galloway, Andrew Philpot as Floss' Secretary
7	"Baking with Esther Luna"	Richard Dubin	Richard Dubin	November 13, 1989	14.9
Al and Laurie are each miffed for different reasons when Teddy accompanies a screen siren home to bake cookies. Guest appearances: Susan Anton as Esther Luna, Niles Brewster as Man at Bar, R.J. Miller as Man, Lon Huber as Waiter, Erik Frederickson as Sommelier, Magda Harout as Woman, Loren Farmer as Ernie, Perla Walter as Chonita
8	"Teddy Sells His House"	Max Tash	Craig Nelson	November 20, 1989	14.6
Teddy looks into buying a house closer to work. Meanwhile, Al negotiates a contract for an actor whom he doesn't realize is deceased. Guest appearances: Alan Ruck as Sheldon Samms, Bibi Besch as Sunny Sonenberger-Langer, Reuven Bar-Yotum as Mr. Karakon, Andrew Philpot as Floss' Secretary
9	"A Case of Murder"	Frank Bonner	Wayne Lemon	November 27, 1989	13.9
Al bets Teddy his car that he can't pair his star clients, Harland Keyvo and Bobby, the Chimpanzee. Teddy pulls it off, Al renegs on the bet, and Harland becomes so upset about being upstaged by the chimp that he tries to murder it. Guest appearances: Dennis Lipscomb as Harland Keyvo, Barry Corbin as Zed Westheimer, Arthur Malet as The Archbishop, Charlie Stratton as Tony Hale, Beau the Chimp as Bobby, the Chimpanzee, Cindy Riegel as Tracy, Pat Crawford Brown as Mrs. O'Malley, Ricardo Gutierrez as Slate Man, Harry Stephens as Man
10	"Teddy Gets a House Guest"	Max Tash	Sid O. Smith	December 4, 1989	13.2
A pretentious actor comes to stay with Teddy's family to research his role as a Greek character. Guest appearances: John Terlesky as Ryan Lane, Liz Torres as Aunt Angie, Tony Di Bendetto as Uncle Nikos, George Wyner as Ray Jacoby
11	"Season's Greetings from Al Floss"	Max Tash	Hugh Wilson & Bob Wilcox	December 11, 1989	13.6
In this variation of A Christmas Carol, Al is met by a deceased business associate and three ghosts (who take the guises of Abe, Richie, and Teddy) -- but in the end, the despicable agent doesn't learn a thing. Guest appearances: Bill Macy as Murray Chekoff, Deborah Offner as Mrs. Floss, Johnny Pinto as Young Al Floss, Leilani Serelle as Blonde, Michelle Mathews as Secretary
12	"Grandma Goes to Work"	Hugh Wilson	Craig Nelson	December 25, 1989	14.5
After he gets his first big paycheck, Deena thinks Teddy is selling drugs, so he invites her to work, where she tries to poach one of Al's clients. Guest appearances: Terry Kiser as Freddy Montane, Tony Di Benedetto as Uncle Nikos
13	"Teddy Meets His Hero"	Max Tash	Richard Sanders & Marilynn Marko-Sanders	January 8, 1990	16.4
Teddy becomes an agent for Engineer Bob, an over-the-hill children's TV star, but the only job he can find is a personal appearance at the opening of his uncle's new restaurant. Guest appearances: Tony Di Benedetto as Uncle Nikos, Peter Hobbs as Engineer Bob, Joel Polis as Barry, Jeff Silverman as Mitch, Susan Bugg as Woman #2, Paul Brinegar as Lash Laramie, F. Richards Ford as Man #1, Harry Waters, Jr. as Man #2, Michelle Buffone as Woman #1, Davey Roberts as Anthony, Maria Cavaiani as Rose, Sue Carlton as Naomi
14	"Teddy Gets a Better Offer"	Ginger Grigg	Bob Wilcox	January 15, 1990	13.7
Harland pressures Teddy to take a position at a rival agency. Guest appearances: Dennis Lipscomb as Harland Keyvo, Kurtwood Smith as Mel Barrett, Gloria Dorson as June, John Fujioka as Chang
15	"Agent of the Year"	Max Tash	Craig Nelson	May 12, 1990	5.4
An obnoxious agent locks horns with Al and lures Laurie away. Guest appearances: Robin Riker as Eileen Meisner, Hy Anzell as Bobby, Phil Leeds as Alan, Sid Melton as Milt, Monty Ash as Norman, Manny Kleinmuntz as Morris, Andrew Philpot as Floss' Secretary,
16	"Teddy Goes to the Awards"	Max Tash	Sid O. Smith	Unaired	N/A
When Harland is nominated for an award, he sends Teddy to deliver a condescending acceptance speech. Guest appearances: Dennis Lipscomb as Harland Keyvo, Andrew Philpot as Floss' Secretary, Ken Hanes as Stage Manager, Katherine Van Loan as Bartender, Roy Summersett as Man, Rosanna Iverson as Woman #1, Elizabeth Maclellan as Woman #2, Kim Adams as Audrey Tudor
17	"How to Make a Television Show"	Frank Bonner	Wayne Lemon	Unaired	N/A
Teddy watches in astonishment as everyone adds their two cents to a TV show pitch and it morphs into something else entirely. Guest appearances: Barbara Tyson as Melissa Stone, Robert Prescott as Garrison McCall, Cristine Rose as J.C. Carr, Ben Slack as Arnie Geiger, Cynthia Stevenson as Ann Policy, Bruce Mahler as Earl, Will Leskin as Bob
18	"Al Tells the Truth"	Max Tash	Bob Wilcox	Unaired	N/A
Al takes Teddy out to lunch to teach him the sleazy ways of the business, which includes lying to protect a movie star who's facing assault charges. Guest appearances: Robert Culp as Gabe Strock, Danny Goldman as Leonard Dink, Michael Holden as Dennis, Danny Shock as Waiter, Robert Fran Telfer as Maitre d', Andrew Philpot as Floss' Secretary, Kelly Miller as Strock's Secretary
19	"Teddy's Big Date"	Max Tash	Wayne Lemon	Unaired	N/A
Laurie agrees to attend a movie screening with Teddy, but his dream date turns into a nightmarish double-date with her inebriated mother. Guest appearances: Janet Carroll as Fay Parr, Phil Brock as Maitre d', Hector Elias as Enrique, Larry Goodhue as Singing Waiter #1, Dalton Cathey as Singing Waiter #2
20	"Teddy Gets a Guru"	Max Tash	Sid O. Smith	Unaired	N/A
Loony new age movie star guru Donna Gates pursues Teddy for representation, so Al goes out of his way to impress her. Guest appearances: Bebe Neuwirth as Donna Gates, Kathe Mazur as Greta, David Knell as Barrett Tilman, Douglas Roberts as Paul Mullen, Margo Rose as Jane, Kavi Raz as Indian Waiter, Andrew Philpot as Floss' Secretary

== Reception ==
The series pilot was seen to be far stronger than subsequent episodes, but the series received two Primetime Emmy Award nominations, including one for the pilot, and for Alex Rocco, who won an Emmy as Best Supporting Actor in a Comedy Series, but low ratings led CBS to drop it with five episodes unaired. It was later run in its entirety on Comedy Central in 1993 with episodes introduced by Rocco, and by Trio as part of its Brilliant But Cancelled series.

== Awards and nominations ==
Year	Award	Result	Category	Recipient
1990	Emmy Awards	Nominated	Outstanding Writing in a Comedy Series	Hugh Wilson
1990	Emmy Awards	Nominated	Outstanding Guest Actress in a Comedy Series	Liz Torres
1990	Emmy Awards	Nominated	Outstanding Directing in a Comedy Series	Hugh Wilson (For pilot episode)
1990	Emmy Awards	Won	Outstanding Supporting Actor in a Comedy Series	Alex Rocco
