= Alta Loma School District =

School district in California, United States

Address
- 9390 Base Line Road Alta Loma, California, 91701; United States

District information
- Type: Public
- Grades: K–8
- NCES District ID: 0602160

Students and staff
- Students: 5,659
- Teachers: 228.5 (FTE)
- Staff: 284.47
- Student–teacher ratio: 24.77

Other information
- Website: www.alsd.k12.ca.us

Alta Loma School District is a K-8 school district in San Bernardino County, California that covers Rancho Cucamonga. It was established in 1885 and currently serves approximately 6,800 students. The district feeds into Chaffey Joint Union High School District.

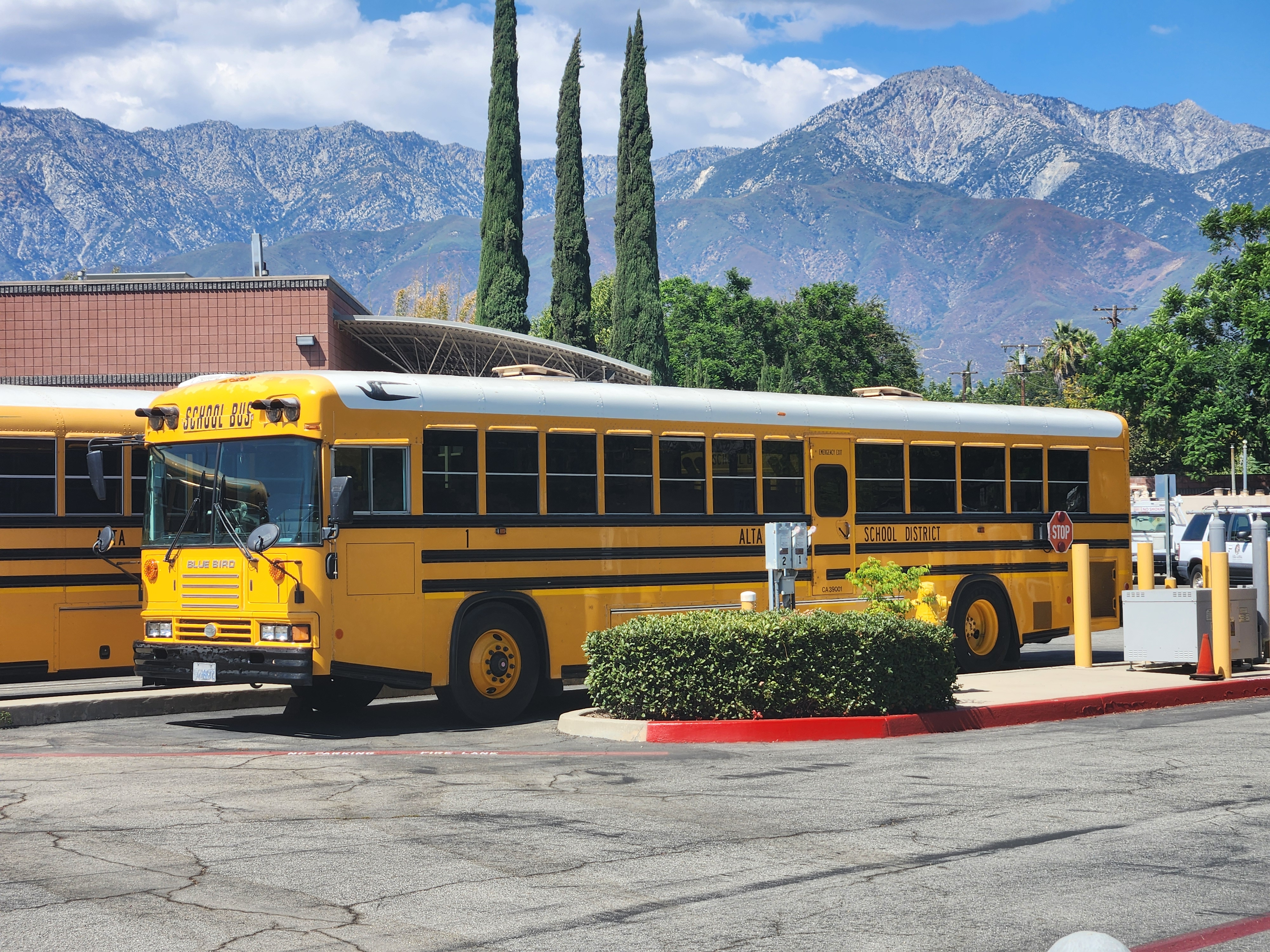
A prototype Blue Bird school bus owned by Alta Loma School District.

== Schools ==
=== Elementary schools ===
- Alta Loma Elementary School
- Banyan Elementary School
- Carnelian Elementary School
- Deer Canyon Elementary School
- Hermosa Elementary School
- Jasper Elementary School
- Stork Elementary School
- Victoria Groves Elementary School

=== Junior high schools ===
- Alta Loma Junior High School
- Vineyard Junior High School
