= Colony High School (California) =

Coordinates: 34.01706°N 117.569078°W

Location
- 3850 East Riverside Drive; Ontario, California 91761; United States

Information
- Type: Public secondary
- Motto: "Everything we do at Colony, we do with pride!"
- Established: 2002
- School district: Chaffey Joint Union High School District.
- Principal: Tiffany Bunn
- Teaching staff: 87.29 (FTE)
- Enrollment: 2,085 (2023–2024)
- Student to teacher ratio: 23.89
- Colors: Red; Blue; White
- Slogan: "Everything we do at Colony, we do with Pride!"
- Athletics conference: Palomares League
- Mascot: Tommy the Titan, Torro
- Team name: Titans
- Newspaper: Titan Tribune
- Yearbook: The Odyssey
- Website: cohs.cjuhsd.net

Colony High School is a high school located in Ontario, California, and is part of the Chaffey Joint Union High School District. The school serves the communities of southern Ontario, including the new Ontario Ranch community and portions of eastern Rancho Cucamonga and southeast Fontana. The school earned the 2018 Civic Learning Award for the State of California and was a 2018 Silver Medal winner for the U.S. News & World Report ranking of Best High Schools. Over 60 percent of the Colony High School Class of 2017 met the University of California A-G requirement rate, nearly 14 percent above the state average.

== History ==
When Colony High School opened in 2002, its first students and faculty were transfers from around the Chaffey Joint Union High School District.

Jim Brodie was the school's first principal. As of 2025, Tiffany Bunn is the principal.

== Campus ==
The Lewis Family Branch of the Ontario City Library is a shared facility found on campus.

== Academics ==
Colony High School follows a standard California high school curriculum as defined by the California Department of Education's High School Graduation Requirements and tests students with the Standardized Testing and Reporting (STAR) program and the California High School Exit Exam.

Colony High School offers students opportunities to earn college credit through College Board Advanced Placement (AP) and dual-credit courses. Dual-credit courses, are taken at Chaffey College in Rancho Cucamonga during the summer session and, if passed, qualify as credit for both high school graduation and college classes. In addition, Colony High School has the Gifted and Talented Education (GATE) program, honors classes, and participates in the nationwide Renaissance program.

The Class of 2006 recorded the highest pass rate for any AP test, receiving a 95% pass rate for the AP Calculus test under the instruction of Christopher W. Chang.

== Arts ==
Colony High School has a wide array of classes and clubs revolving around the arts: Art, Ceramics, Music Appreciation, Digital Media, Drama & Theatre, Choir, Dance, Marching Band, Jazz Band, Percussion, and Color Guard classes.

=== Band, percussion, and color guard ===
The Colony High School Titan Regiment consists of a band, percussion, and color guard. They compete in the California State Band Championships (CSBC) and the Southern California School Band and Orchestra Association (SCSBOA) circuits and host annual field tournaments.

==== Championship titles ====
- 2011: 1st place (2A)
- 2022: 1st place (3A CSBC); 1st place (Open Class State Finals for 1A/2A/3A) State Champions
- 2025: 1st place (4A CSBC); 1st place (Open Class State Finals for 4A/5A/6A) State Champions

=== Choir ===
- SCVA: Ranked Superior 2025-2026
- Oremor Christmas Competition 33rd annual- First Place

== Athletics ==
Colony High School's sports program includes baseball, basketball, cheer, cross country, football, golf, swimming, soccer, tennis, track, volleyball, water polo, softball, and wrestling, and cross country running.

=== Football ===
In the graduating class of 2007 there were several D-1 football players, including Omar Bolden (Arizona State University),

== Notable faculty and alumni ==
NFL players Bobby Wagner, Josh Andrews, Omar Bolden, Khalil Dorsey and Jaden Henley are Colony High School Alumni.
