= Thomas Graham Jr. (American football) =

American football player (born 1999)

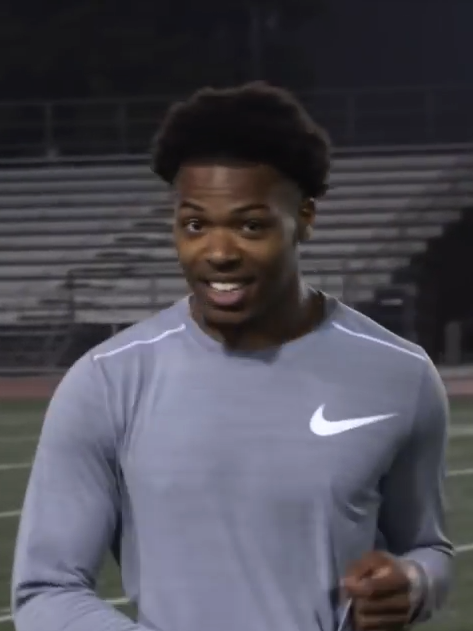
- Graham Jr. in 2018

Profile
- Position: Cornerback

Personal information
- Born: June 26, 1999 (age 27); Rancho Cucamonga, California, U.S.
- Listed height: 5 ft 10 in (1.78 m)
- Listed weight: 196 lb (89 kg)

Career information
- High school: Rancho Cucamonga
- College: Oregon (2017–2020)
- NFL draft: 2021: 6th round, 228th overall pick

Career history
- Chicago Bears (2021–2022); Cleveland Browns (2022–2023); Pittsburgh Steelers (2024); Baltimore Ravens (2025)*; BC Lions (2026)
- * Offseason or practice squad member only

Career NFL statistics
- Total tackles: 19
- Pass deflections: 4
- Stats at Pro Football Reference

Thomas Graham Jr. (born June 26, 1999) is an American professional football cornerback. He played college football at Oregon. He was selected by the Chicago Bears in the sixth round of the 2021 NFL draft.

== Early life ==
Graham Jr. is the son of Thomas Graham Sr. and Tamisha Graham. He initially attended Roosevelt High School in Corona, California, then transferred to Rancho Cucamonga High School in Rancho Cucamonga, California. He was recruited by multiple college football programs, including Notre Dame and Nebraska, before committing to USC in July 2015. The following summer, Graham Jr. de-committed from USC. In December 2016, Graham Jr. committed to Oregon through the efforts of that program's then-head coach, Willie Taggart.

== College career ==
As a freshman in 2017, Graham Jr. started 12 of the Ducks' 13 games, recording 49 solo tackles and three interceptions. In his 2018 sophomore season, he had 47 solo tackles and three interceptions. As a junior in 2019, he again had 47 solo tackles, along with two interceptions, one coming in the 2020 Rose Bowl. Overall at Oregon, Graham Jr. appeared in 40 games while registering 143 solo tackles, 39 assisted tackles, eight interceptions, and one forced fumble.

In September 2020, with the Pac-12 Conference football season seemingly canceled due to the COVID-19 pandemic, Graham Jr. opted out of his senior season with Oregon and declared for the 2021 NFL draft. In November, Graham Jr. accepted an invitation to play in the January 2021 edition of the Senior Bowl.

== Professional career ==
Pre-draft measurables
| Height | Weight | Arm length | Hand span | 40-yard dash | 10-yard split | 20-yard split | 20-yard shuttle | Three-cone drill | Vertical jump | Broad jump | Bench press |
|---|---|---|---|---|---|---|---|---|---|---|---|
| 5 ft 10 3/8 in (1.79 m) | 192 lb (87 kg) | 31 in (0.79 m) | 8 7/8 in (0.23 m) | 4.49 s | 1.61 s | 2.59 s | 4.19 s | 7.08 s | 34.5 in (0.88 m) | 10 ft 1 in (3.07 m) | 13 reps |
All values from Pro Day

=== Chicago Bears ===
Graham Jr. was selected by the Chicago Bears in the sixth round, 228th overall, of the 2021 NFL draft. On June 2, 2021, he signed his four-year rookie contract with Chicago. He was waived on August 31, 2021, and re-signed to the practice squad the next day. The Bears elevated Graham Jr. to their active roster after their secondary was depleted by injuries and COVID-19. Graham Jr. made his NFL debut on December 20 against the Minnesota Vikings. After playing every snap on defense with seven tackles and three pass breakups, he was signed to the active roster the next day.

On August 30, 2022, Graham Jr. was waived by the Bears and signed to the practice squad the next day.

=== Cleveland Browns ===
On September 13, 2022, Graham Jr. was signed by the Cleveland Browns off the Bears practice squad. He was waived on October 11 and re-signed to the practice squad. He was promoted back to the active roster on October 31, 2022.

On August 4, 2023, Graham Jr. was waived/injured by the Browns and placed on injured reserve. He was released on November 28, 2023.

=== Pittsburgh Steelers ===
On January 23, 2024, Graham Jr. signed a reserve/futures contract with the Pittsburgh Steelers. He was waived on August 27, and re-signed to the practice squad. He was released on October 29, 2024.

=== Baltimore Ravens ===
On August 18, 2025, Graham Jr. signed with the Baltimore Ravens. He was waived as part of final roster cuts and re-signed to the practice squad the next day. On September 3, 2025, Graham Jr. was waived from the Ravens' practice squad.

=== BC Lions ===
On September 21, 2026, Graham Jr. signed with the BC Lions of the Canadian Football League (CFL), and joined their practice roster. On September 24, 2026, Graham Jr. was promoted to the Lions' active roster. He was reassigned to the practice roster on October 10, 2026. On November 8, 2026, Graham Jr. became a free agent as his contract expired at the conclusion of the Lions' season.
