= Etiwanda High School =

Location
- 13500 Victoria Street; Rancho Cucamonga, California 91739; United States; 34°7′42″N 117°30′40″W

Information
- Type: Public
- Motto: Excellence in Education
- Established: 1900
- School district: Chaffey Joint Union High School District
- Principal: Mac Wolfe
- Teaching staff: 139.24 (FTE)
- Enrollment: 3,540 (2023–2024)
- Student to teacher ratio: 25.42
- Colors: Red; Gold; Black
- Athletics conference: Baseline League
- Team name: Eagles
- Rival: Rancho Cucamonga High School
- Newspaper: The Aquiline
- Yearbook: The Aquila
- Website: ehs.cjuhsd.net

Etiwanda High School is a public high school in Rancho Cucamonga, California, United States. It is one of the twelve schools of the Chaffey Joint Union High School District and serves students in the Etiwanda community on the northeast side of Rancho Cucamonga.

== Demographics ==
=== 2024–2025 school year ===
Student enrollment: 3540 students

Ethnic breakdown:

- American Indian/Alaskan Native: 0.2%
- Asian: 13.4%
- Pacific Islander: 0.5%
- Hispanic/Latino: 50.8%
- African American: 14.5%
- White: 15.1%
- Two or more races: 3.9%

== Notable alumni ==
- Mario Sanchez (1993) – soccer coach and former player
- Romel Beck (2003) – basketball player who played overseas
- Meagan Tandy (2003) – Miss California USA
- Matt Clark (2004) – former MLB first baseman
- Maurice Edu (2004) – former USMNT and MLS midfielder
- Jeff Ayres (2005) – former NBA player
- Darren Collison (2005)– former NBA player
- Tomi Favored (2005) – gospel singer
- René Rougeau (2005) – basketball player who plays overseas
- J. J. Unga (2005) – former NFL
- Nichkhun Horvejkul (2006 - transferred) – K-Pop artist
- Chris Barker (2008) – former NFL offensive lineman
- Marvin Jones (2008) – former NFL wide receiver
- Broderick Hunter (2009) – actor and model
- Michael Uzowuru (2009) – record producer
- Byron Wesley (2011) – basketball player who plays overseas
- Jordan McLaughlin (2014) – basketball player for the San Antonio Spurs
- Amy Okonkwo (2014) – basketball player who plays overseas and Olympian
- Kameron Edwards (2015) – basketball player and social media personality
- Kyle Isbel (2015) – outfielder for the Kansas City Royals
- Tyler Freeman (2017) – outfielder for the Colorado Rockies
- Alec Anderson (2018) – offensive lineman for the Buffalo Bills
- Kessler Edwards (2018) – basketball player for the Dallas Mavericks
- Elijah Harkless (2018) – basketball player for the Utah Jazz
- Jaylen Clark (2020) – basketball player for the Minnesota Timberwolves
- Jahmai Mashack (2021) – basketball player for the Memphis Grizzlies
- Andrei Fomenko (2021) – Harvard Philosophy PhD
