= Josh Andrews (American football) =

American football player (born 1991)

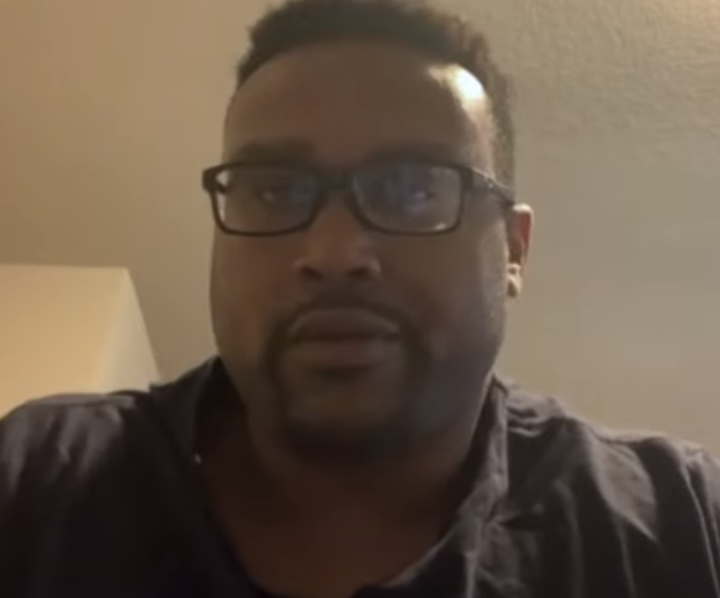
- Andrews in 2021

No. 68, 63
- Position: Offensive guard

Personal information
- Born: June 21, 1991 (age 35); Los Angeles, California, U.S.
- Listed height: 6 ft 2 in (1.88 m)
- Listed weight: 298 lb (135 kg)

Career information
- High school: Colony (Ontario, California)
- College: Oregon State (2009–2013)
- NFL draft: 2014: undrafted

Career history
- Philadelphia Eagles (2014–2017); Minnesota Vikings (2018)*; Philadelphia Eagles (2018)*; Indianapolis Colts (2018–2019); New York Jets (2020); Atlanta Falcons (2021); New Orleans Saints (2022); Philadelphia Eagles (2023)*
- * Offseason or practice squad member only

Awards and highlights
- Super Bowl champion (LII)

Career NFL statistics
- Games played: 48
- Games started: 9
- Stats at Pro Football Reference

Josh Andrews (born June 21, 1991) is an American former professional football player who was an offensive guard in the National Football League (NFL). He played college football for the Oregon State Beavers.

== College career ==
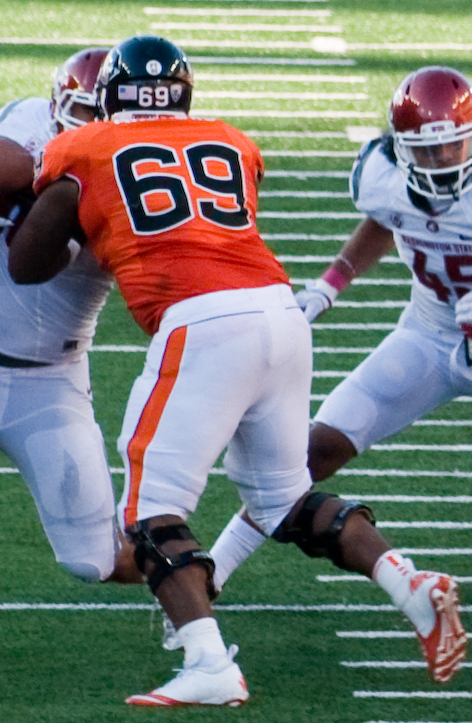
Andrews with Oregon State Beavers in 2012

Andrews played for the Oregon State Beavers, where he had 32 career starts at left guard. He played high school football at Colony High School in Ontario, California.

== Professional career ==
=== Philadelphia Eagles (first stint) ===
Andrews was signed by the Philadelphia Eagles in 2014 as an undrafted free agent. He was cut by the Eagles on August 30, 2014, and then signed to the practice squad on August 31, 2014.

On September 2, 2017, Andrews was waived by the Eagles and was signed to the practice squad the next day. Andrews remained on the Philadelphia practice squad through the 2017 season, which ended with the Eagles defeating the New England Patriots in Super Bowl LII.

=== Minnesota Vikings ===
On February 12, 2018, Andrews signed with the Minnesota Vikings. He was waived/injured on September 1, 2018, and was placed on injured reserve. He was released on September 7, 2018.

=== Philadelphia Eagles (second stint) ===
On September 25, 2018, the Philadelphia Eagles signed Andrews to their practice squad.

=== Indianapolis Colts ===
On November 20, 2018, Andrews was signed by the Indianapolis Colts off the Eagles practice squad.

=== New York Jets ===
On April 2, 2020, Andrews signed with the New York Jets. He was released during final roster cuts on September 5, 2020, but was re-signed two days later. On December 30, 2020, Andrews was placed on injured reserve. He started four games in 2020, his first starts of his career, including his last three at right guard.

=== Atlanta Falcons ===
On April 1, 2021, Andrews signed a one-year contract with the Atlanta Falcons. He suffered a broken hand in practice and was placed on injured reserve on September 1, 2021. He was activated on October 18.

=== New Orleans Saints ===
On May 18, 2022, Andrews signed with the New Orleans Saints. He was released on August 30, 2022, and signed to the practice squad the next day. He was promoted to the active roster on November 12. He was waived on December 12 and re-signed to the practice squad.

=== Philadelphia Eagles (third stint) ===
On August 6, 2023, Andrews signed with the Philadelphia Eagles. He was released on August 27, 2023, as part of final roster cuts before the start of the 2023 season.

== Personal life ==
Andrews is the son of Nate and Tanya Smith, he has two brothers, Darrell and Devin. He graduated from Oregon State University in December 2013 with a degree in sociology.

In 2020, Andrews stated in an interview that he has Narcolepsy, a neurological sleep disorder. For the NFL's 2020-2021 My Cause My Cleats initiative, Andrews chose Project Sleep as his organization to support.
