= Valley View High School (Ontario, California) =

Public secondary school in Ontario, California, United States

Coordinates: 34.085729°N 117.614567°W

- 1801 East Sixth Street, Ontario, California 91764

Information
- Type: Public secondary
- Established: 1973
- Principal: Julie Prestsater
- Teaching staff: 25.96 (FTE)
- Enrollment: 335 (2023–2024)
- Student to teacher ratio: 12.90
- Color
- Website: vvhs.cjuhsd.net

Valley View High School is a public secondary school in Ontario, California. It is one of the eleven schools of the Chaffey Joint Union High School District. Valley View is one of two continuation schools in the district and enrolls more than 500 students. Valley View High School was named a Model Continuation High School in 2018 by California State Superintendent of Public Instruction, Tom Torlakson. The school colors are green and gold.

== History ==
Valley View High School was opened in 1973. Starting the 2010–2011 school year, Canyon View High School merged with Valley View High School due to budget cuts.
