= Jermaine Brooks =

American football player (born 1979)

No. 92
- Position: Defensive tackle

Personal information
- Born: April 11, 1979 (age 47); Pasadena, California, U.S.
- Listed height: 6 ft 3 in (1.91 m)
- Listed weight: 285 lb (129 kg)

Career information
- High school: Rancho Cucamonga (Rancho Cucamonga, California)
- College: Arkansas
- NFL draft: 2003: undrafted

Career history
- Dallas Cowboys (2003–2004); Dallas Desperados (2007)

Career NFL statistics
- Games played: 1
- Stats at Pro Football Reference
- Stats at ArenaFan.com

Tommy Jermaine Brooks (born April 11, 1979) is an American former professional football player who was a defensive tackle in the National Football League (NFL) for the Dallas Cowboys. He also was a member of the Dallas Desperados in the Arena Football League (AFL). He played college football for the Arkansas Razorbacks.

== Early life ==
Brooks attended Rancho Cucamonga, where he played as a running back, before developing into a defensive tackle. As a senior, he recorded 80 tackles and 10 sacks. He received Parade All-American, All-state, All-conference and All-district honors. He finished his high school career with 350 tackles and 30 sacks.

He accepted a football scholarship from the University of Arkansas. As a true freshman, he tallied 6 tackles and one sack in 3 games, before suffering a season ending left knee injury. As a redshirt freshman, he was moved from defensive end to defensive tackle, posting 21 tackles and one sack in 10 games as a backup. As a sophomore, he appeared in 12 games, while collecting 24 tackles.

As a junior, he started 7 out of 11 games, registering 56 tackles (sixth on the team), 12 tackles for loss, 3.5 sacks (led the team), 2 quarterback pressures and 2 pass deflections. He had a career-high 11 tackles (5 for loss) and 2.5 sacks in the upset of 17th ranked Auburn University. He was named to the 2001-02 Southeastern Conference Football Academic Honor Roll.

As a senior, he missed spring practice while recovering from left shoulder surgery and was named one of the team's captains. He started 6 games, collecting 14 tackles (one for loss).

== Professional career ==
=== Dallas Cowboys ===
On October 27, 2003, Brooks was signed as an undrafted free agent by the Dallas Cowboys to the practice squad, reuniting with Kacy Rodgers who was his defensive line coach at Arkansas. On December 24, he was promoted to the active roster. He made his NFL debut in the season finale against the New Orleans Saints, making 3 tackles. He played in the playoffs against the Carolina Panthers, making one tackle.

He was released on September 5, 2004. He was signed to the practice squad on September 7. He was released on October 5 and later signed to the practice squad on November 3. He was signed on January 4, 2005. He was released on August 17.

=== Dallas Desperados (AFL) ===
On October 23, 2006, he signed with the Dallas Desperados of the Arena Football League, to play as a defensive tackle. On February 17, 2007, he was placed on the injured reserve list. On July 6, he was placed on the injured reserve list. He was released on January 30, 2008.
