= J. J. Unga =

American football player (born 1987)

J.J. Unga
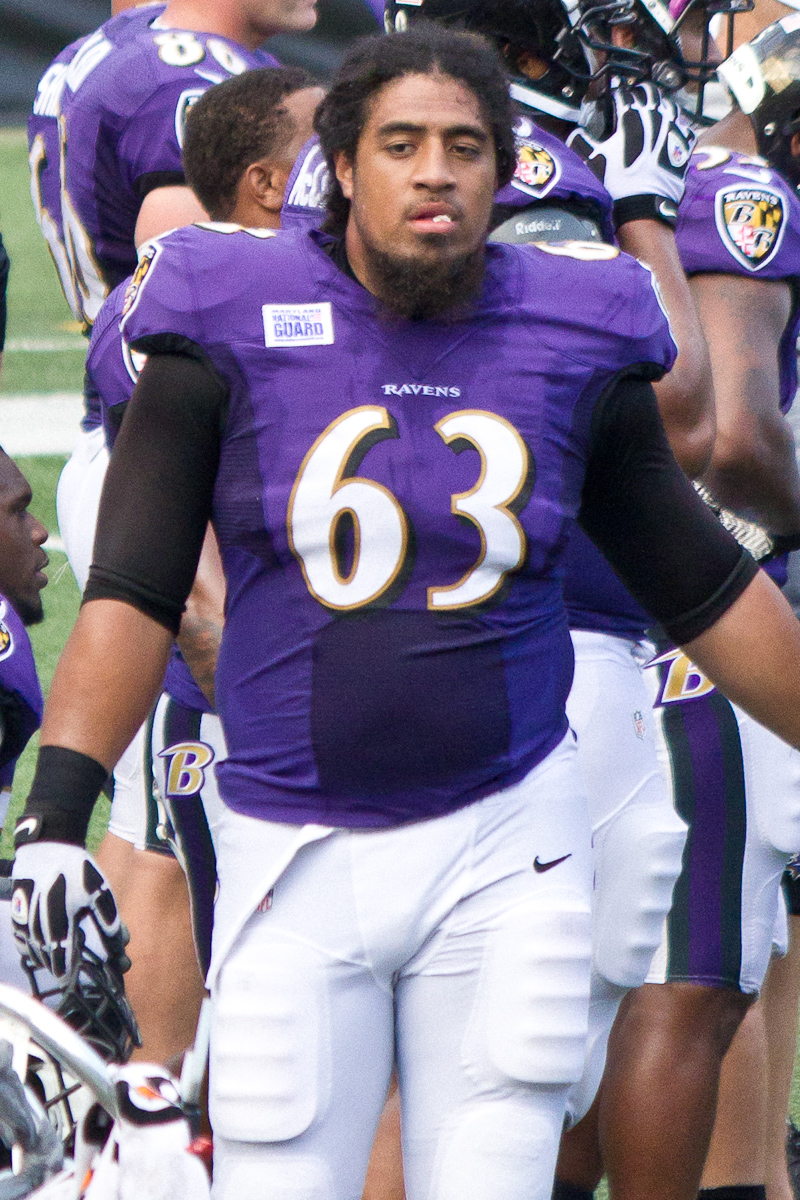
- Unga at Ravens M&T Bank Stadium practice in August 2013

No. 63, 64, 65
- Position: Offensive guard

Personal information
- Born: January 5, 1987 (age 39); Rochester, California, U.S.
- Listed height: 6 ft 6 in (1.98 m)
- Listed weight: 320 lb (145 kg)

Career information
- High school: Etiwanda (Rancho Cucamonga, California)
- College: Midwestern State
- NFL draft: 2013: undrafted

Career history
- Baltimore Ravens (2013)*; Buffalo Bills (2013); Baltimore Ravens (2014)*; Arizona Rattlers (2015)*; Los Angeles Kiss (2016); Tampa Bay Storm (2017)*
- * Offseason or practice squad member only

Career NFL statistics
- Games played: 3
- Stats at Pro Football Reference

Joseph J. Unga (born January 5, 1987) is an American former professional football player who was an offensive guard in the National Football League (NFL). He played college football at Mt. San Antonio College before transferring to the Midwestern State Mustangs program. He is the brother of former New York Giants linebacker Uani 'Unga and cousin of former running back Harvey Unga.

== College career ==
=== Mt. San Antonio College ===
He was selected to the California Community College Football Coaches' Association All-Region III first-team in his Sophomore season while playing for the Mt. SAC Mounties (Walnut, CA). He was selected to the JCFootball.com SoCal all-combine team also in his Sophomore season.

=== Midwestern State ===
At Midwestern State University, Unga was selected to the third-team Beyond Sports Network All-America team after gaining first-team All-Lone Star Conference accolades in his senior season.

== Professional career ==
=== Baltimore Ravens ===
On April 27, 2013, he signed with the Baltimore Ravens as an undrafted free agent.

=== Buffalo Bills ===
November 20, 2013, Unga was signed off of the Ravens practice squad after the Buffalo Bills released CB Justin Rogers. The Bills released Unga on August 25, 2014.

=== Arizona Rattlers ===
In November 2014, Unga was assigned to the Arizona Rattlers of the Arena Football League (AFL). On December 23, 2014, Unga was placed on the other league exempt list. On November 11, 2015, the Rattlers placed Unga on recallable reassignment.

=== Return to Baltimore ===
In December 2014, Unga re-signed with the Ravens to their practice squad.

=== Los Angeles KISS ===
On November 20, 2015, Unga was assigned to the Los Angeles KISS.

=== Tampa Bay Storm ===
On October 14, 2016, Unga was selected by the Tampa Bay Storm during the dispersal draft. He was placed on recallable reassignment on March 22, 2017.

== Personal life ==
His older brother Paul Unga was the defensive end at Arizona State in 2008-09. He also has twin brothers named Feti and Uani Unga. He is the cousin of former Philadelphia Eagles running back and return specialist Reno Mahe, who was named to the 2005 All-Pro team. His other cousin is Naufahu Tahi, who also played in the National Football League where he was a fullback. He played only for the Minnesota Vikings from 2006-2010.
