= Rancho Cucamonga High School =

Location
- 11801 Lark Drive; Rancho Cucamonga, California 91701; USA

Information
- Type: Public
- Established: August 1992
- School district: Chaffey Joint Union High School District
- Principal: Azande Aikens
- Teaching staff: 128.17 (FTE)
- Grades: 9–12
- Enrollment: 3,343 (2023–2024)
- Student to teacher ratio: 26.08
- Colors: Purple; Silver; Black
- Team name: Cougars
- Newspaper: The Cat's Eye
- Website: Official website

Rancho Cucamonga High School is a public high school in the city of Rancho Cucamonga in Southern California's Inland Empire. It is one of nine high schools in the Chaffey Joint Union High School District. Rancho Cucamonga High School opened in August 1992 with an enrollment of approximately 1,500 ninth to eleventh grade students. Today, RCHS has an enrollment of approximately 3,400 students in the 9th through 12th grades.

== Academics ==
In 1996 and in 2003, Rancho Cucamonga High School was honored as one of California's Distinguished Schools. In 1997 and in 2003, Rancho Cucamonga High School was accredited by WASC for 6 years. Rancho Cucamonga High School was honored in 1998 as a State of California nominee as a national Blue Ribbon School. In 1999, RCHS joined the ranks of California's digital high schools. It serves students from Ruth Musser, and Etiwanda District schools (primarily Etiwanda Intermediate). Rancho Cucamonga High School has been recognized as a Silver Medal School by U.S. News & World Report.

Rancho Cucamonga High School has posted an Academic Performance Index (API) rating of over 800 since the 2009-2010 school year, with a score of 839 in the 2011-2012 school year.

RCHS offers 18 Advanced Placement courses as of the 2018-2019 school year, with about 25% of the students taking one or more AP courses. RCHS also uses California Standardized Testing and Reporting, and supports the GATE program.

Until the 2008-2009 school year the school had an AFJROTC unit residing, CA-941. The RCHS AFJROTC won fourth place at the Fontana High School Drill meet.

The school's Academic Decathlon team has also been successful in recent years, qualifying for the California Academic Decathlon State Competition multiple times and placing fourth overall in 2019.

== Activities ==
The school has a number of varsity sports teams and performing arts programs, including Boys' and Girls' Basketball, Tennis, Baseball/Softball, Swimming, Water Polo, Track & Field, Cross Country, Soccer, Boys' Football, and Golf. Performing Arts include Drama, the Rancho Cucamonga Marching Cougars Marching Band, Jazz Band, Wind Ensemble, Concert Band, Symphonic Band, Drumline, Choir, Dance, and Color Guard.

RCHS also hosts an event for military veterans, called Rancho Remembers, which is held every April/May. The event, founded and organized in 2007 by three of the school's history teachers, Mr. Robert Sanchez, Mr. Aaron Bishop and Mr. James Longo, along with a number of students in a club of the same name, gathers a number of veterans in the school's gymnasium, who have the opportunity to share their stories and interact with the school's junior class in a formal setting, with lunch also being served at the event for the veterans and students. The event attracts a large number of veterans each year, with the 2013 event attracting 320 veterans. Rancho Remembers and its founders have received great praise from the veterans, and from local citizens and news outlets, for putting on such a special event that honors the veterans, and teaches the students in a memorable fashion.

== Athletics ==
Rancho Cucamonga High School competes in the Baseline League, including Chino Hills, Damien, Upland, Etiwanda, and Los Osos.

The Football team has produced a number of Division I FBS recruits, including 6 from the 2012 class alone. The school has been primarily noted for its production of standout defensive backs, with 3 of them going on to become 2nd round NFL draft picks. In 2016, construction of a brand new football and track stadium was completed allowing students to play games at home for the first time in the school's history. The school is also known for its traditional "Haka" dance, a cultural dance, that is performed after home games.

== Demographics ==
As of the 2018-19 school year, the ethnic breakdown of the students:

- 13.0% Black or African American
- 0.2% American Indian or Alaskan Native
- 9.7% Asian
- 3.9% Filipino
- 0.9% Hawaiian or Pacific Islander
- 44.6% Hispanic or Latino
- 22.3% White
- 5.0% Two or More Races

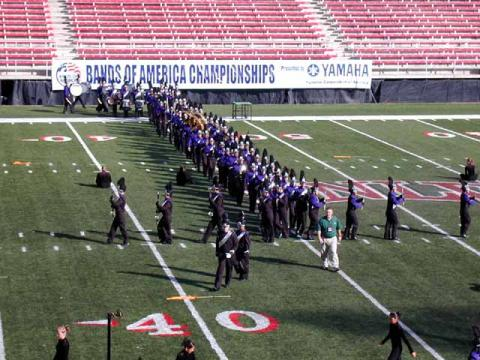
The Rancho Cucamonga Marching Cougars, 2014

== Future technology and upgrades ==
In accordance with the passage of California Proposition 30, and the passage of the local district initiative Measure P, both passed on November 6, 2012, Chaffey Joint Union High School District schools approved a large project to upgrade the high schools' facilities and technology. Rancho Cucamonga High School, as a result, received its own football and track facility, as well as new tennis courts, an auditorium, and a new classroom building. Other proposed upgrades include a parking structure, as well as renovated classrooms and other facilities. The stadium was completed in 2016. The school will also receive technological upgrades, as well as improvements to the school's energy efficiency and environmental efficiency systems.

== Notable alumni ==
- Gerald Alexander, former NFL safety
- Silas Bolden, college football wide receiver
- Matt Bradley, shooting guard for the San Diego State Aztecs
- Jermaine Brooks, former professional football player for the Dallas Cowboys, Oakland Raiders
- Vincent Brown, former NFL wide receiver
- Patrick Chung, former NFL safety for the New England Patriots and Philadelphia Eagles
- C. J. Culpepper, MLB pitcher
- Thomas Graham Jr., NFL cornerback for the Cleveland Browns
- Joshua Gray, college football offensive lineman for the Oregon State Beavers
- Darren Hall, NFL cornerback for the Atlanta Falcons
- John Holdzkom, baseball player
- Brenda Martinez, track and field athlete, competed in 1500M at 2016 Summer Olympics
- Mark Perry, NFL safety for the Miami Dolphins
- C. J. Stroud, NFL quarterback for the Houston Texans
- Randall Telfer, former professional football player for the Cleveland Browns
- Terrell Thomas, former NFL cornerback for the New York Giants
- Craig Lamar Traylor, actor, Malcolm in the Middle
- Deonce Terrell Whitaker, former CFL running back for the BC Lions, Montreal Alouettes, and Winnipeg Blue Bombers
- Trevor Penick, singer, O-Town
