= Cucamonga School District =

School district in California, United States

Address
- 8776 Archibald Avenue Rancho Cucamonga, California, 91730; United States

District information
- Type: Public
- Grades: K–8
- NCES District ID: 0616300

Students and staff
- Students: 2,359
- Teachers: 108.67
- Staff: 122.44
- Student–teacher ratio: 21.71

Other information
- Website: www.cuca.k12.ca.us

Cucamonga School District is K-8 a school district in San Bernardino County, California that covers parts of Rancho Cucamonga and Ontario. The district was established in 1870 and currently serves approximately 2900 students. The district feeds into Chaffey Joint Union High School District.

== Schools ==
=== Elementary schools ===
- Cucamonga Elementary School
- Los Amigos Elementary School
- The Ontario Center School

=== Middle school ===
- Rancho Cucamonga Middle School
