= Travis Tartamella =

American baseball player (born 1987)

- Catcher
- Born: December 17, 1987 (age 38); Fontana, California, U.S.
- Batted: Right Threw: Right

MLB debut
- September 23, 2015, for the St. Louis Cardinals

Last appearance
- October 2, 2015, for the St. Louis Cardinals

MLB statistics
- Batting average: .500
- Home runs: 0
- Runs batted in: 0
- Stats at Baseball Reference

Teams
- St. Louis Cardinals (2015)

Travis Scott Tartamella (born December 17, 1987) is an American former professional baseball catcher. He played in Major League Baseball (MLB) for the St. Louis Cardinals in 2015.

== Amateur career ==
Tartamella attended Los Osos High School in Rancho Cucamonga, California. He enrolled at Pepperdine University, and played college baseball for the Pepperdine Waves. After two seasons with Pepperdine, Tartamella transferred to California State University, Los Angeles, where he continued his college career with the Cal State Los Angeles Golden Eagles. In 2007 and 2008, he played collegiate summer baseball with the Orleans Cardinals of the Cape Cod Baseball League.

== Professional career ==
The St. Louis Cardinals selected Tartamella in the 19th round of the 2009 Major League Baseball draft. Baseball America rated him as the "Best Defensive Catcher" in the Cardinals minor league system in 2014.

On September 21, 2015, the Cardinals purchased Tartamella's contract, promoting him to the major leagues, following an injury to starting catcher Yadier Molina. Tartamella debuted in the eighth inning against the Cincinnati Reds on September 23 in a 10–2 win and singled on the first pitch of his first plate appearance. On November 2, Tartamella was removed from the 40-man roster and sent outright to the Triple–A Memphis Redbirds.

== Coaching career ==
On March 5, 2017, Tartamella was hired by the St. Louis Cardinals as a minor league catching instructor.
