= Ralph Deleon =

Filipino-American convicted of terrorism-related crimes

- Born: Ralph Kenneth Deleon; 1989 (age 36–37); Laguna, Philippines
- Citizenship: Philippines
- Education: Ontario High School; California State University, San Bernardino
- Convictions: Conspiracy to provide material support to terrorists Conspiracy to commit murder, kidnapping or maiming overseas Conspiracy to murder "officers and employees" of the United States
- Penalty: 300 months

Ralph Kenneth Deleon (born 1989) is a Filipino, and legal permanent resident of the United States, who in 2015 was convicted of conspiracy to commit murder of members of the United States military and government, and providing material support for terrorists. Deleon is serving a 25-year sentence.

== Early life ==
Deleon was born in Laguna, a province in the Philippines, and raised Catholic. In 2003, Deleon moved to the United States, and had resided in Ontario, California. In the United States, his father worked as an administrator at a care home. As a teenager he attended Ontario High School where he played football and was in the homecoming court. In 2010, Deleon converted to Islam; he began to attend a mosque in Pomona. Later he changed his Facebook profile to use an alias "Rafiq Abdul Raheem". He had previously attended California State University, San Bernardino and was studying business administration, but withdrew from the university in 2012.

== Terrorism involvement ==
Deleon listened to many hours of teachings of Anwar al-Awlaki. As early as May 2011, Deleon began to associate with other individuals on Facebook who were interested in mujahideen in Afghanistan. In July 2012, Deleon and two others were persuaded to join the Taliban, and later Al Qaeda, and began to train by playing paintball and firing AK-47s. Around this time Deleon visited his mother, who was living in Chicago; later an informant said this was Deleon's opportunity to say farewell to her. In addition, Deleon attempted to recruit to join his plot four other people, whom he called "potentials", but who did not join him. Deleon purchased airline tickets for three people for travel overseas. To pay for the trip, Deleon had quit college and sold his vehicle.

In November 2012, three people, including Deleon, were arrested while driving to Mexico, where they were to begin their flights to Afghanistan, where they had planned to conduct jihad, and become shaheed. In November 2012, three people, including Deleon, were charged in the United States District Court in Riverside. Another person connected to the plot was detained in Afghanistan; he was held as an enemy combatant before being sent to the United States to face prosecution. Multiple agencies were involved in the investigation which led to the arrest, including Riverside County Sheriff's Office, Riverside Police Department, San Bernardino County Sheriff's Department, Beaumont Police Department, Ontario Police Department, United States Immigration and Customs Enforcement, and the Federal Bureau of Investigation. Prosecutors later named the group the "Inland Empire Cell".

While in prison, an individual from the Philippine Consulate in Los Angeles visited Deleon to assess his well-being while in prison. At the time, Deleon was in solitary confinement. Lawyers for Deleon and the other men arrested with him said that after the Boston Marathon bombing, their clients faced additional challenges due to their similarities to the Tsarnaev brothers, and the widespread negative perceptions the general public holds against them. Prior to the trial, two individuals arrested with Deleon pleaded guilty to charges against them; they went on to cooperate with the prosecutors, and both received a lighter sentence than Deleon.

In December 2012, Deleon pleaded not guilty to the charges made against him. During the trial, an FBI paid informant took the witness stand for the prosecution, but not before the defense attorney representing Deleon attempted to intimidate him, according to the judge presiding over the trial. The Council on American-Islamic Relations questioned the use of informants in the prosecution's investigation of Deleon and others, claiming it can entrap suspects. In September 2014, a jury found Deleon guilty of three of five charges; one of the charges had a maximum sentence of life in prison. The two charges which the jury were hung on were:

providing material support to al Qaeda and conspiring to receive military training from al Qaeda.

Deleon's defense attorneys claimed he was a marijuana user who became entrapped by an FBI informant. In February 2015, Judge Virginia A. Phillips sentenced Deleon, and another conspirator, to 25 years in jail. In a letter to the court, Deleon wrote:

I have no excuse for my actions and believed I was following the correct version of Islam, which is extreme and radical.

Evidence which led to Deleon's conviction was released in January 2016. As of June 2016, Deleon's appeal is pending.

In early 2016, the FBI began to look into ties between the "Inland Empire Cell" and individuals connected to the 2015 San Bernardino attack. In late May 2016, the FBI accused Enrique Marquez Jr. of having ties with Deleon and others arrested with him, planning an attack on vehicles on California State Route 91, but stopping after Deleon and others were arrested. In August 2016, presidential candidate Donald Trump, referred to Deleon during a speech regarding immigration.
