= Richard Dubin =

American screenwriter

Richard Dubin is an American professor at Syracuse University.

== Biography ==
=== Early life ===
Richard Dubin grew up in the East Bronx.

=== Career ===
Dubin first worked in the music industry as a trumpet player, working alongside Otis Redding, The Crystals, Ray Charles, Lena Horne, Tony Bennett, Dizzy Gillespie, and Alvin and the Chipmunks. Dubin later moved into theatre performing in off-off-Broadway theatres such as Theater for the New City, Café Cino, and La Mama. Dubin co-founded JazzTheater Workshop and directed Bebop.

Dubin went into television production, working as producer, writer, and director for several television stations. Since 2000 Dubin has been a professor at the Newhouse School at Syracuse University.

== Personal life ==
Dubin lives in Ithaca, New York with his wife.

== Filmography ==
Writer

- The Good News
- Malcolm & Eddie
- Hangin' with Mr. Cooper
- Roc
- The Famous Teddy Z
- Frank's Place
- 101 Dalmatians: The Series

Director

- The Famous Teddy Z
- Doctor, Doctor
- Frank's Place

Producer

- Malcolm & Eddie
- Roc
- The Famous Teddy Z
- Frank's Place
