= Juan Roque =

American gridiron football player (born 1974)

No. 74, 73, 68
- Position: Offensive tackle

Personal information
- Born: February 6, 1974 (age 52); San Diego, California, U.S.
- Listed height: 6 ft 8 in (2.03 m)
- Listed weight: 332 lb (151 kg)

Career information
- High school: Ontario (CA)
- College: Arizona State
- NFL draft: 1997: 2nd round, 35th overall pick

Career history
- Detroit Lions (1997–1999); Toronto Argonauts (2001–2002)

Awards and highlights
- Consensus All-American (1996); 2× First-team All-Pac-10 (1995, 1996)

Career NFL statistics
- Games played: 17
- Games started: 3
- Stats at Pro Football Reference

Juan Armando Roque (born February 6, 1974) is an American former professional football player who was an offensive tackle in the National Football League (NFL) and Canadian Football League (CFL). He played college football for the Arizona State Sun Devils, and earned consensus All-American honors. A second-round pick in the 1997 NFL draft, he played professionally for the NFL's Detroit Lions and then the CFL's Toronto Argonauts. Roque was a color analyst for Fox Sports Arizona's broadcasts of Arizona State football games.

== Early life ==
Roque was born on February 6, 1974, in San Diego, California, to Armando and Maria Roque. Shortly after Juan's birth, Armando and Maria moved to the Roques' native Mexico, living in Coatzacoalcos, Veracruz. When Juan was three, the Roques returned to the United States and eventually resided in Ontario, California.

Roque attended Ontario High School and played on its offensive line. Coming out of high school, Roque was recruited by numerous colleges; these included USC and Washington State. Initially Roque verbally committed to USC but withdrew the commitment and decided to sign his letter of intent with Arizona State University to play for incoming head coach Bruce Snyder. Roque was initially recruited as a defensive lineman.

== College career ==
Roque attended Arizona State University, where he played for the Arizona State Sun Devils football team from 1992 to 1996. He was moved to offensive tackle and redshirted during the 1992 season. By his sophomore season, 1994, Roque had gained a starting spot for Arizona State at left guard.

In 1995 Roque was named an honorable mention preseason All-American by Street & Smith's. Following the season, he was named to the All-Pacific-10 Conference first-team and was a second-team All-American by The Sporting News.

Before the 1996 season Roque was considered as a contender for the Outland Trophy as best interior lineman in the country. In May 1996 Roque graduated from Arizona State, earning a Latin American history degree. Roque started all 11 games for the Sun Devils that season, helping the team go 11–0 in the regular season. Notable victories that season were a 19–0 upset of number one-ranked Nebraska, a come from behind victory over UCLA, a double overtime win against USC, and a 56–14 rout of the University of Arizona in Tucson. Arizona State won the Pacific-10 Conference championship for the second time in school history and earned a Rose Bowl berth with a 35–7 victory against California. Roque received numerous honors that year. He was a consensus first-team All-American, All-Pacific-10 Conference first-team member for the second year in a row, runner-up for the Lombardi Award, and an Outland Trophy finalist. Roque played in the Rose Bowl on January 1, 1997, against Ohio State University. The second-ranked Sun Devils, despite a strong effort by quarterback Jake Plummer, lost 20–17. After the college season ended, Roque was invited to participate in the 1997 NFL Combine in Indianapolis, Indiana, and did so.

== Professional career ==
During the 1997 NFL draft Roque was selected by the Detroit Lions in the second round (35th overall). During his rookie year Roque played in 13 games. Against the Chicago Bears on Thanksgiving Day, Roque received an opportunity to start. During the game, Roque suffered a serious left knee injury that sidelined him for the remainder of the season. Roque did not play in 1998 as he spent the entire year on injured reserve due to lingering effects from the knee injury.

In 1999 Roque earned a starting position at right tackle. He started the first two games and helped the Lions earn a 2–0 record. Roque did not see further playing time until the final two games of the regular season, but saw action against the Washington Redskins during a Wild Card playoff game in January 2000. Roque was released by the Lions before the 2000 season.

In 2001 Roque signed a contract to play for the Toronto Argonauts of the Canadian Football League. Listed as a defensive lineman, Roque played in seven games for the Argonauts in the 2002 CFL season before the team released him.

== Life after football ==
From 2007 to 2010 Roque worked as a color commentator for television broadcasts of Arizona State games on Fox Sports Arizona. On October 17, 2009, Roque was inducted into the Arizona State University Sports Hall of Fame. As of 2007, Roque resides in Chandler, Arizona, and is a legal administrator.
