= Chaffey High School =

Public high school in California, United States

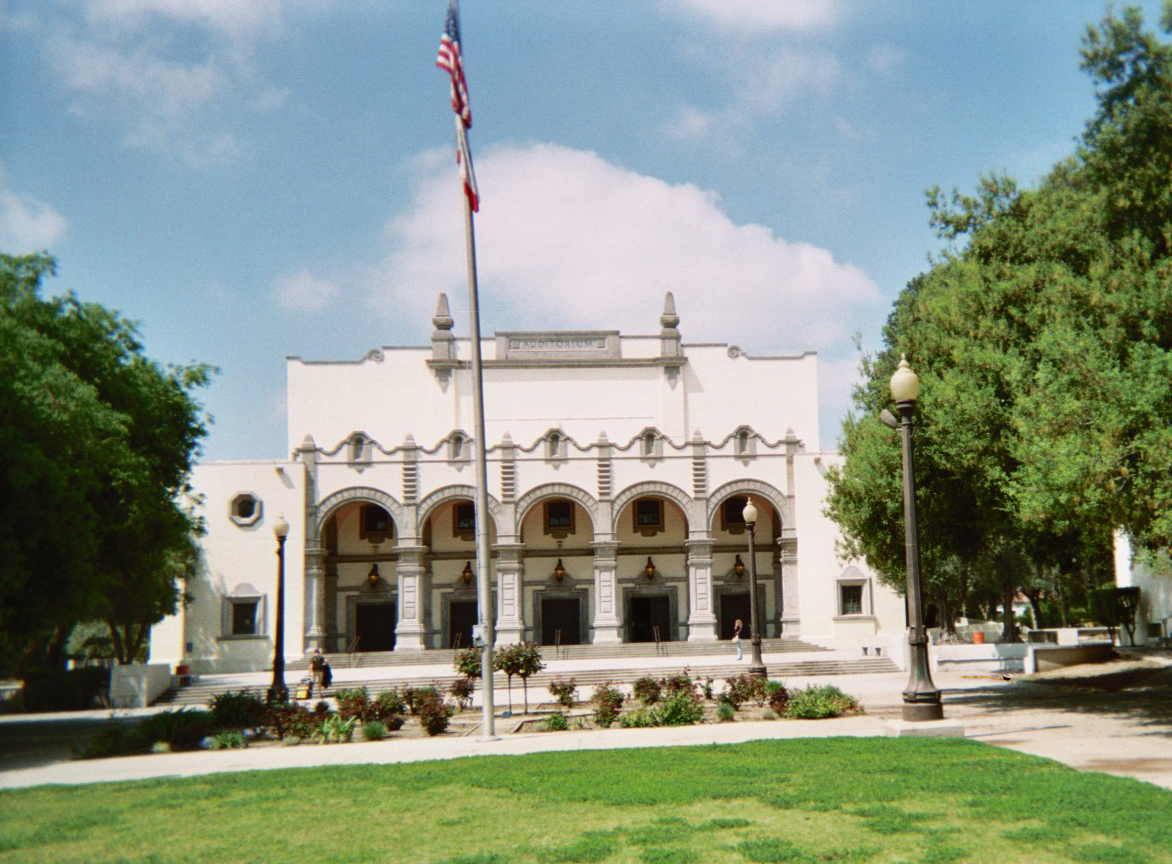

Location
- 1245 North Euclid Avenue; Ontario, California 91762; United States; 34°04′47″N 117°39′14″W

Information
- Type: Public high school
- Established: 1911
- School district: Chaffey Joint Union High School District
- NCES School ID: 060816000791
- Principal: Christina Martinez
- Teaching staff: 135.27 (FTE)
- Grades: 9–12
- Enrollment: 3,223 (2023–2024)
- Student to teacher ratio: 23.83
- Colors: Orange and Black
- Team name: Tigers
- Website: chs.cjuhsd.net

Chaffey High School is a public high school in Ontario, California, United States. It is part of the Chaffey Joint Union High School District and rests on approximately 65 acres (260,000 m^{2}), making it one of the largest high schools by area in California. The school currently serves northern Ontario and southern Rancho Cucamonga.

== History ==
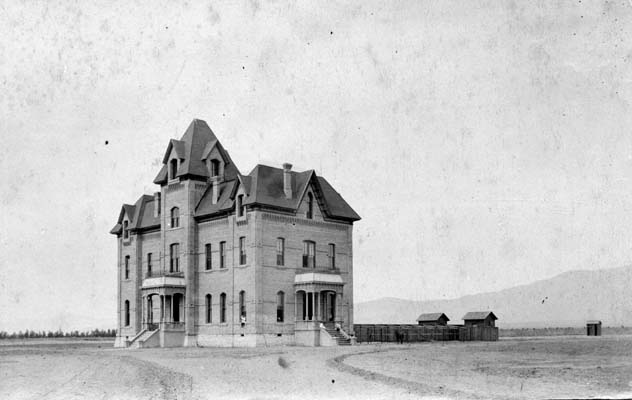
Chaffey College of Agriculture, 1885.

The Chaffey College of Agriculture, founded by the Ontario founders George and William Chaffey, opened on October 15, 1885. The institution, which also had a secondary school, was operated by the University of Southern California until 1901, when it came under the control of the local community and was renamed Ontario High School. In 1911, enrollment was opened to students from Upland and the school was renamed in honor of the Chaffey brothers. Almost all the high school-age students in western San Bernardino County attended Chaffey, a trend that continued until the 1950s. The school's buildings were rebuilt and many new ones were constructed during the government public works programs of the New Deal. Chaffey College continued to operate on the campus until 1960, when it was relocated to the nearby community of Alta Loma.

== Demographics ==
The demographic breakdown of the 3571 students enrolled for the 2012–2013 school year was:

- Male - 51.6%
- Female - 48.4%
- Native American/Alaskan - 0.2%
- Asian/Pacific islander - 2.2%
- Black - 2.6%
- Hispanic - 86.5%
- White - 6.8%
- Multiracial - 1.7%

In addition, 77.7% of the students were eligible for free or reduced lunch.

== Notable alumni ==
- Hobie Alter, surfing and sailing entrepreneur
- Jim Brulte, California Assemblymember
- Andrew J. Crevolin, thoroughbred trainer, winner of 1954 Kentucky Derby
- William De Los Santos, poet, screenwriter and movie director (enrolled as William "Billy" Hilbert)
- Bob Doll, professional basketball player
- Stewart Donaldson, author, positive psychologist, evaluation research scientist
- Bruce Grube, President, St. Cloud State University and Georgia Southern University.
- Jon Keyworth, professional American football player, Denver Broncos 1974-1980
- Nick Leyva, former professional baseball player, manager and coach
- Larry Maxie, former professional baseball player (Atlanta Braves)
- Lynn Montgomery, television producer and documentary filmmaker
- Vicki Morgan, American model murdered in 1983
- Anthony Muñoz, professional American football player, 1998 Pro Football Hall of Fame inductee
- Robert Lyn Nelson, artist
- Hal Reniff, former professional baseball player (New York Yankees, New York Mets)
- Robert Shaw, conductor
- Gary Wagner, disc jockey
- Joseph Wambaugh, fiction author
