= Mount Baldy, California =

Unincorporated community in California, United States

Mt Baldy, California
- Unincorporated community
- Location within the Los Angeles Metropolitan Area Location within the State of California Location within the contiguous United States
- Coordinates: 34°14′10″N 117°39′36″W
- Country: United States
- State: California
- County: San Bernardino; Los Angeles
- Elevation: 4,193 ft (1,278 m)
- Time zone: UTC-8 (Pacific (PST))
  - Summer (DST): UTC-7 (PDT)
- ZIP code: 91759
- Area code: 909
- GNIS feature ID: 1660300

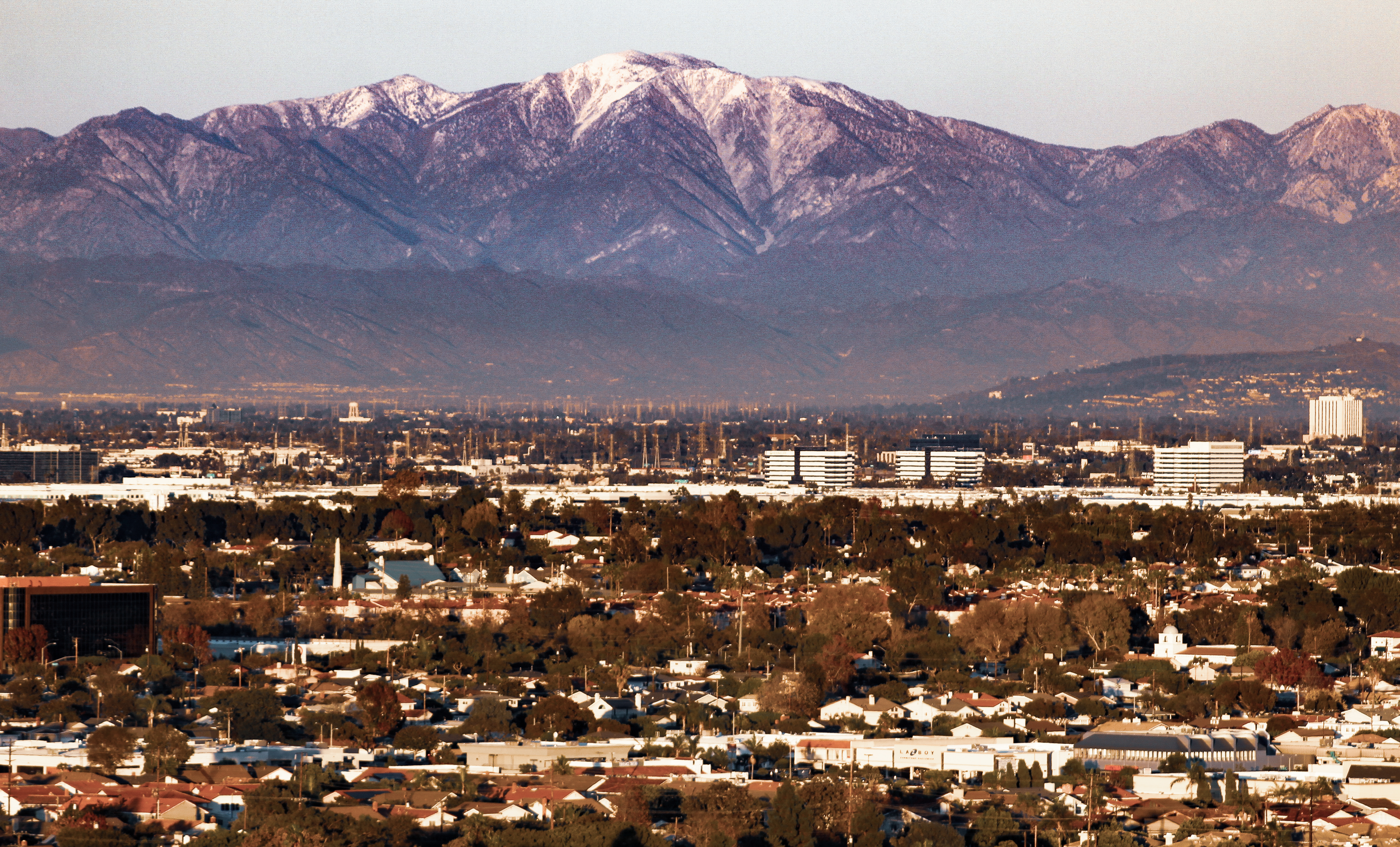
View of Mount Baldy and the San Gabriel Mountains looming over the Los Angeles Basin

Mount Baldy or Mount Baldy Village, formerly Camp Baynham and Camp Baldy, is an unincorporated community in the San Gabriel Mountains located in San Bernardino County and Los Angeles County in Southern California, with the county line running through the community. It is located below Mount San Antonio, commonly known as "Mount Baldy", hence its name.

== Geography ==
It is located below Mount San Antonio (Mt Baldy) in San Antonio Canyon. San Antonio Creek flows through the community. It is surrounded by the Angeles National Forest. Upland sits at the base of the mountains to the south, serving as the primary foothill community for the area, placing Mt Baldy approximately 12 miles (19 km) north of Ontario.

== History ==
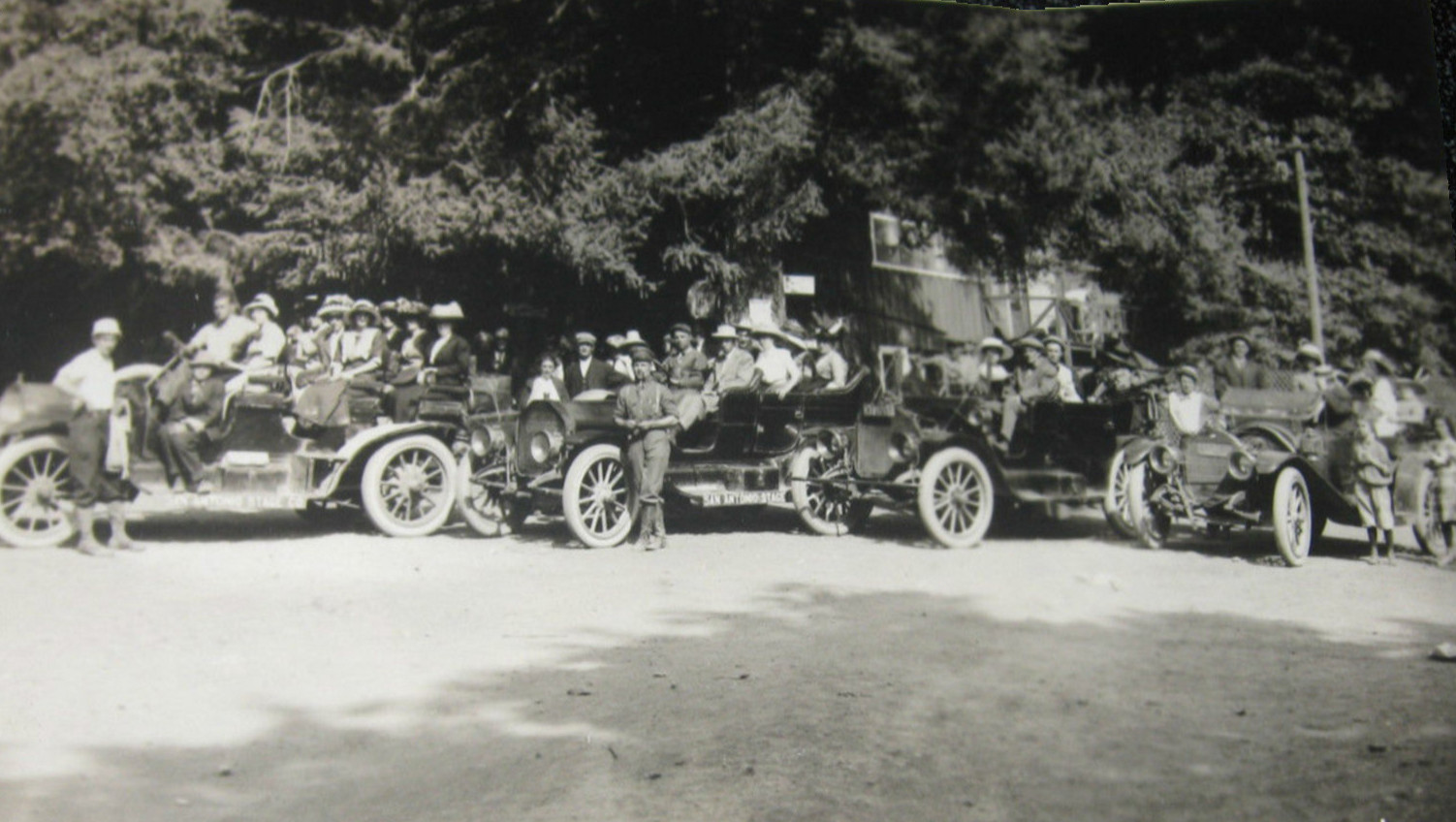
Motorists at Camp Baldy, 1919.

Around the turn of the twentieth century, when the Baldy Bowl was transitioning from resource extraction and toward recreation, a series of bitter conflicts took place there between the San Antonio Water Company and various camp owners. Pollution of the watershed and an 1899 brush fire led the company to wrest legal control of the road through the canyon away from Charles Baynham, close off the canyon with locked gates, and station armed guards to keep out intruders. But after some time and various legal battles, the company decided to profit from recreation rather than discouraging it. It bought Baynham's Camp in 1907 but then hired Baynham to manage it, charging tolls on the road from 1908 to 1922. The camp was renamed Camp Baldy in 1910, and in the following year the canyon became accessible by automobile. By the early 1920s there were numerous trail camps and resorts in the area. When the area became a national forest in 1908, the forest service began offering 99-year leases of plots of land, including at Camp Baldy.

During Prohibition, the area became known as a place where one could get a drink away from the watchful eyes of the police. Former Yosemite concessionaire Foster Curry (Curry Village), his wife Ruth Curry, and Ruth's second husband, movie star Edmund Burns, turned Camp Baldy into a playground for affluent residents of Los Angeles, with a swimming pool, casino, and a dance pavilion.

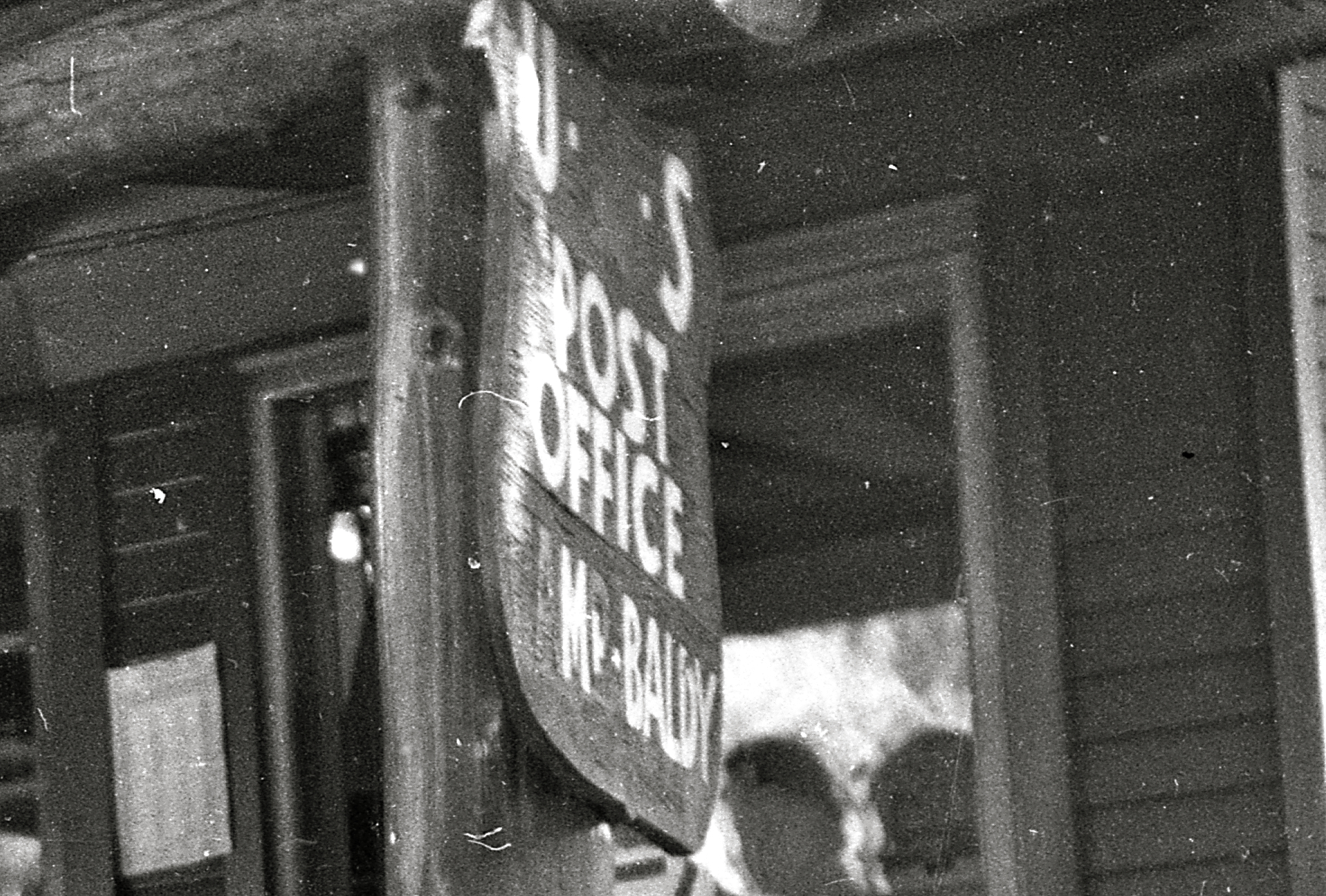
Mount Baldy post office sign, about 1953

The Los Angeles flood of 1938 destroyed most of the human-made structures in Camp Baldy. The casino was destroyed, but the hotel (today's Buckhorn Lodge) survived. Camp Baldy was rebuilt and later became Mt. Baldy Village.

== Buildings ==
Mt Baldy has a post office with ZIP code 91759. The community was established as Camp Baynham in 1906; it changed its name to Camp Baldy in 1910 and became Mt Baldy in 1951. Its post office was established in 1913.

The Mt Baldy School District operates the Mt Baldy School in town. The Mt Baldy Zen Center is located in the area.

The Mt Baldy Ski Lifts are located north of the town, on the slopes of Mt Baldy. The lifts are operated by the Mt Baldy Ski Resort, which has restaurants and lodging within the town. Mt. Baldy Road is the only road to reach the ski resort and other popular sites; as a result, the town is a highly visited area as tourists who plan on cycling or hiking within the valley, reaching the summit of Mt Baldy, or skiing, pass the town.

== Utilities and services ==
The town of Mount Baldy is served by privately owned utilities. Public services are by county and state governments.

Mt. Baldy is located in California's 8th congressional district, represented by Republican Jay Obernolte.

=== Electricity ===
- Southern California Edison

=== Cable TV and internet ===
- Charter Communications (Charter Spectrum)
- Frontier Communications

=== Natural gas ===
Gas is propane, as no natural gas lines are available.

=== Law enforcement ===
- San Bernardino County Sheriff
- Los Angeles County Sheriff

=== Fire ===
- San Bernardino County Fire Department
- Los Angeles County Fire Department

=== Schools ===
- Mount Baldy School District

=== Municipal governments ===
- Los Angeles County, California
- San Bernardino County, California

=== Roads ===
- Caltrans

== Climate ==
Mt Baldy has relatively cold and very wet winters with moderate snowfall. Temperatures often fall to 30 °F (−1 °C) at night. It is usually 39–49 °F (4–9 °C) during the day during the winter, and 25–35 °F at night. Annual snowfall is about 42 inches (110 cm). Summer temperatures are mild to warm, and can get chilly at night. Daytime temperatures are 76–86 °F (24–30 °C), with lows of 49–62 °F (9–17 °C). Thunderstorms are not common, on occasion they brew in the mountains in and surrounding Mt Baldy. They usually occur in the afternoon, and clear up by late evening.

Climate data for Mt. Baldy
| Month | Jan | Feb | Mar | Apr | May | Jun | Jul | Aug | Sep | Oct | Nov | Dec | Year |
|---|---|---|---|---|---|---|---|---|---|---|---|---|---|
| Mean daily maximum °F (°C) | 44 (7) | 45 (7) | 52 (11) | 59 (15) | 68 (20) | 76 (24) | 81 (27) | 81 (27) | 75 (24) | 63 (17) | 51 (11) | 44 (7) | 62 (16) |
| Mean daily minimum °F (°C) | 30 (−1) | 30 (−1) | 32 (0) | 36 (2) | 42 (6) | 49 (9) | 57 (14) | 57 (14) | 51 (11) | 42 (6) | 35 (2) | 30 (−1) | 41 (5) |
| Average precipitation inches (mm) | 8.20 (208) | 9.54 (242) | 6.08 (154) | 2.73 (69) | 1.00 (25) | 0.25 (6.4) | 0.10 (2.5) | 0.21 (5.3) | 0.69 (18) | 2.51 (64) | 3.41 (87) | 5.21 (132) | 40.83 (1,037) |
| Average snowfall inches (cm) | 15 (38) | 11 (28) | 8 (20) | 2 (5.1) | 0.2 (0.51) | 0.0 (0.0) | 0.0 (0.0) | 0.0 (0.0) | 0.0 (0.0) | 0.9 (2.3) | 3.3 (8.4) | 13.5 (34) | 41.9 (106) |

== See also ==
- Winfred J. Sanborn, pioneer
- Angeles National Forest topics
- San Gabriel Mountains National Monument
