= Mount Baldy School District =

School district in California

Coordinates: 34°13′54.60″N 117°39′44.88″W

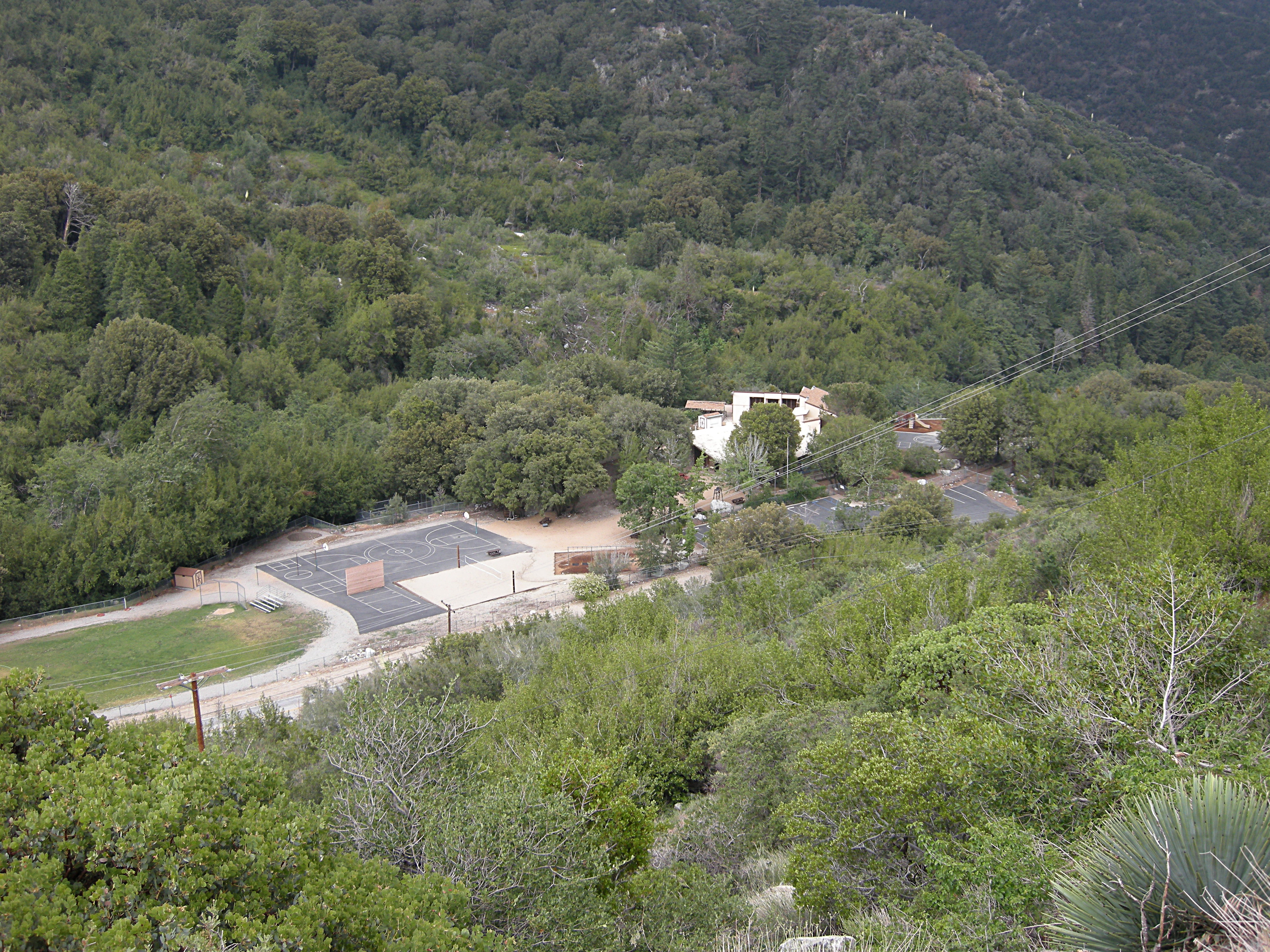
- Mt Baldy School from Glendora Ridge Road

Address
- 1 Mount Baldy Road Mount Baldy, California, 91759; United States

District information
- Type: Public
- Grades: K–8
- NCES District ID: 0626340

Students and staff
- Students: 87 (2020–2021)
- Teachers: 5.0 (FTE)
- Staff: 6.09 (FTE)
- Student–teacher ratio: 17.4:1

Other information
- Website: www.mtbaldy.k12.ca.us

The Mt Baldy School District consists of one school, Mt Baldy School, that serves students in grades K-8 in Mount Baldy, California, USA.

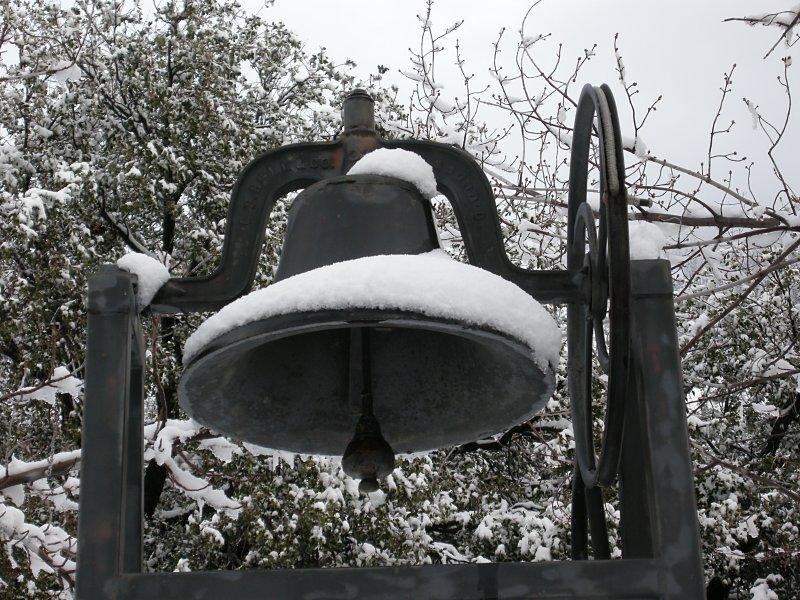
The school's bell with snow
