= Chaffey Adult School =

Public school in Ontario, California, US

Coordinates: 34.0810°N 117.6582°W

- 211 West Fifth Street, Ontario, California 91762

Information
- Type: Public secondary
- Principal: George Matamala
- Website: Chaffey Adult School

Chaffey Adult School is a public secondary school in Ontario, California. It is one of the eleven schools of the Chaffey Joint Union High School District and the only community day school.
