= Lynn Montgomery =

American filmmaker and writer

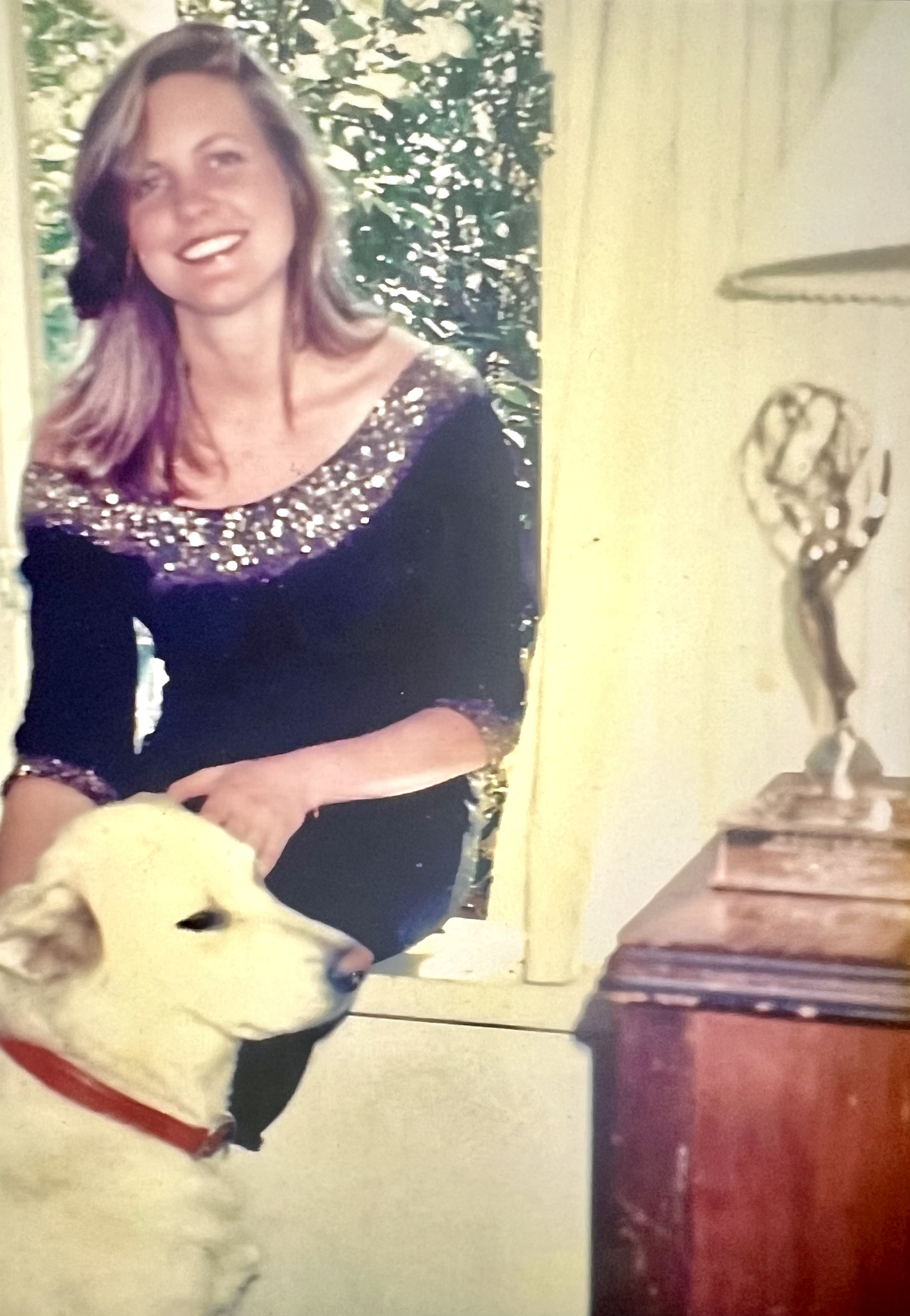
- Born: April 24, 1957 (age 67); Upland, California
- Education: University of California, Los Angeles (BA, 1978); Pacifica Graduate Institute
- Occupation: Filmmaker
- Years active: 1990-present
- Known for: Creator of The Torkelsons (1991–1993)

Lynn Montgomery is an American filmmaker who created the TV show, The Torkelsons (1991–1993). She also created and directed Amazing Grace, a documentary about Grace Fisher.

== Career ==
Montgomery created and wrote the sitcom, The Torkelsons and Mrs. Piggle-Wiggle. Her work on "The Radish Cure" episode of Mrs. Piggle-Wiggle earned her recognition at the 47th Writers Guild of America Awards. She directed Amazing Grace, a documentary that premiered at the Santa Barbara International Film Festival, showcasing the story of Grace Fisher.

== Personal life and awards ==
Montgomery's work in children's television earned her accolades from the Writers Guild of America, and she received an LA Emmy for her contributions to television writing. She is married to art director and visual effects artist, Richard Kriegler.
