= Bruce Grube =

Bruce F. Grube

11th President of Georgia Southern University
- In office July 1, 1999 – December 31, 2009
- Preceded by: Harry Carter
- Succeeded by: Brooks Keel

Personal details
- Spouse: Kathryn Grube

Dr. Bruce Grube was the eleventh President of Georgia Southern University, which is a Georgia Regional University located in Statesboro, Georgia, United States. He was president of the university from July 1, 1999, until December 31, 2009.

Grube has also served on the NCAA Executive Committee, as Chair of the NCAA Division I Presidential Advisory Group, and as Chair of the Council of Presidents of the Southern Conference.
