= California A-G requirements =

In California, the A-G requirements are standards for high school coursework required for admission to a University of California or California State University school.

The requirements consist of a C grade or better in the following subjects, identified by letter:

- (A) 2 years of History
- (B) 4 years of English
- (C) 3 years of Mathematics
- (D) 2 years of Science
- (E) 2 years of Foreign Language
- (F) 1 year of Visual or Performing Arts
- (G) 1 year of an elective, such as Computer Science, Economics, or Psychology

Some school districts require all students to meet the A-G standards in order to graduate, which are more demanding than the statewide minimum requirements for high school graduation. In 2023, a majority of California high-school graduates did not meet the A-G standards, making them ineligible for admission to state universities.
