= Wayne Lemon =

American playwright and screenwriter

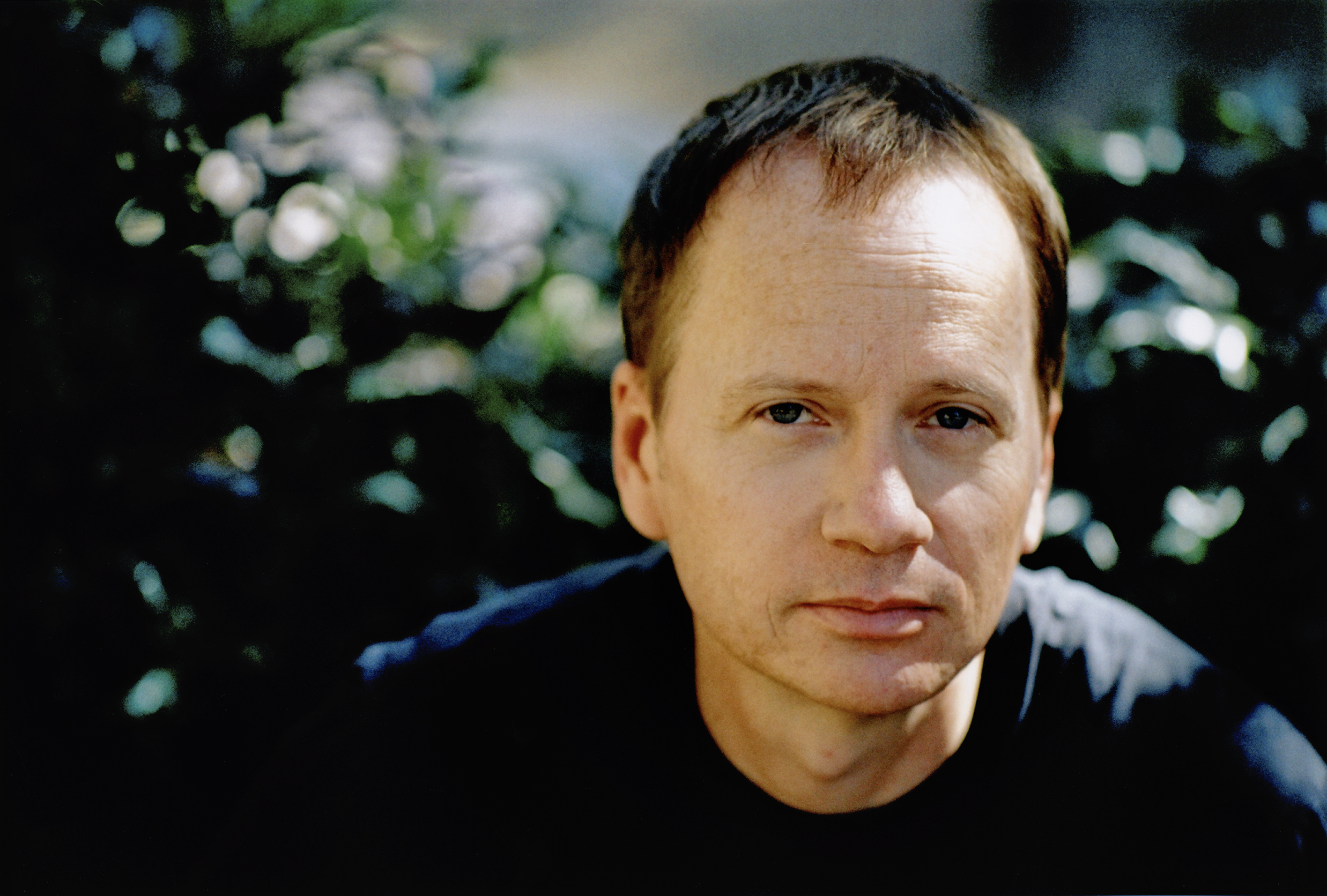
Wayne Lemon

Wayne Lemon is an American playwright and screenwriter.

== Career ==
Lemon's theatrical work has been performed by Steppenwolf Theatre Company, South Coast Repertory, Hartford Stage and The Denver Centre for the Performing Arts, among others.

His plays have been featured in Hartford Stage's Brand: NEW Fall Festival of Plays, Horizon Theatre Company's New South Playworks, New Haarlem Arts Theatre's Unheard Voices for the American Theater, the Alabama Shakespeare Festival's Southern Writers' Project and the American National Theatre. His darkly comic work Jesus Hates Me was chosen as the inaugural production of the Denver Center Theatre Company's New Play Summit.

Lemon began his career as a film and theatre critic for the Austin Chronicle. Lemon has been a guest lecturer at The University of Michigan, The University of Georgia, Marquette University, George Washington University, Texas Tech University and the University of Texas. He has served as playwright in residence at theaters across America.

Other theatrical works include 8 feet of water, Drive By and Buddy Sharp. His stage work has been published by Smith & Krause, New York, as part of their Best New Playwrights series, as well as their Comedy Monologue series. Lemon has been a repeat participant in Denver Center's Playwright Slam, reading new material aloud for attendees of the New Play Summit.

Lemon currently writes for the motion picture industry in Los Angeles. Recent projects include Master Thieves (based on the book by Stephen Kurkjian) and The Presidents Club (based on the book by Nancy Gibbs and Michael Duffy) for Sony Pictures Entertainment with Matt Tolmach producing.

Lemon's debut screenplay, The Havana Affair, was named to the industry's 2015 Hit List as well as 2016's Young & Hungry List before being set up at Leonardo DiCaprio's Appian Way in association with Tobey Maguire's Material Pictures.

When not writing, Lemon competes in the Pro-Am division of the National Cutting Horse Association aboard his American Quarter Horse, Glo Doc, and his American Paint Horse, Crimson Coco Chex.

=== Critical response to Jesus Hates Me ===
Lemon has hit upon a genre as irreverent and at times as profane as rap, yet filled with pertinent issues and rebellious politics.--Variety

[This] irreverent dramedy about the search for meaning may offend as often as it convulses. Lemon's narrative is both wildly inappropriate and keenly idiomatic. There's a compassionate point beneath its quirky corrosion.--Los Angeles Times

Lemon is a keen observer of human flaws and frailties, skillfully merging dozens of minute details to form a seriocomic mosaic. Up close, much of it is pointedly funny. From a distance, it's sickly-sad.--Orange County Register

Though Jesus Hates Me does have its occasional sweet moments, it's the acidic ones that make it such a treat.--StageSceneLA

Jesus Hates Me questions faith by confronting social taboos, everything from racism to blasphemy, fraud to adultery, suicide to incest — all through a lens of dark humor.--San Diego Reader

"Jesus Hates Me" can best be described as Jean Paul Satre's "No Exit" hopped up on booze, drugs, sex and a plate of Texas BBQ.--Broadway World

Jesus Hates Me is a character study, a comedy, a dramatic statement, a fleeting discourse on religion, an exploration of belief, a brief treatise on predestination versus self-determination and a whole lot of fun. It is alive as few plays are.--Centerstage

"This irreverent take on the search for meaning is hilarious, poignant, heartfelt, and a deeply vivid portrait of lives teetering on the edge of something big."--KPBS Arts

"Jesus Hates Me" will have you doubled-over with laughter at what you're watching while cringing inside by what it actually means."--Stage Happenings

Lemon's comic touch is razor sharp.--San Diego Union-Tribune
