= Homestead Valley, California =

Homestead Valley, California may refer to:

- Homestead Valley, Marin County, California, an unincorporated community
- Homestead Valley, San Bernardino County, California, a census-designated place
