= Ontario-Montclair School District =

School district in San Bernardino County, California

Address
- 950 West D Street Ontario, California, 91762; United States

District information
- Type: Public
- Grades: K–8
- NCES District ID: 0628470

Students and staff
- Students: 19,286 (2020–2021)
- Teachers: 861.61 (FTE)
- Staff: 1,168.01 (FTE)
- Student–teacher ratio: 22.38:1

Other information
- Website: www.omsd.net

Ontario-Montclair School District is a K-8 school district in San Bernardino County, California that covers all of Montclair, the unincorporated community of Narod, and a large portion of Ontario. Founded in 1884, the district now educates about 24,000 students and sends its graduates on to the Chaffey Joint Union High School District.

== Schools ==
=== Elementary schools ===
- Arroyo Elementary School
- Berlyn Elementary School
- Bon View Elementary School
- Buena Vista Elementary School
- Central Language Academy
- Corona Elementary School
- Del Norte Elementary School
- Edison Elementary School
- El Camino Elementary School
- Elderberry Elementary School
- Euclid Elementary School
- Hawthorne Elementary School
- Haynes Elementary School
- Howard Elementary School
- Kingsley Elementary School
- Lehigh Elementary School
- Lincoln Elementary School
- Linda Vista Elementary School
- Mariposa Elementary School
- Mission Elementary School
- Montera Elementary School
- Monte Vista Elementary School
- Ramona Elementary School
- Sultana Elementary School
- Vineyard Elementary School
- Vista Grande Elementary School

=== Middle schools ===
- De Anza Middle School
- Oaks Middle School
- Serrano Middle School
- Vernon Middle School
- Vina Danks Middle School
- Wiltsey Middle School
