= San Bernardino County, California =

County in California, United States

Coordinates: 34.83°N 116.19°W

San Bernardino County
- County
- County of San Bernardino
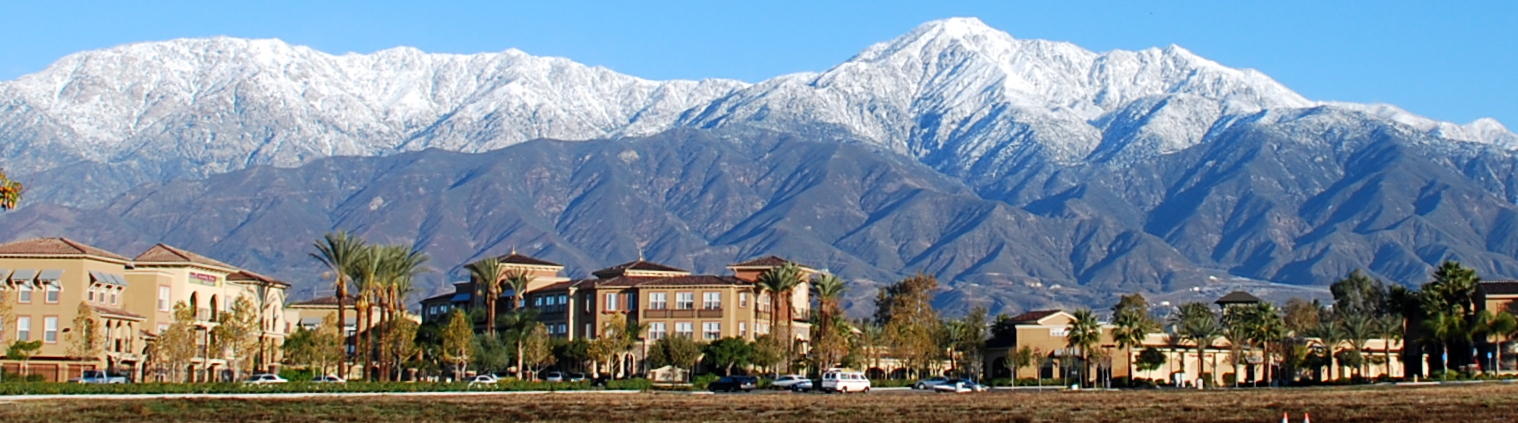
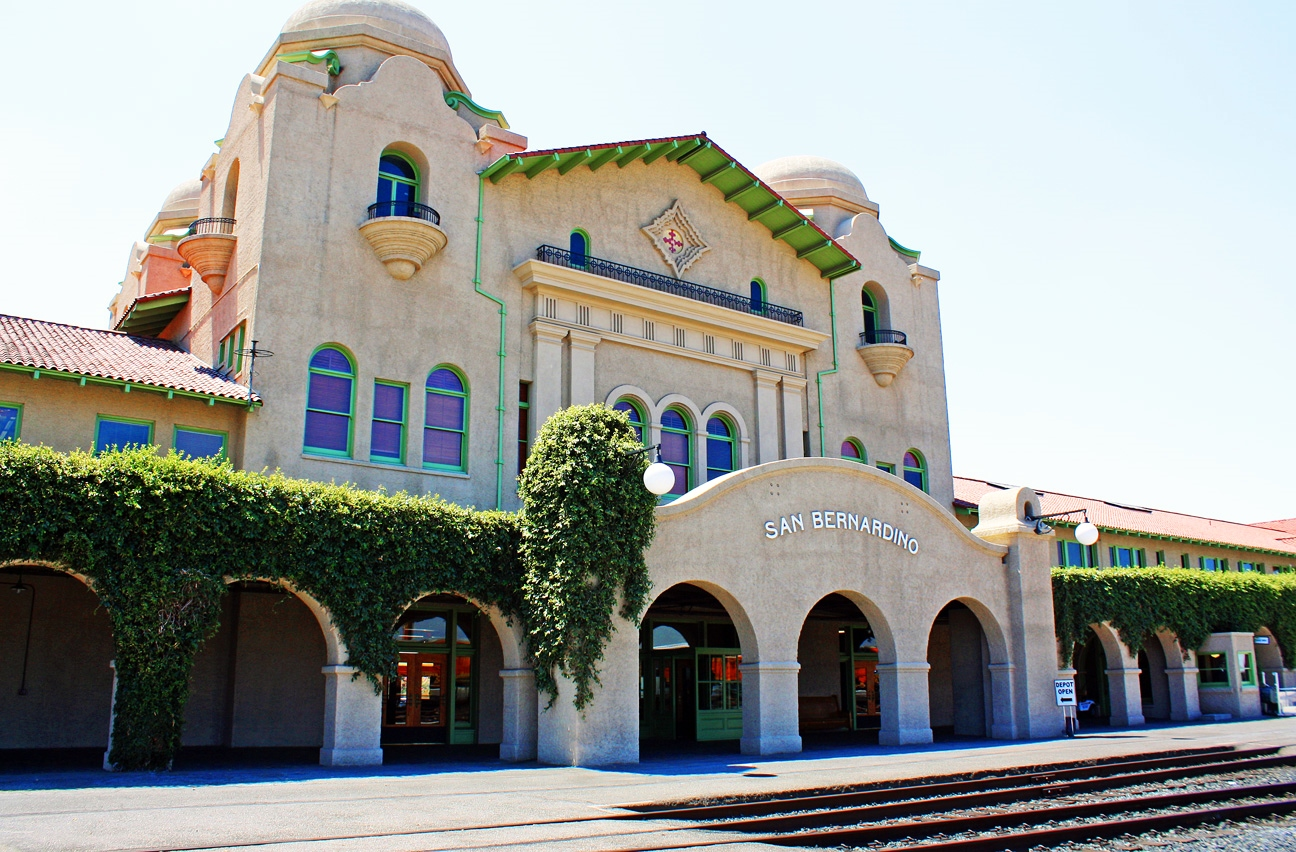
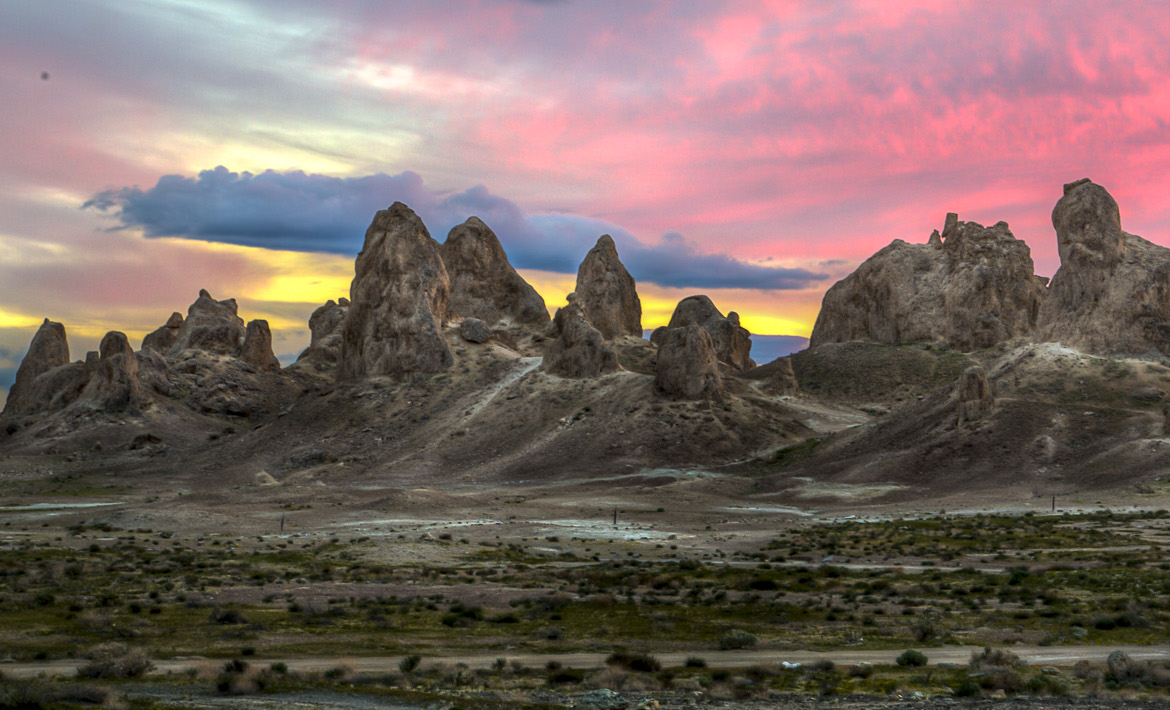
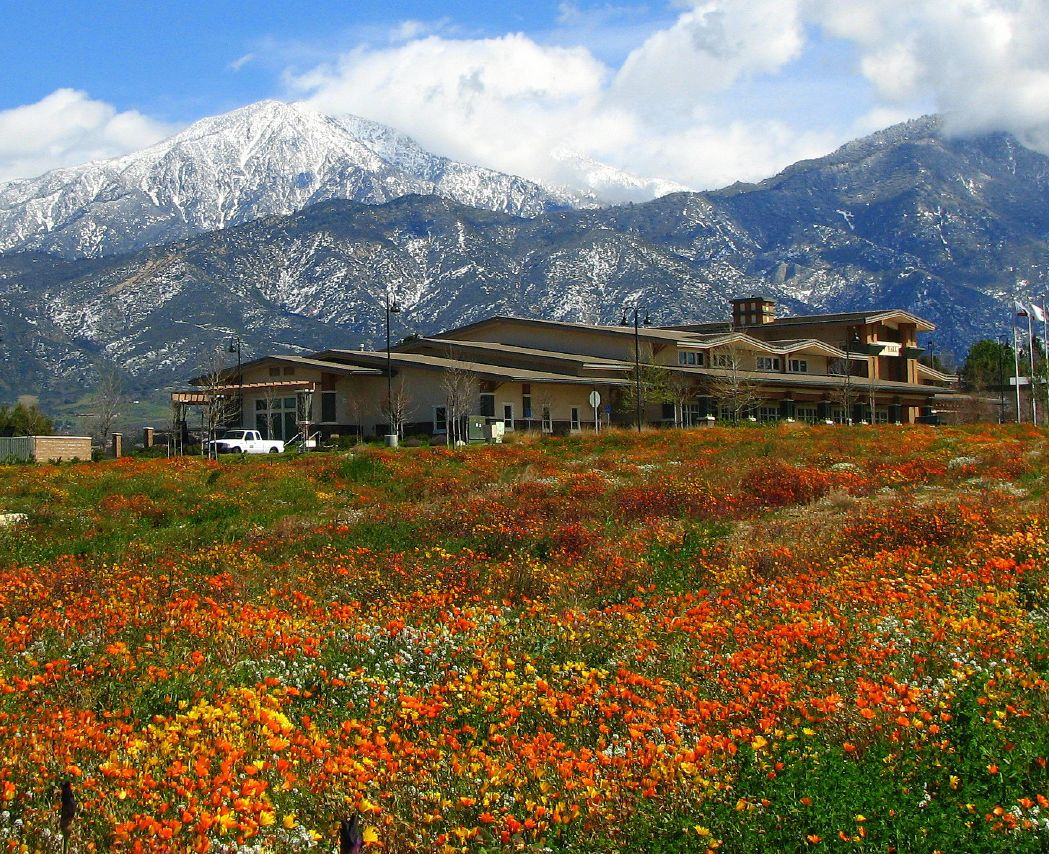
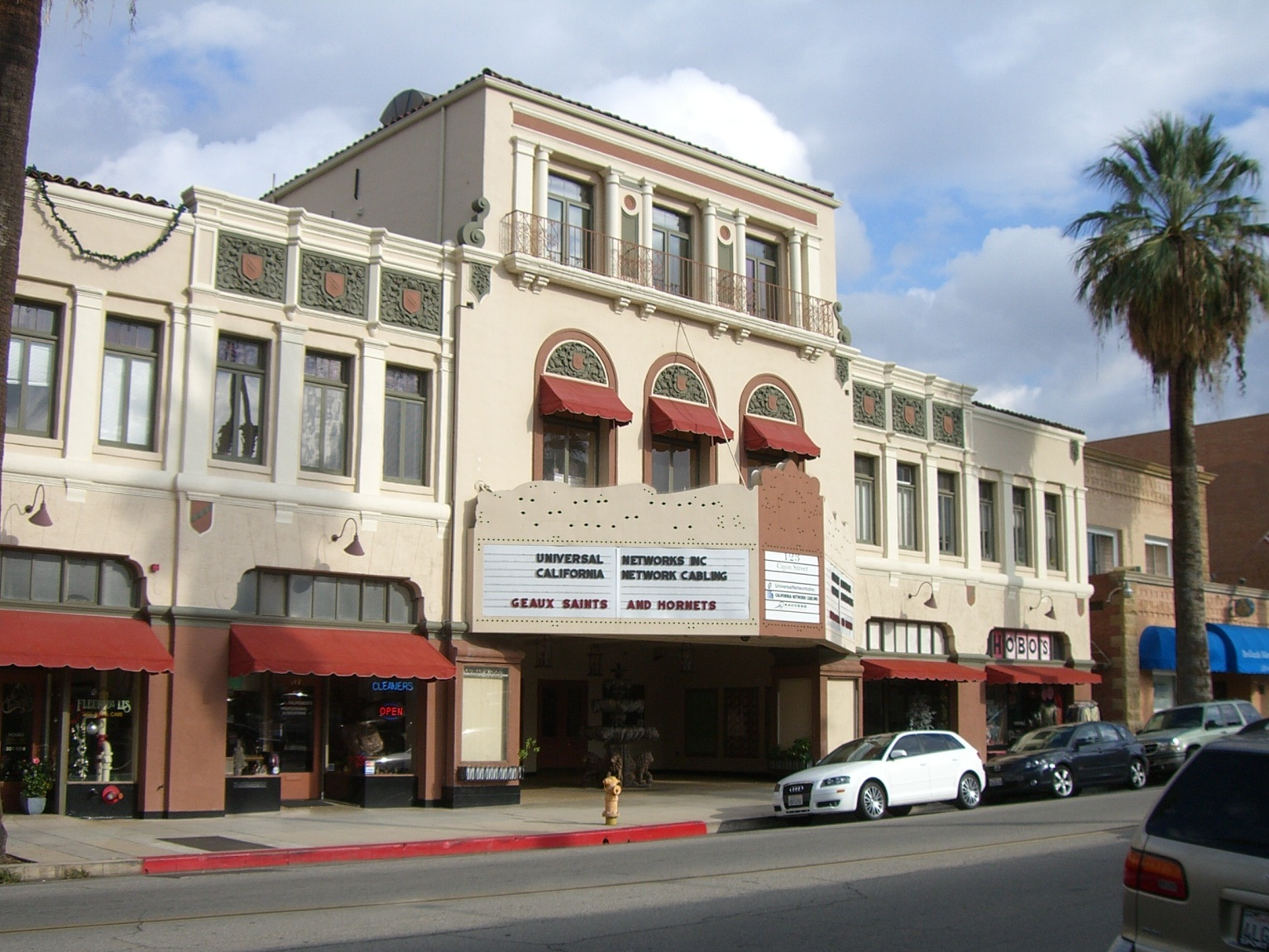
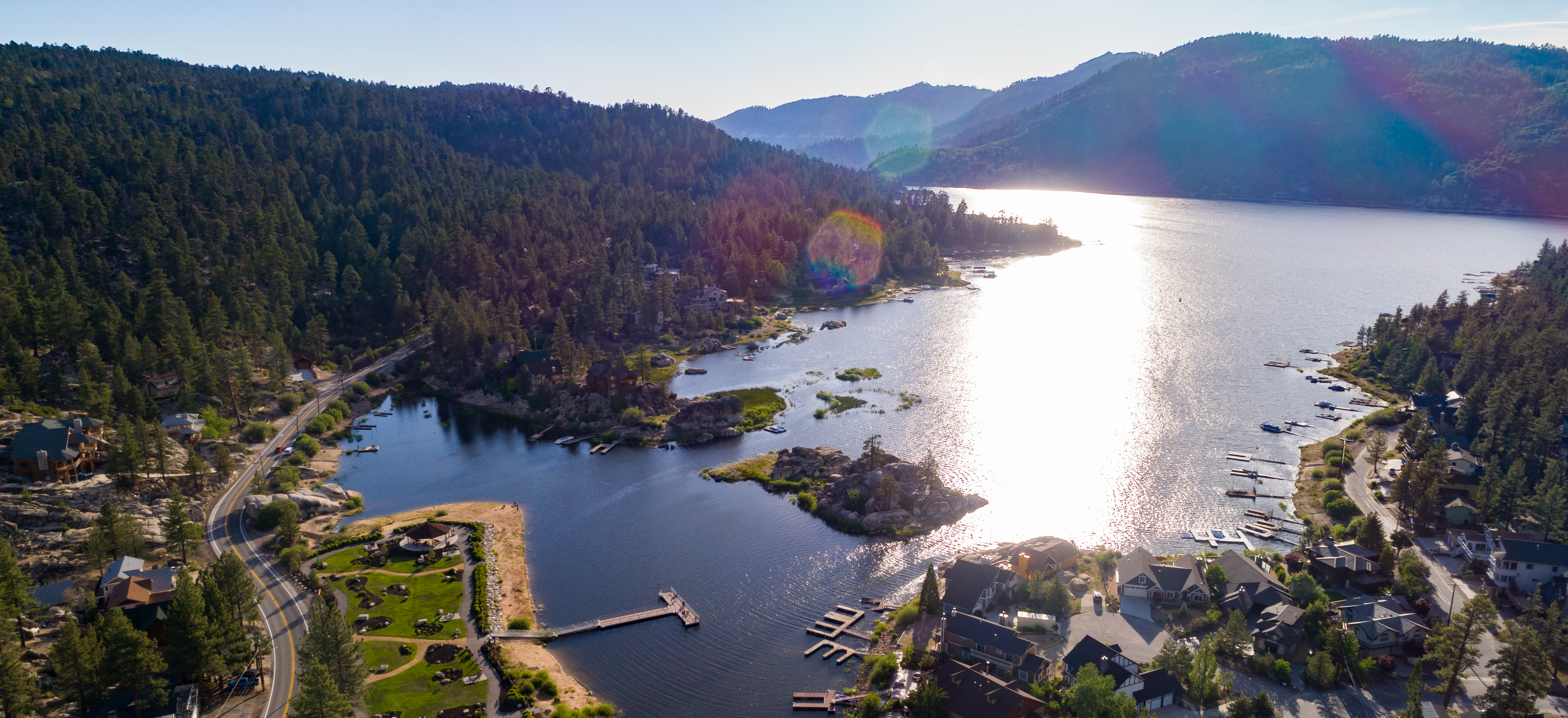
- Rancho Cucamonga and San Gabriel Mountains San Bernardino Trona Pinnacles Yucaipa Redlands Big Bear Lake

- Flag Seal
- Interactive map of San Bernardino County
- Location in California
- Country: United States
- State: California
- Established: April 26, 1853
- Named for: San Bernardino de Sena Estancia, in turn named for Saint Bernardino of Siena
- County seat: San Bernardino
- Largest city (Pop.): San Bernardino
- Largest city (Area): Apple Valley

Government
  - Type: Council–CEO
  - Body: Board of Supervisors
  - Chair: Dawn Rowe
  - Vice Chair: Joe Baca, Jr.
  - Board of Supervisors: Supervisors: Paul Cook; Jesse Armendarez; Dawn Rowe; Curt Hagman; Joe Baca, Jr.
  - Chief executive officer: Luther Snoke

Area
  - Total: 20,160 sq mi (52,200 km^{2})
  - Land: 20,064 sq mi (51,970 km^{2})
  - Water: 96 sq mi (250 km^{2})
- Highest elevation: 11,503 ft (3,506 m)

Population (2020)
  - Total: 2,181,654
  - Estimate (2025): 2,224,091 ▲
  - Rank: 5th in California
  - Density: 108.73/sq mi (41.983/km^{2})

GDP
  - Total: $100.650 billion (2022)
- Time zone: UTC−8 (Pacific Time Zone)
  - Summer (DST): UTC−7 (Pacific Daylight Time)
- Area codes: 442/760, 909, 840, 951
- FIPS code: 06-071
- Congressional districts: 23rd, 25th, 28th, 33rd, 35th, 40th
- Website: sbcounty.gov

San Bernardino County (/sæn ˌbɜːrnəˈdiːnoʊ/ SAN BUR-nə-DEE-noh), officially the County of San Bernardino, is located in the southern portion of the U.S. state of California, and is located within the Inland Empire area. As of the 2020 United States census, the population was 2,181,654, making it the fifth-most populous county in California, and the 14th-most populous in the United States. As part of the Greater Los Angeles area, San Bernardino County is included in the Riverside–San Bernardino–Fontana metropolitan statistical area, and has San Bernardino as its county seat.

With an area of 20,105 square miles (52,070 km^{2}), San Bernardino County is the largest county in the contiguous United States by area. However, some of Alaska's boroughs and census areas are larger. The county is close to the size of West Virginia or the country of Bosnia and Herzegovina, and spans an area from south of the San Bernardino Mountains in San Bernardino Valley, to the Nevada border and the Colorado River.

89% of the population resides in three Census County Divisions (Fontana, San Bernardino, and Victorville-Hesperia), counting 1.93 million people as of the 2020 Census across just 9% of the county area. With a population that is 53.7% Hispanic, it is California's most populous majority-Hispanic county and the second-largest nationwide.

== History ==
=== Indigenous ===
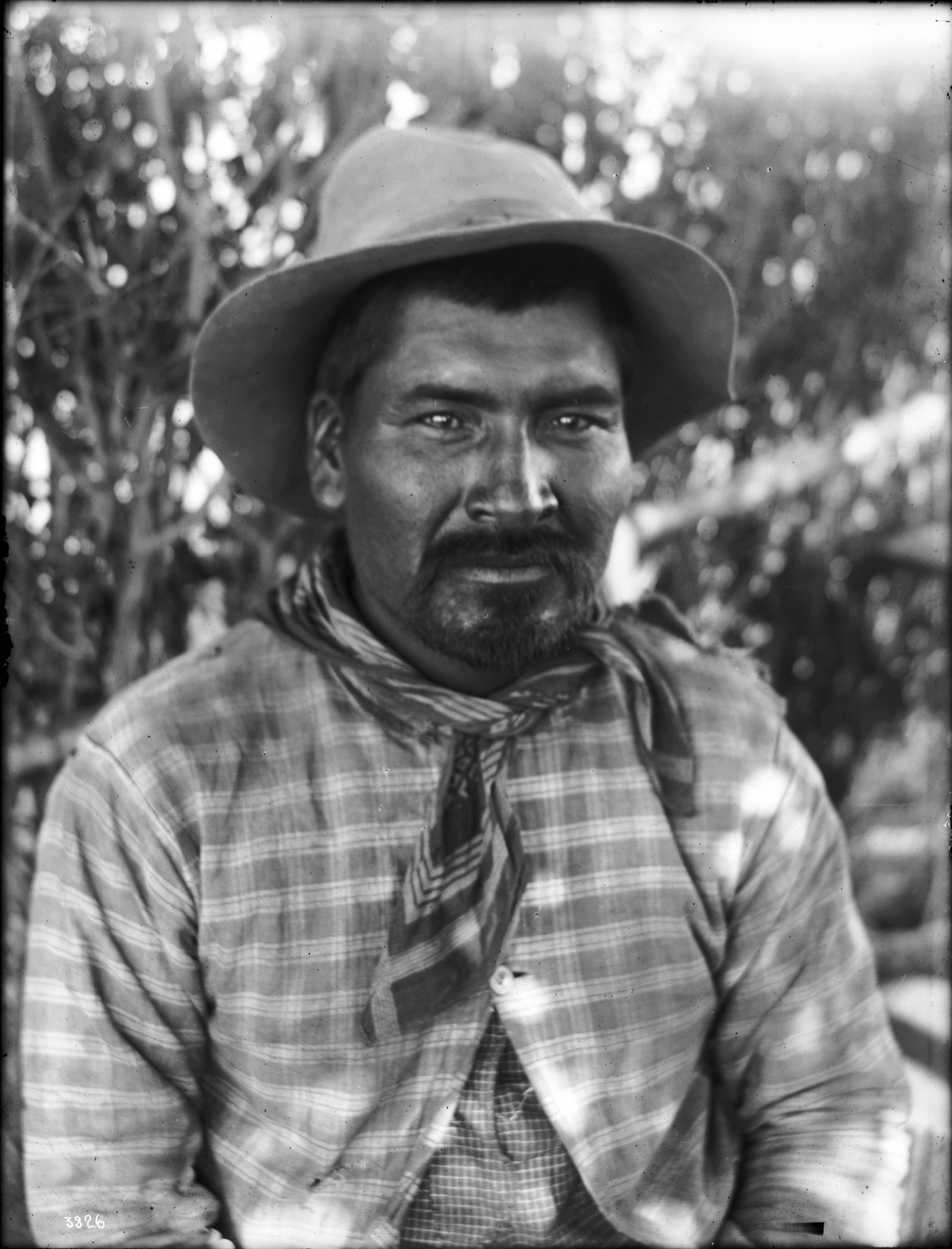
Many different Indigenous groups, including the Cahuilla, long inhabited what became San Bernardino County. Captain of the Agua Caliente Band (1900).

The indigenous peoples that lived in what became San Bernardino County were primarily the Taaqtam (Serrano) and ʔívil̃uqaletem (Cahuilla) peoples who lived in the San Bernardino Valley and the San Bernardino Mountains; the Chemehuevi and the Kawaiisu peoples who lived in the Mojave Desert region; and the 'Aha Makhav (Mohave) and the Piipaash (Maricopa) peoples who lived along the Colorado River. These groups established villages and settlements throughout the region that were interconnected by extensive trails.

Wa'aachnga was a major Tongva village site, also occupied by the Serrano and Cahuilla, located near the area of San Bernardino. The village was part of a trade network along the Mohave Trail that connected villages in San Bernardino County from the Colorado River to the Los Angeles Basin. Wá'peat was a Desert Serrano village located near the area of Hesperia. It was part of a series of villages located along the Mojave River. By the late 1700s, villages in the area were being increasingly encroached by Spanish soldiers and missionaries coming into the region from Mission San Gabriel.

=== Spanish era ===
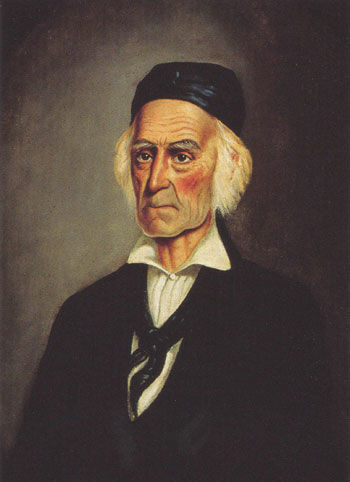
Don Antonio María Lugo was granted the right to settle the San Bernardino Valley in 1839 by Governor Juan Bautista Alvarado.

Spanish Missionaries from Mission San Gabriel Arcángel established a church at the village of Wa'aachnga, which would be renamed Politania in 1810. Father Francisco Dumetz named the church San Bernardino on May 20, 1810, after the feast day of St. Bernardino of Siena. The Franciscans also gave the name San Bernardino to the snowcapped peak in Southern California, in honor of the saint from whom the county derives its name. In 1819, they established the San Bernardino de Sena Estancia, a mission farm in the area of Redlands.

=== Mexican era ===
Following Mexican independence from Spain in 1821, Mexican citizens were granted land grants to establish ranchos in the area of the county. Rancho Jurupa in 1838, Rancho Cucamonga and El Rincon in 1839, Rancho Santa Ana del Chino in 1841, Rancho San Bernardino in 1842 and Rancho Muscupiabe in 1844.

Agua Mansa was the first town in what became San Bernardino County, settled by immigrants from New Mexico on land donated from the Rancho Jurupa in 1841.

=== Establishment ===
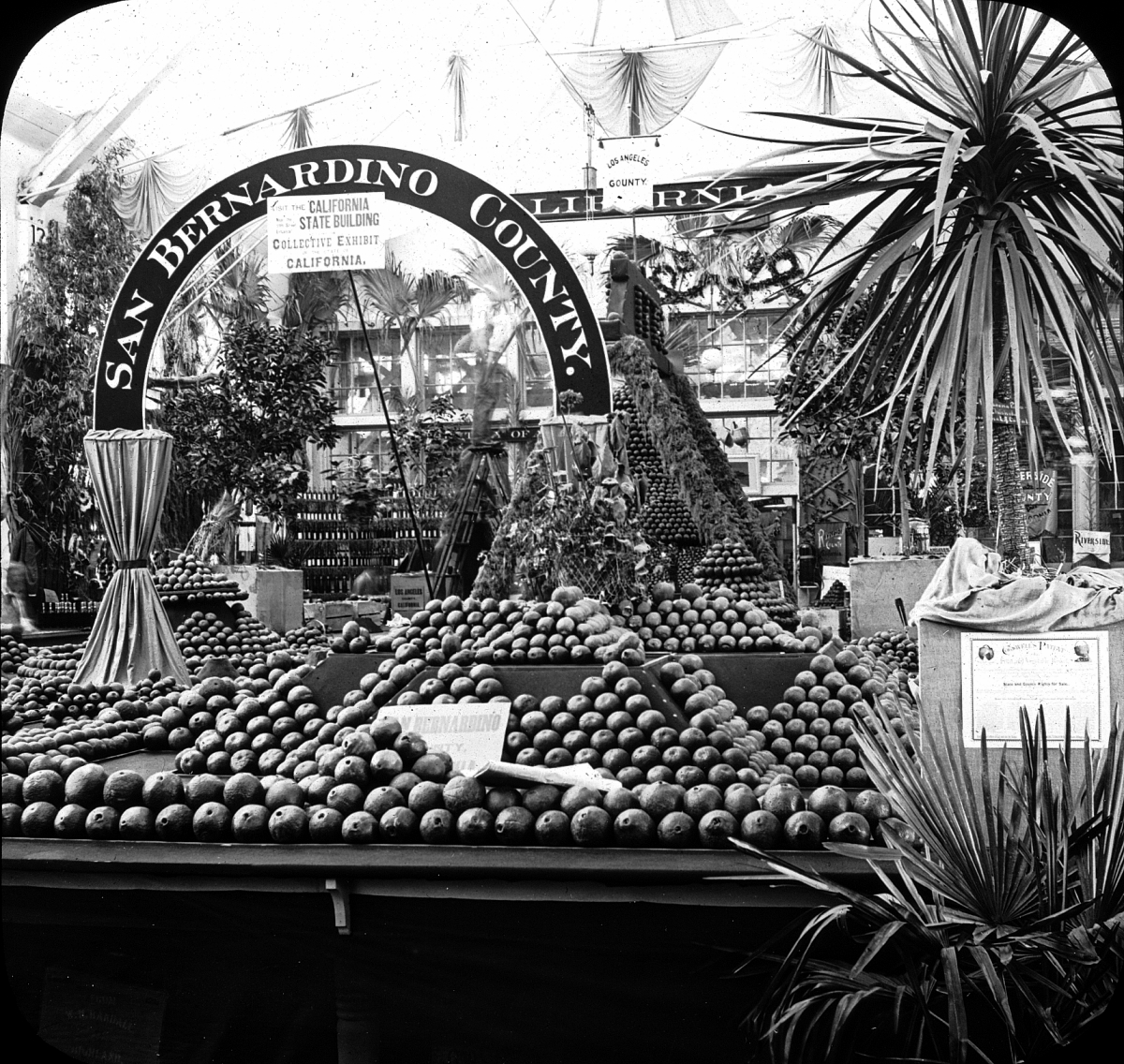
San Bernardino County horticulture exhibit at World Columbian Exposition, Chicago 1893.

Following the purchase of Rancho San Bernardino and the establishment of Fort San Bernardino (later the town of San Bernardino) in 1851 by Mormon colonists, San Bernardino County was formed in 1853 from parts of Los Angeles County by an act of the California State Legislature. Some southern parts of the county territory were moved into Riverside County by an act of the legislature in 1893.

== Geography ==
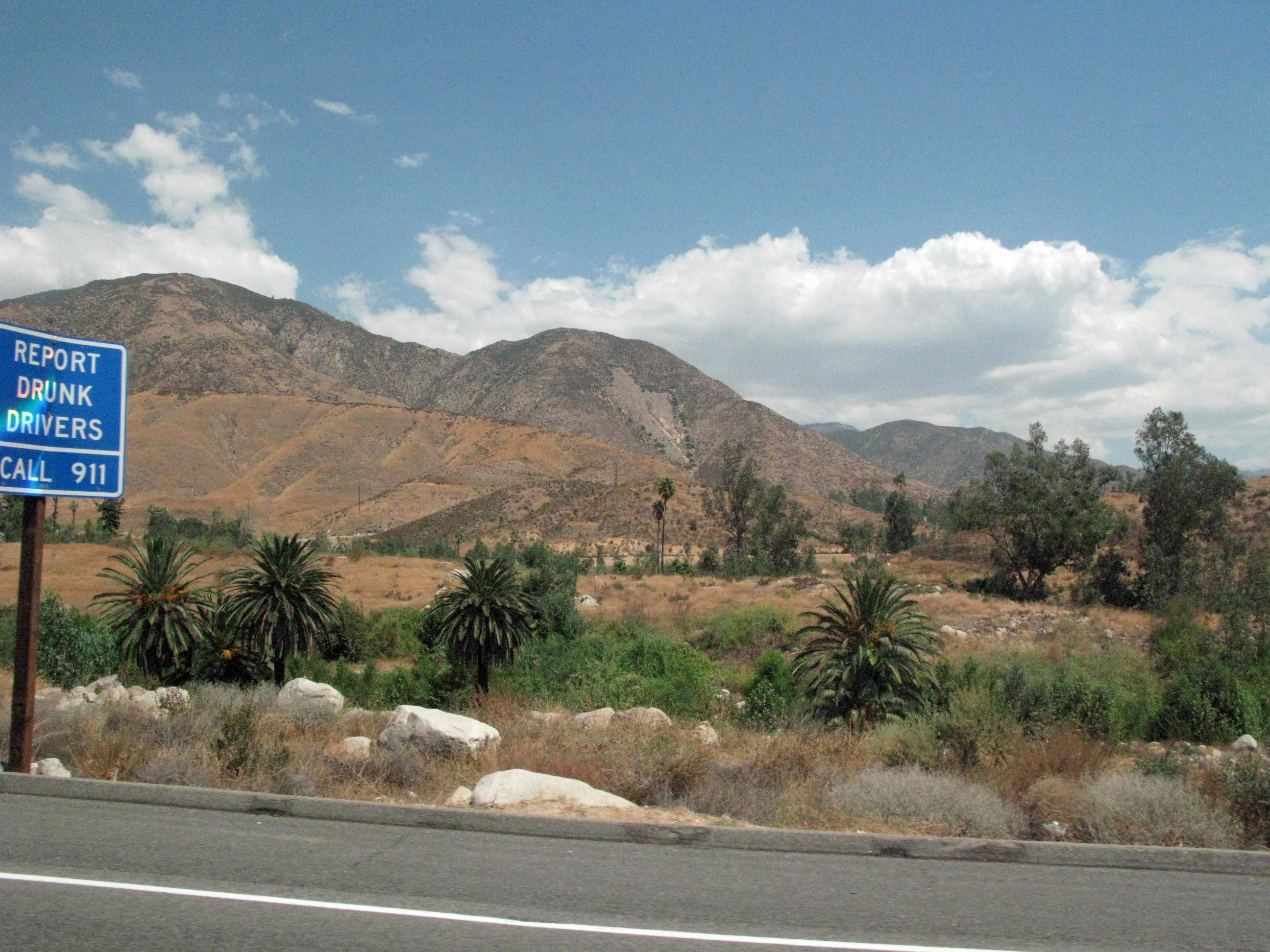
The Arrowhead natural feature is the source of many local names and icons, such as Lake Arrowhead and the county's seal.

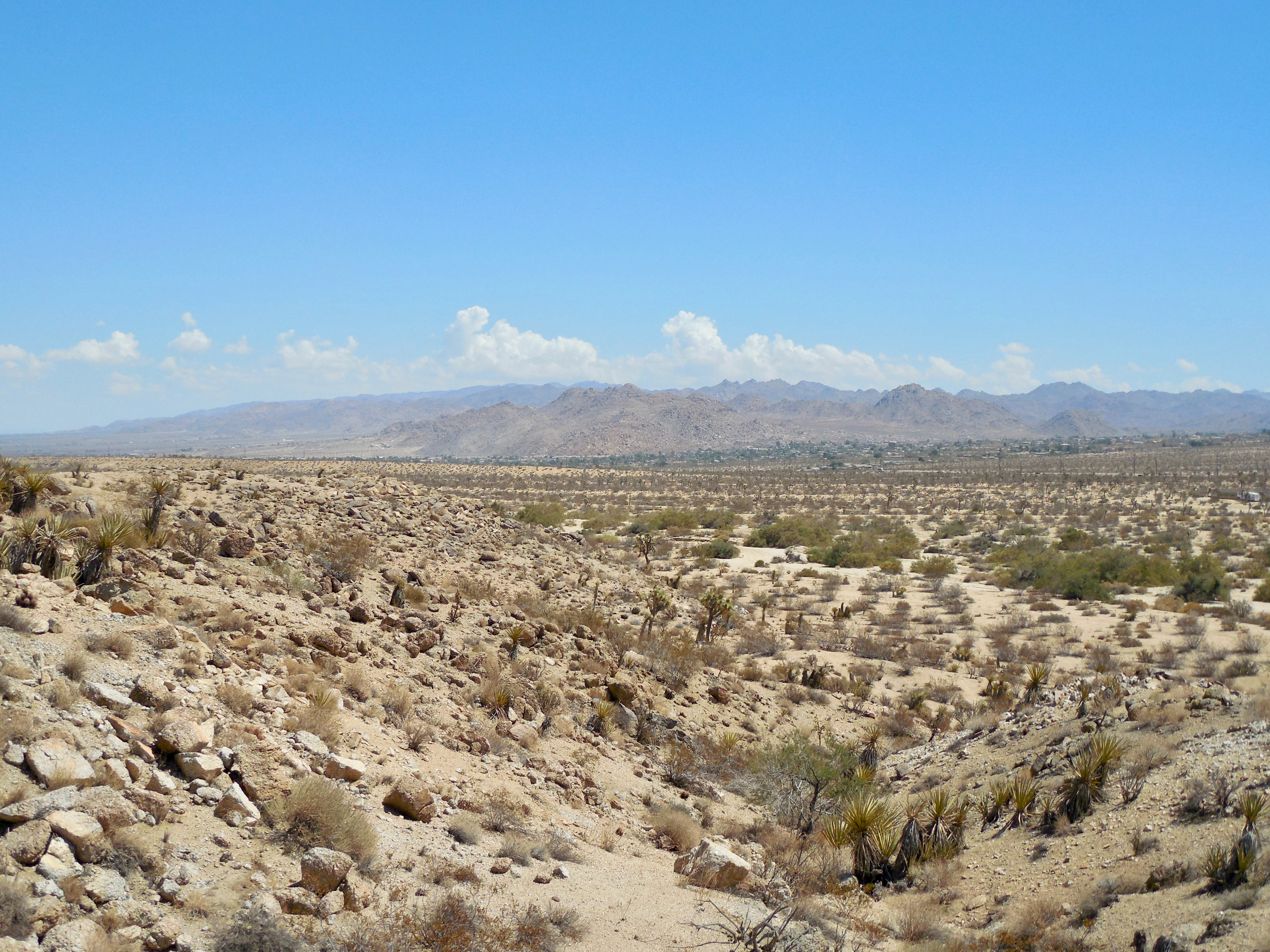
Central Joshua Tree with the mountains of Joshua Tree National Park on the horizon.

According to the U.S. Census Bureau, the county has a total area of 20,105 square miles (52,070 km^{2}), of which 20,057 square miles (51,950 km^{2}) is land and 48 square miles (120 km^{2}) (0.2%) is water. It is the largest county by area in California and the largest in the United States (excluding boroughs in Alaska). It is slightly larger than the states of New Jersey, Connecticut, Delaware and Rhode Island combined, and is also slightly larger than Switzerland. It borders both Nevada and Arizona.

The bulk of the population, nearly two million, live in the roughly 480 square miles south of the San Bernardino Mountains adjacent to Riverside and in the San Bernardino Valley in the southwestern portion of the county. About 390,000 residents live just north of the San Bernardino Mountains, in and around the roughly 280 square-mile area that includes the Victor Valley. Roughly another 100,000 people live scattered across the rest of the sprawling county.

The Mojave National Preserve covers some of the eastern desert, especially between Interstate 15 and Interstate 40. The desert portion also includes the cities of Needles next to the Colorado River and Barstow at the junction of Interstate 15 and Interstate 40. Trona is at the northwestern part of the county, west of Death Valley. This national park, mostly within Inyo County, also has a small portion of land within San Bernardino County. The largest metropolitan area in the Mojave Desert part of the county is the Victor Valley, with the incorporated localities of Adelanto, Apple Valley, Hesperia, and Victorville. Further south, a portion of Joshua Tree National Park overlaps the county near the High Desert area, in the vicinity of Twentynine Palms. The remaining towns make up the remainder of the High Desert: Pioneertown, Yucca Valley, Joshua Tree, Landers, and Morongo Valley.

The mountains are home to the San Bernardino National Forest, and include the communities of Crestline, Lake Arrowhead, Running Springs, Big Bear City, Forest Falls, and Big Bear Lake.

The San Bernardino Valley is at the eastern end of the San Gabriel Valley. The San Bernardino Valley includes the cities of Ontario, Chino, Chino Hills, Upland, Fontana, Rialto, Colton, Grand Terrace, Montclair, Rancho Cucamonga, San Bernardino, Loma Linda, Highland, Redlands, and Yucaipa.

=== Adjacent counties ===
Counties adjacent to San Bernardino County, California	As shown by the map on the left, San Bernardino County is bordered on the north by Inyo County; on the northeast by Clark County, Nevada; on the east by Mohave County, Arizona; on the southeast by La Paz County, Arizona; on the south by Riverside County; on the southwest by Orange County; on the west by Los Angeles County; and on the northwest by Kern County.

=== National protected areas ===
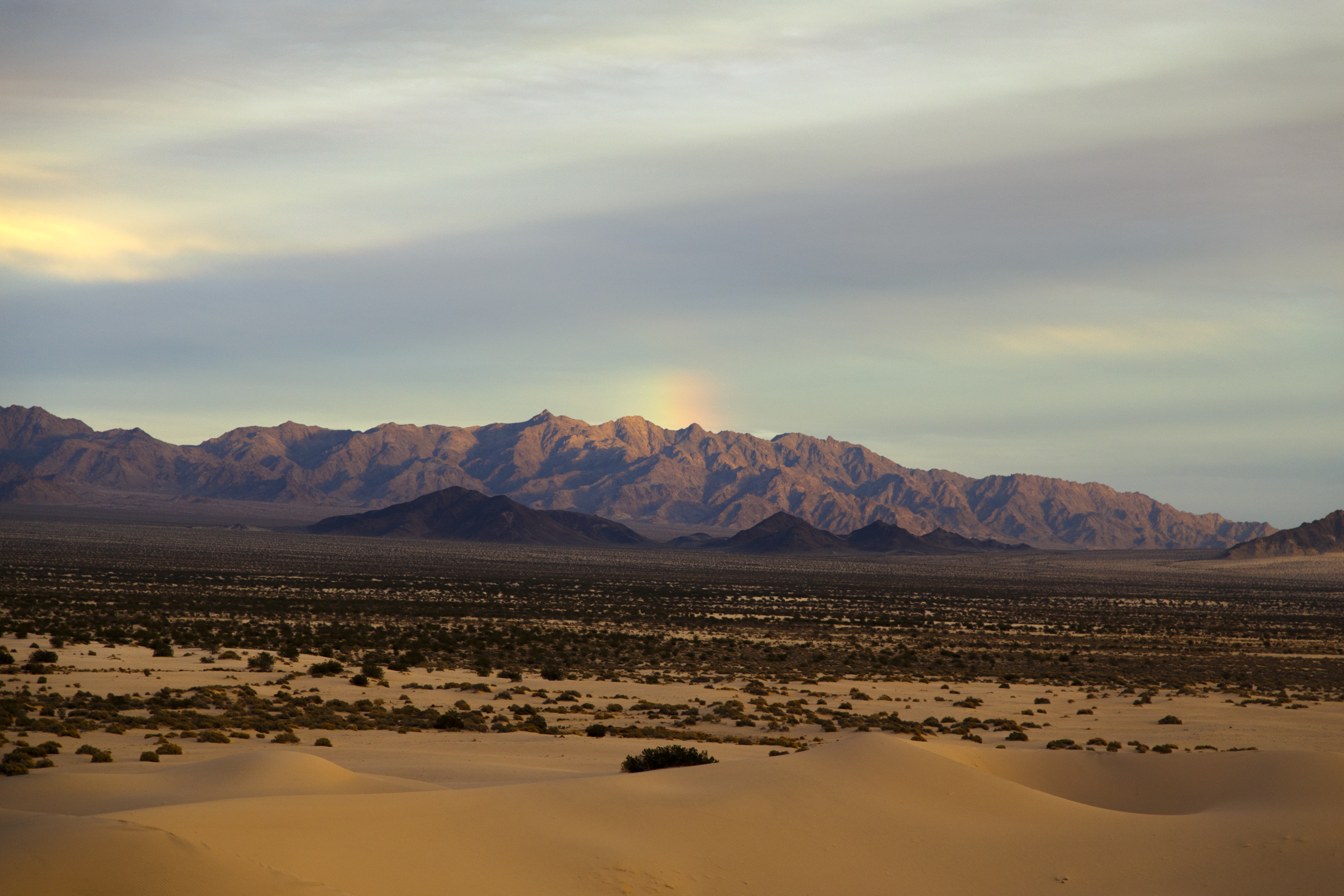
Cadiz Dunes Wilderness

- Angeles National Forest (part)
- Death Valley National Park (part)
- Havasu National Wildlife Refuge (part)
- Joshua Tree National Park (part)
- Mojave National Preserve
- San Bernardino National Forest (part)
- Sand to Snow National Monument (part)

More than 80% of the county's land is owned by the federal government. There are at least 35 official wilderness areas in the county that are part of the National Wilderness Preservation System. This is the largest number of any county in the United States (although not the largest in total area). The majority are managed by the Bureau of Land Management, but some are integral components of the above listed national protected areas. Most of these wilderness areas lie entirely within the county, but a few are shared with neighboring counties (and two of these are shared with the neighboring states of Arizona and Nevada).

Except as noted, these wilderness areas are managed solely by the Bureau of Land Management and lie within San Bernardino County:

- Bigelow Cholla Garden Wilderness
- Bighorn Mountain Wilderness (part)
- Black Mountain Wilderness
- Bristol Mountains Wilderness
- Cadiz Dunes Wilderness
- Chemehuevi Mountains Wilderness
- Cleghorn Lakes Wilderness
- Clipper Mountain Wilderness
- Cucamonga Wilderness
- Dead Mountains Wilderness
- Death Valley Wilderness (part)
- Golden Valley Wilderness
- Grass Valley Wilderness
- Havasu Wilderness (part)
- Hollow Hills Wilderness
- Joshua Tree Wilderness (part)
- Kelso Dunes Wilderness
- Kingston Range Wilderness
- Mesquite Wilderness
- Mojave Wilderness
- Newberry Mountains Wilderness
- North Mesquite Mountains Wilderness
- Old Woman Mountains Wilderness
- Pahrump Valley Wilderness (part)
- Piute Mountains Wilderness
- Rodman Mountains Wilderness
- Saddle Peak Hills Wilderness (part)
- San Gorgonio Wilderness (part)
- Sheep Mountain Wilderness (part)
- Sheephole Valley Wilderness
- Stateline Wilderness
- Stepladder Mountains Wilderness
- Trilobite Wilderness
- Turtle Mountains Wilderness
- Whipple Mountains Wilderness

== Demographics ==
Historical population
Census	Pop.	Note	%±
1860	5,551		—
1870	3,988		−28.2%
1880	7,786		95.2%
1890	25,497		227.5%
1900	27,929		9.5%
1910	56,706		103.0%
1920	73,401		29.4%
1930	133,900		82.4%
1940	161,108		20.3%
1950	281,642		74.8%
1960	503,591		78.8%
1970	684,072		35.8%
1980	895,016		30.8%
1990	1,418,380		58.5%
2000	1,709,434		20.5%
2010	2,035,210		19.1%
2020	2,181,654		7.2%
2025 (est.)	2,224,091	▲	1.9%
U.S. Decennial Census; 1790–1960 1900–1990; 1990–2000 2010 2020

=== 2020 census ===
As of the 2020 census, the county had a population of 2,181,654 and a median age of 34.9 years; 25.3% of residents were under the age of 18 and 12.7% were 65 years of age or older. For every 100 females there were 97.8 males, and for every 100 females age 18 and over there were 95.8 males age 18 and over.

The racial makeup of the county was 35.9% White, 8.5% Black or African American, 1.9% American Indian and Alaska Native, 8.4% Asian, 0.3% Native Hawaiian and Pacific Islander, 28.5% from some other race, and 16.6% from two or more races. Hispanic or Latino residents of any race comprised 53.7% of the population.

94.6% of residents lived in urban areas, while 5.4% lived in rural areas.

There were 667,836 households in the county, of which 40.9% had children under the age of 18 living with them and 25.8% had a female householder with no spouse or partner present. About 18.0% of all households were made up of individuals and 7.6% had someone living alone who was 65 years of age or older.

There were 731,899 housing units, of which 8.8% were vacant. Among occupied housing units, 60.8% were owner-occupied and 39.2% were renter-occupied. The homeowner vacancy rate was 1.3% and the rental vacancy rate was 5.0%.

San Bernardino County, California – Racial and ethnic composition Note: the US Census treats Hispanic/Latino as an ethnic category. This table excludes Latinos from the racial categories and assigns them to a separate category. Hispanics/Latinos may be of any race.
Race / Ethnicity (NH = Non-Hispanic)	Pop 1980	Pop 1990	Pop 2000	Pop 2010	Pop 2020	% 1980	% 1990	% 2000	% 2010	% 2020
White alone (NH)	653,303	862,113	752,222	677,598	566,113	72.99%	60.78%	44.00%	33.29%	25.95%
Black or African American alone (NH)	46,615	109,162	150,201	170,700	173,322	5.21%	7.70%	8.79%	8.39%	7.94%
Native American or Alaska Native alone (NH)	10,084	10,018	9,804	8,523	8,412	1.13%	0.71%	0.57%	0.42%	0.39%
Asian alone (NH)	14,929	55,387	78,154	123,978	176,204	1.67%	3.90%	4.57%	6.09%	8.08%
Native Hawaiian or Pacific Islander alone (NH)	x	x	4,387	5,845	6,173	0.26%	0.29%	0.26%	0.29%	0.28%
Other race alone (NH)	4,222	3,118	3,039	4,055	12,117	0.47%	0.22%	0.18%	0.20%	0.56%
Mixed race or Multiracial (NH)	x	x	42,240	43,366	68,400	x	x	2.47%	2.13%	3.14%
Hispanic or Latino (any race)	165,863	378,582	669,387	1,001,145	1,170,913	18.53%	26.69%	39.16%	49.19%	53.67%
Total	895,016	1,418,380	1,709,434	2,035,210	2,181,654	100.00%	100.00%	100.00%	100.00%	100.00%

=== American Community Survey 2025 data ===
The United States Census Bureau estimated that in 2025, San Bernardino County’s population was 2.224.091. It was also estimated that the county's population was 22,62% Non-Hispanic White, 56,87% Hispanic or Latino, 7,69% Non-Hispanic Black, 9,40% Asian, 0,38% Native American, 0,29% Pacific Islander, and 2,76% Multiracial.

Total	Population	Percentage
Non-Hispanic White	503.062	22,62%
Hispanic or Latino	1.264.821	56,87%
Non-Hispanic Black	171.120	7,69%
Asian	209.021	9,40%
Native American	8.341	0,38%
Pacific Islander	6.436	0,29%
Non-Hispanic Multiracial	61.290	2,76%

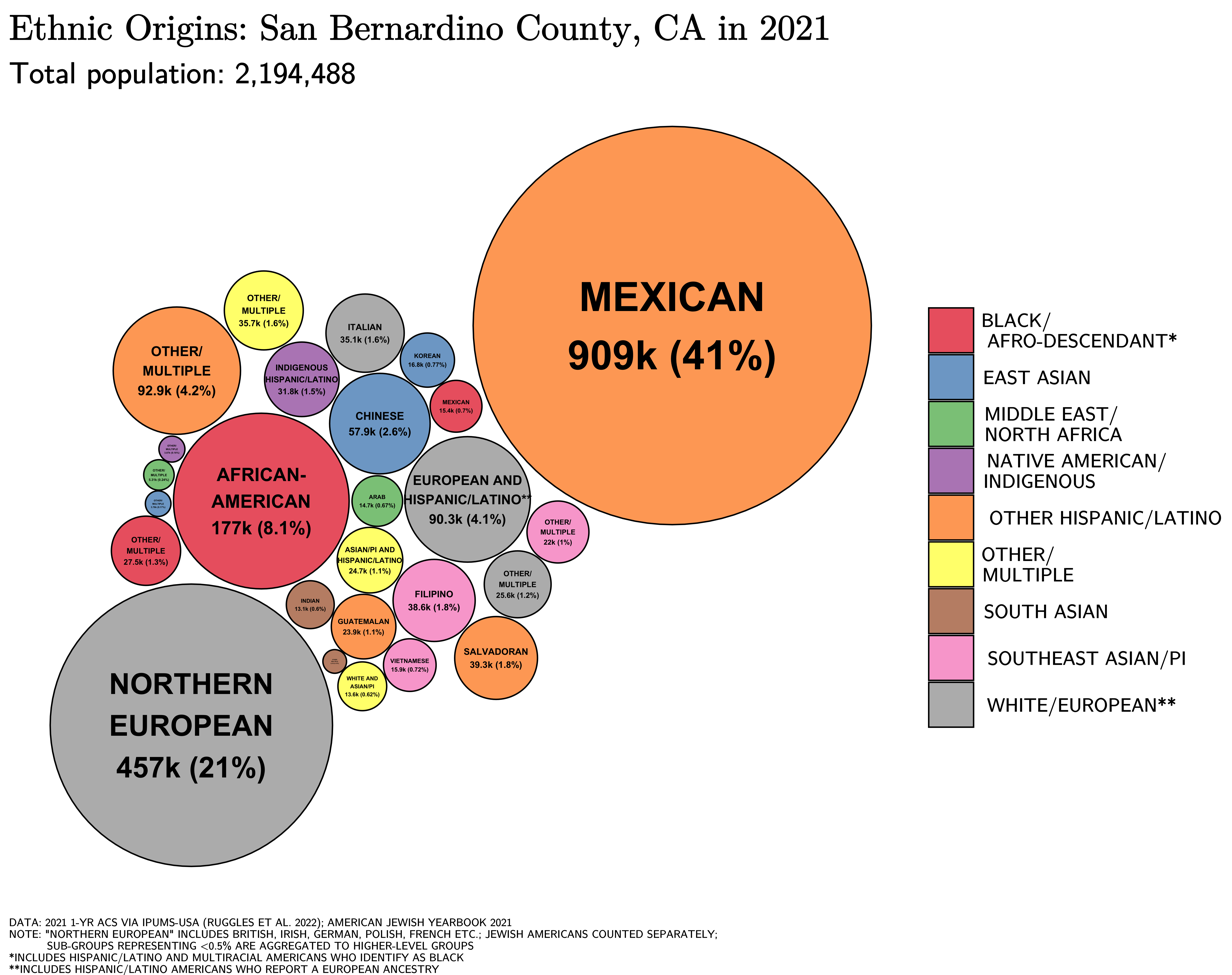
Ethnic origins in San Bernardino County

=== 2010 census ===
The 2010 United States census reported that San Bernardino County had a population of 2,035,210. The racial makeup of San Bernardino County was 1,153,161 (56.7%) White, 181,862 (8.9%) African American, 22,689 (1.1%) Native American, 128,603 (6.3%) Asian, 6,870 (0.3%) Pacific Islander, 439,661 (21.6%) from other races, and 102,364 (5.0%) from two or more races. There were 1,001,145 people of Hispanic or Latino origin, of any race (49.2%).

Population reported at 2010 United States census
The county	Total Population	White	African American	Native American	Asian	Pacific Islander	other races	two or more races	Hispanic or Latino (of any race)
San Bernardino County	2,035,210	1,153,161	181,862	22,689	128,603	6,870	439,661	102,364	1,001,145
Incorporated cities and towns	Total Population	White	African American	Native American	Asian	Pacific Islander	other races	two or more races	Hispanic or Latino (of any race)
Adelanto	31,765	13,909	6,511	411	617	194	8,337	1,786	18,513
Apple Valley	69,135	47,762	6,321	779	2,020	294	8,345	3,614	20,156
Barstow	22,639	11,840	3,313	477	723	278	4,242	1,766	9,700
Big Bear Lake	5,019	4,204	22	48	78	10	491	166	1,076
Chino	77,983	43,981	4,829	786	8,159	168	16,503	3,557	41,993
Chino Hills	74,799	38,035	3,415	379	22,676	115	6,520	3,659	21,802
Colton	52,154	22,613	5,055	661	2,590	176	18,413	2,646	37,039
Fontana	196,069	92,978	19,574	1,957	12,948	547	58,449	9,616	130,957
Grand Terrace	12,040	7,912	673	120	778	32	1,898	627	4,708
Hesperia	90,173	55,129	5,226	1,118	1,884	270	22,115	4,431	44,091
Highland	53,104	27,836	5,887	542	3,954	168	11,826	2,891	25,556
Loma Linda	23,261	11,122	2,032	97	6,589	154	2,022	1,245	5,171
Montclair	36,664	19,337	1,908	434	3,425	74	9,882	1,604	25,744
Needles	4,844	3,669	95	399	35	9	323	314	1,083
Ontario	163,924	83,683	10,561	1,686	8,453	514	51,373	7,654	113,085
Rancho Cucamonga	165,269	102,401	15,246	1,134	17,208	443	19,878	8,959	57,688
Redlands	68,747	47,452	3,564	625	5,216	235	8,266	3,389	20,810
Rialto	99,171	43,592	16,236	1,062	2,258	361	30,993	4,669	67,038
San Bernardino	209,924	95,734	31,582	2,822	8,454	839	59,827	10,666	125,994
Twentynine Palms	25,048	17,938	2,063	329	979	345	1,678	1,716	5,212
Upland	73,732	48,364	5,400	522	6,217	159	9,509	3,561	28,035
Victorville	115,903	56,258	19,483	1,665	4,641	489	26,036	7,331	55,359
Yucaipa	51,367	40,824	837	485	1,431	74	5,589	2,127	13,943
Yucca Valley	20,700	17,280	666	232	469	44	1,185	824	3,679
Census-designated places	Total Population	White	African American	Native American	Asian	Pacific Islander	other races	two or more races	Hispanic or Latino (of any race)
Baker	735	302	1	5	10	14	380	23	502
Big Bear City	12,304	10,252	83	202	103	31	1,089	544	2,323
Big River	1,327	1,137	14	50	2	0	54	70	160
Bloomington	23,851	12,988	649	309	330	47	8,600	928	19,326
Bluewater	172	156	2	1	0	1	9	3	11
Crestline	10,770	9,289	107	135	96	20	526	597	1,775
Fort Irwin	8,845	5,481	1,086	103	402	120	916	737	2,261
Homestead Valley	3,032	2,594	34	58	30	9	196	111	517
Joshua Tree	7,414	6,176	234	84	104	18	368	430	1,308
Lake Arrowhead	12,424	10,729	95	93	152	33	847	475	2,709
Lenwood	3,543	2,133	219	94	37	25	813	222	1,675
Lucerne Valley	5,811	4,507	170	106	90	0	676	262	1,447
Lytle Creek	701	606	6	7	23	0	25	34	98
Mentone	8,720	6,114	438	122	352	32	1,234	428	3,085
Morongo Valley	3,552	3,076	40	73	31	4	187	141	531
Mountain View Acres	3,130	1,748	215	48	98	17	861	143	1,647
Muscoy	10,644	4,459	454	125	101	16	4,992	497	8,824
Oak Glen	638	545	50	13	2	1	14	13	123
Oak Hills	8,879	6,796	266	100	226	28	1,166	297	2,719
Phelan	14,304	10,807	276	139	446	20	1,993	623	4,128
Piñon Hills	7,272	5,966	58	65	189	4	659	331	1,738
Running Springs	4,862	4,325	23	47	50	6	146	265	695
San Antonio Heights	3,371	2,765	67	24	284	15	115	101	612
Searles Valley	1,739	1,405	69	56	16	6	83	104	293
Silver Lakes	5,623	4,566	315	39	198	15	270	220	907
Spring Valley Lake	8,220	6,450	403	55	381	23	481	427	1,528
Wrightwood	4,525	4,126	38	28	51	7	112	163	538
Other unincorporated areas	Total Population	White	African American	Native American	Asian	Pacific Islander	other races	two or more races	Hispanic or Latino (of any race)
All others not CDPs (combined)	115,368	69,810	5,951	1,738	2,997	366	29,149	5,357	61,233

=== 2000 census ===
As of the census of 2000, there were 1,709,434 people, 528,594 households, and 404,374 families residing in the county. The population density was 85 inhabitants per square mile (33/km^{2}). There were 601,369 housing units at an average density of 30 per square mile (12/km^{2}). The racial makeup of the county was 58.9% White, 9.1% African American, 1.2% Native American, 4.7% Asian, 0.3% Pacific Islander, 20.8% from other races, and 5.0% from two or more races. 39.2% of the population were Hispanic or Latino of any race. 8.3% were of German, 5.5% English and 5.1% Irish ancestry. 66.1% spoke English, 27.7% Spanish and 1.1% Tagalog as their first language.

There were 528,594 households, out of which 43.7% had children under the age of 18 living with them, 55.8% were married couples living together, 14.8% had a female householder with no husband present, and 23.5% were non-families. 18.4% of all households were made up of individuals, and 6.6% had someone 65 years of age or older living alone. The average household size was 3.2 people, and the average family size was 3.6 people.

The number of homeless in San Bernardino County grew from 5,270 in 2002 to 7,331 in 2007, a 39% increase.

In the county, 32.3% of the population was under the age of 18, 10.3% was from 18 to 24, 30.2% from 25 to 44, 18.7% from 45 to 64, and 8.6% was 65 years of age or older. The median age was 30 years. For every 100 females, there were 99.6 males. For every 100 females age 18 and over, there were 97.2 males.

The median income for a household in the county was $42,066, and the median income for a family was $46,574. Males had a median income of $37,025 versus $27,993 for females. The per capita income for the county was $16,856. About 12.6% of families and 15.80% of the population were below the poverty line, including 20.6% of those under age 18 and 8.4% of those age 65 or over.

== Government ==
=== County government ===
As of 2021, the Board of Supervisors oversees a $7.9 billion annual budget and 25,430 employees.

The San Bernardino County Board of Supervisors has five members elected from their districts:

District	Supervisor	Party (officially nonpartisan)
1	Paul Cook	Republican
2	Jesse Armendarez	Republican
3	Dawn Rowe	Republican
4	Curt Hagman	Republican
5	Joe Baca Jr.	Democratic

Other County of San Bernardino Elected Officials

- Ensen Mason (Auditor-Controller/Treasurer/Tax Collector)
- Josie Gonzales (Assessor/Recorder)
- Theodore Alejandre (County Superintendent of Schools)
- Jason Anderson (District Attorney)
- Shannon Dicus (Sheriff/Coroner/Public Administrator)

=== State and federal representation ===
In the United States House of Representatives, San Bernardino County is split among 6 congressional districts:

- California's 23rd congressional district, represented by Republican Jay Obernolte,
- California's 25th congressional district, represented by Democrat Raul Ruiz,
- California's 28th congressional district, represented by Democrat Judy Chu,
- California's 33rd congressional district, represented by Democrat Pete Aguilar,
- California's 35th congressional district, represented by Democrat Norma Torres, and
- California's 40th congressional district, represented by Republican Young Kim.

In the California State Assembly, San Bernardino County is split among 10 assembly districts:

- the 34th Assembly district, represented by Republican Tom Lackey,
- the 36th Assembly district, represented by Republican Jeff Gonzalez,
- the 39th Assembly district, represented by Democrat Juan Carrillo,
- the 41st Assembly district, represented by Democrat John Harabedian,
- the 45th Assembly district, represented by Democrat James Ramos,
- the 47th Assembly district, represented by Republican Greg Wallis,
- the 50th Assembly district, represented by Democrat Robert Garcia,
- the 53rd Assembly district, represented by Democrat Michelle Rodriguez,
- the 58th Assembly district, represented by Republican Leticia Castillo, and
- the 59th Assembly district, represented by Republican Phillip Chen.

In the California State Senate, San Bernardino County is split among 7 districts:

- the 18th senatorial district, represented by Democrat Steve Padilla,
- the 19th senatorial district, represented by Republican Rosilicie Ochoa Bogh,
- the 22nd senatorial district, represented by Democrat Susan Rubio,
- the 23rd senatorial district, represented by Republican Suzette Martinez Valladares,
- the 25th senatorial district, represented by Democrat Sasha Renée Pérez,
- the 29th senatorial district, represented by Democrat Eloise Reyes,
- the 31st senatorial district, represented by Democrat Sabrina Cervantes, and
- the 32nd senatorial district, represented by Republican Kelly Seyarto.

== Politics ==
San Bernardino County is a county in which candidates from both major political parties have won in recent elections. Republican Donald Trump carried the county in 2024, flipping it for the first time in a presidential race since 2004.

In past presidential elections, Democrat Joe Biden carried the county by a majority and by double digits as well as Hillary Clinton in 2016. The Democratic Party also carried the county in 2008 and 2012, when Barack Obama won majorities of the county's votes, and in 1992 and 1996, when Bill Clinton won pluralities. Republican George W. Bush took the county in 2000 by a plurality and in 2004 by a majority. The county is split between heavily Latino, middle-class, and Democratic areas and wealthier conservative areas. The heavily Latino cities of Ontario and San Bernardino went for John Kerry in 2004, but with a relatively low voter turnout. In 2006, San Bernardino's population exceeded 201,000, and in 2004, only 42,520 votes were cast in the city; that same year, strongly Republican Rancho Cucamonga had over 145,000 residents, of whom 53,054 voted.

In the 1980s, Northern San Bernardino County proposed to create Mojave County due to the abysmal service levels the county provided. Ultimately, the vote for county secession failed. The proposed county was from the Cajon Pass to the city of Needles.

In 1998, County administrator James Hlawek resigned after being subject to an FBI investigation for bribery, but only after Harry Mays, county Treasurer-Tax Collector Thomas O'Donnell, County Investment Officer Sol Levin and three businessmen had agreed to plead guilty to federal bribery charges.

In 2004, County Supervisor Gerald Eaves pleaded guilty to bribery for accepting gifts from businesses for allowing billboards on county land.

On November 4, 2008, San Bernardino County voted 67% for Proposition 8, which amended the California Constitution to ban same-sex marriages.

From 2004 to 2016, the county was embroiled in a corruption scandal over the Colonies housing development in Upland with real estate developer Jeff Burum. The scandal resulted in $102 million being paid to Burum's real estate company. Supervisor Bill Postmus pleaded guilty to 10 felonies in regard to his previous post as county assessor. In 2020, Burum sued the county again and the county reached a $69 million settlement. In 2022, the county's insurance company, Ironside, balked at paying the settlement, claiming that the county willfully "retaliate[d] against the Colonies II Plaintiffs as part of a decades-long dispute over land and water rights in Upland, California, culminating in a malicious prosecution of Burum."

In 2020, voters approved Measure K, which limited county supervisors to one term instead of three, while reducing pay from 250 thousand dollars to 60 thousand dollars. County Supervisors appealed the decision, only to lose in the state's appeals court. By 2022, term limits were restored and pay was restored to 80% of the annual base compensation for San Bernardino Superior Court judges under a supervisor-led ballot measure.

In 2022, The Board of supervisors were pushed by a major supervisor campaign contributor Jeff Burum to vote for secession from the State of California to form the state of Empire. A referendum in 2022 requesting the county board seek a "fair share" of government funding, by means including secession, narrowly passed.

In 2023, San Bernardino County Chief Executive Officer Leonard X. Hernandez resigned, claiming urgent family health issues, after being accused of having an affair with a county employee. After the accustation came out, the county placed Hernandez on Leave. After Hernandez resigned, Hernandez still got paid for one year after his departure.

=== Presidential election results and voter registration ===
According to the California Secretary of State, as of February 2020, there were 1,016,190 registered voters in San Bernardino County. Of those, 410,197 (40.37%) were registered Democrats, 298,234 (29.35%) were registered Republicans, with the remainder belonging to minor political parties or declining to state.

United States presidential election results for San Bernardino County, California
Year	Republican		Democratic		Third party(ies)	
Year	No.	%	No.	%	No.	%
1880	730	49.09%	711	47.81%	46	3.09%
1884	1,617	54.37%	1,288	43.31%	69	2.32%
1888	3,059	53.50%	2,388	41.76%	271	4.74%
1892	3,686	48.71%	2,546	33.65%	1,335	17.64%
1896	2,818	48.54%	2,740	47.20%	247	4.25%
1900	3,135	52.15%	2,347	39.05%	529	8.80%
1904	3,884	58.23%	1,573	23.58%	1,213	18.19%
1908	4,729	52.90%	2,685	30.03%	1,526	17.07%
1912	172	1.12%	5,835	38.03%	9,336	60.85%
1916	11,932	50.68%	9,398	39.92%	2,215	9.41%
1920	12,518	62.84%	5,620	28.21%	1,783	8.95%
1924	15,974	56.93%	2,634	9.39%	9,453	33.69%
1928	29,229	74.73%	9,436	24.13%	447	1.14%
1932	22,094	44.59%	24,889	50.23%	2,565	5.18%
1936	22,219	38.97%	33,955	59.55%	842	1.48%
1940	30,511	44.30%	37,520	54.47%	847	1.23%
1944	34,084	46.52%	38,530	52.59%	646	0.88%
1948	46,570	48.59%	45,691	47.68%	3,577	3.73%
1952	77,718	57.34%	56,663	41.81%	1,153	0.85%
1956	86,263	56.88%	64,946	42.83%	443	0.29%
1960	99,481	52.00%	90,888	47.51%	944	0.49%
1964	92,145	42.78%	123,012	57.11%	243	0.11%
1968	111,974	50.07%	89,418	39.99%	22,224	9.94%
1972	144,689	59.73%	85,986	35.49%	11,581	4.78%
1976	113,265	49.49%	109,636	47.90%	5,984	2.61%
1980	172,957	59.68%	91,790	31.67%	25,065	8.65%
1984	222,071	64.80%	116,454	33.98%	4,180	1.22%
1988	235,167	59.99%	151,118	38.55%	5,723	1.46%
1992	176,563	37.24%	183,634	38.74%	113,873	24.02%
1996	180,135	43.58%	183,372	44.36%	49,848	12.06%
2000	221,757	48.75%	214,749	47.21%	18,387	4.04%
2004	289,306	55.34%	227,789	43.57%	5,682	1.09%
2008	277,408	45.75%	315,720	52.07%	13,206	2.18%
2012	262,358	45.12%	305,109	52.47%	14,050	2.42%
2016	271,240	41.48%	340,833	52.12%	41,910	6.41%
2020	366,257	43.54%	455,859	54.20%	19,014	2.26%
2024	378,416	49.67%	362,114	47.53%	21,316	2.80%

Population and registered voters
Total population	2,023,452	
Registered voters (Note: Percentage of registered voters with respect to total population. Percentages of party members with respect to registered voters follow.)	869,637	43.0%
Democratic	339,603	39.1%
Republican	307,945	35.4%
Democratic–Republican spread	+31,658	+3.7%
American Independent	31,121	3.6%
Green	3,174	0.4%
Libertarian	5,121	0.6%
Peace and Freedom	3,204	0.4%
Americans Elect	68	0.0%
Other	1,941	0.2%
No party preference	177,460	20.4%

==== Cities by population and voter registration ====
City	Population	Registered voters	Democratic	Republican	D–R spread	Other	No party preference
Adelanto	30,670	29.8%	48.8%	21.7%	+27.1%	11.1%	23.2%
Apple Valley	68,316	52.3%	29.1%	46.1%	-17.0%	11.5%	18.4%
Barstow	22,913	37.2%	41.5%	29.0%	+12.5%	11.0%	23.3%
Big Bear Lake	5,109	56.7%	23.9%	51.6%	-27.7%	10.8%	17.9%
Chino	78,050	42.0%	39.2%	36.9%	+2.3%	7.1%	19.8%
Chino Hills	74,765	52.6%	31.8%	40.6%	-8.8%	6.9%	23.4%
Colton	52,283	38.9%	49.9%	25.4%	+24.5%	7.5%	20.2%
Fontana	192,779	38.2%	48.6%	24.7%	+23.9%	7.0%	22.5%
Grand Terrace	12,132	54.9%	37.0%	39.3%	-2.3%	8.1%	18.9%
Hesperia	88,247	41.7%	34.3%	38.2%	-3.9%	10.9%	21.2%
Highland	52,777	45.5%	38.4%	37.4%	+1.0%	8.0%	19.5%
Loma Linda	23,081	46.2%	32.9%	36.3%	-3.4%	8.5%	25.8%
Montclair	36,802	35.8%	50.2%	23.5%	+26.7%	7.1%	21.8%
Needles	4,910	39.1%	40.8%	28.7%	+12.1%	13.8%	22.8%
Ontario	165,120	36.7%	46.9%	28.5%	+18.4%	7.1%	20.3%
Rancho Cucamonga	163,151	53.8%	35.6%	39.5%	-3.9%	8.0%	20.3%
Redlands	68,995	56.1%	33.9%	42.4%	-8.5%	8.9%	18.4%
Rialto	99,501	39.6%	52.0%	23.7%	+28.3%	6.9%	20.1%
San Bernardino	210,100	36.8%	46.5%	29.5%	+17.0%	7.7%	19.4%
Twentynine Palms	25,786	22.1%	27.5%	41.1%	-13.6%	11.1%	24.9%
Upland	74,021	52.0%	35.4%	40.7%	-5.3%	7.6%	19.3%
Victorville	111,704	38.4%	43.5%	29.6%	+13.9%	10.0%	21.1%
Yucaipa	50,862	54.1%	27.5%	48.9%	-21.4%	10.4%	17.5%
Yucca Valley	20,508	48.0%	28.1%	45.3%	-17.2%	11.4%	20.1%

== Public safety ==
=== Law enforcement ===
==== Sheriff ====
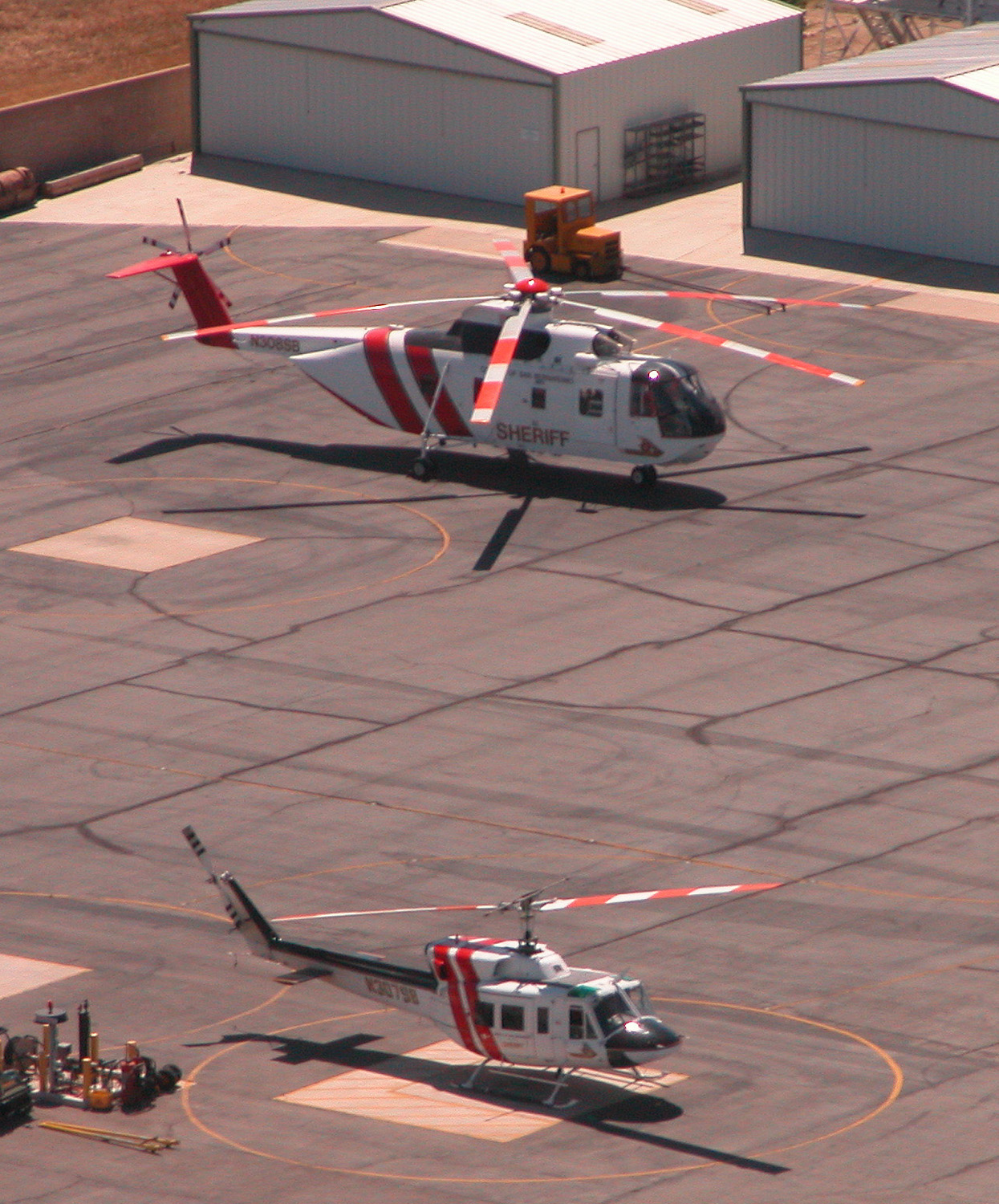
SBC Sheriff's department operates a sizable fleet of helicopters. Shown here are a Bell 212 (foreground) and a Sikorsky S-61 at the air unit's Rialto Airport headquarters.

The county's primary law enforcement agency is the San Bernardino County Sheriff's Department. The department provides law enforcement services in the unincorporated areas of the county and in 14 contract cities, operates the county jail system, provides marshal services in the county superior courts, and has numerous other divisions to serve the residents of the county.

==== Fire ====
The county operates the San Bernardino County Consolidated Fire District (commonly known as the San Bernardino County Fire Department). The department provides "all-risk" fire, rescue, and emergency medical services to all unincorporated areas in the county except for several areas served by independent fire protection districts, and several cities that chose to contract with the department.

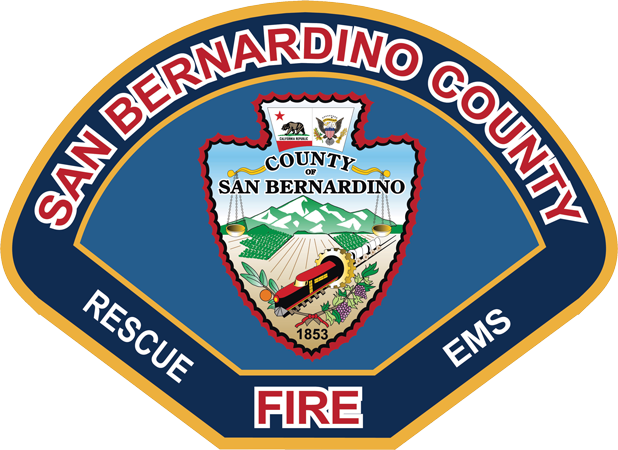
Department logo

The San Bernardino County Fire Protection District (SBCoFD) or the San Bernardino County Fire Protection District provides fire protection and emergency medical services to the unincorporated parts of the county and 24 incorporated cities. The department annexed the Crest Forest Fire Protection District on July 1, 2015; the San Bernardino City and Twentynine Palms Fire Departments on July 1, 2016; and the Upland Fire Department in July 2017. As of April 2019 the City of Victorville declined to renew their contract with The San Bernardino County Fire Department.

==== District Attorney ====
The current district attorney is Jason Anderson, who was elected in March 2018 and took office on January 1, 2019.

=== Crime ===
The following table includes the number of incidents reported and the rate per 1,000 persons for each type of offense.

Population and crime rates
Population	2,023,452	
Violent crime	10,038	4.96
Homicide	121	0.06
Forcible rape	500	0.25
Robbery	3,017	1.49
Aggravated assault	6,400	3.16
Property crime	35,314	17.45
Burglary	15,178	7.50
Larceny-theft (Note: Only larceny-theft cases involving property over $400 in value are reported as property crimes.)	31,697	15.66
Motor vehicle theft	9,730	4.81
Arson	512	0.25

On December 2, 2015, in the city of San Bernardino, terrorists attacked a staff meeting being held in the Inland Regional Center, murdering 14 people and wounding 22.

=== Cities by population and crime rates ===
Cities by population and crime rates
City	Population	Violent crimes	Violent crime rate per 1,000 persons	Property crimes	Property crime rate per 1,000 persons
Adelanto	32,520	199	6.12	924	28.41
Apple Valley	70,823	221	3.12	1,874	26.46
Barstow	23,188	207	8.93	843	36.36
Big Bear Lake	5,141	42	8.17	313	60.88
Chino	79,792	291	3.65	2,116	26.52
Chino Hills	76,632	64	0.84	956	12.48
Colton	53,431	189	3.54	1,907	35.69
Fontana	200,874	850	4.23	4,494	22.37
Grand Terrace	12,333	29	2.35	285	23.11
Hesperia	92,383	402	4.35	2,502	27.08
Highland	54,403	296	5.44	1,616	29.70
Loma Linda	23,819	43	1.81	626	26.28
Montclair	37,556	197	5.25	1,703	45.35
Needles	4,963	23	4.63	213	42.92
Ontario	167,933	534	3.18	5,056	30.11
Rancho Cucamonga	169,276	321	1.90	4,362	25.77
Redlands	70,399	221	3.14	2,992	42.50
Rialto	101,595	509	5.01	3,571	35.15
San Bernardino	214,987	2,022	9.41	10,510	48.89
Twentynine Palms	25,612	81	3.16	463	18.08
Upland	75,531	148	1.96	2,328	30.82
Victorville	118,687	676	5.70	4,465	37.62
Yucaipa	52,622	119	2.26	944	17.94
Yucca Valley	21,204	90	4.24	560	26.41

== Education ==
=== Colleges and universities ===
- Barstow Community College
- Brandman University (Ontario campus)
- California State University, San Bernardino
- California University of Science and Medicine
- Calvary Chapel Bible College In Twin Peaks, California
- Chaffey College
- Copper Mountain College
- Crafton Hills College
- Loma Linda University
- National University (campuses in Ontario and San Bernardino)
- Palo Verde Community College (Needles campus)
- San Bernardino Valley College
- University of Redlands (Main Campus)
- Victor Valley College

=== K-12 education ===
School districts are:

Unified:

- Apple Valley Unified School District
- Baker Valley Unified School District
- Barstow Unified School District
- Bear Valley Unified School District
- Beaumont Unified School District
- Chino Valley Unified School District
- Colton Joint Unified School District
- Fontana Unified School District
- Hesperia Unified School District
- Lucerne Valley Unified School District
- Morongo Unified School District
- Muroc Joint Unified School District
- Needles Unified School District
- Redlands Unified School District
- Rialto Unified School District
- Rim of the World Unified School District
- San Bernardino City Unified School District
- Sierra Sands Unified School District
- Silver Valley Unified School District
- Snowline Joint Unified School District
- Trona Joint Unified School District
- Upland Unified School District
- Yucaipa-Calimesa Joint Unified School District

Secondary:

- Chaffey Joint Union High School District
- Victor Valley Union High School District

Elementary:

- Adelanto Elementary School District
- Alta Loma School District
- Central School District
- Cucamonga School District
- Etiwanda School District
- Helendale Elementary School District
- Mountain View Elementary School District
- Mount Baldy Joint Elementary School District
- Ontario-Montclair School District
- Oro Grande Elementary School District
- Victor Elementary School District

=== Libraries ===
The San Bernardino County Library System consists of 32 branches across the county. Library services offered vary from branch to branch, but include internet access, children's story times, adult literacy services, book clubs, classes, and special events. The library system also offers e-books, digital music and movie downloads, free access to online learning through Lynda.com, and many other digital services.

City-sponsored public libraries also exist in San Bernardino County, including A. K. Smiley Public Library in Redlands, California, which was built in 1898. Other public libraries in the County include: The San Bernardino City Public Library System, Rancho Cucamonga Public Library, Upland Public Library, Colton City Library, Victorville City Library and the Ontario City Library. These libraries are separate from the county system and do not share circulation privileges.

== Arts and culture ==
The San Bernardino County Museum in Redlands is a multidisciplinary museum offering a look at the area's past with an Inland Southern California regional focus. Its exhibits and collections draw from the cultural and natural history of San Bernardino County.

Keys Desert Queen Ranch in Joshua Tree National Park has ranger-led tours to learn about the cultural history of Keys Ranch, Native American history, mining, ranching, homesteading, the Keys family, and the site's transition into a protected historical site.

Kimberly Crest House & Gardens is a 6-acre estate in Redlands with a Victorian Chateau and Italian Renaissance styled gardens. The gardens are open to the public and the house serves as a museum offering guided tours.

The Wignall Museum of Contemporary Art at Chaffey College, Rancho Cucamonga is a non-collecting institution that features temporary exhibitions of contemporary art, education and community programming.

== Transportation ==
=== Major highways ===
- I-10
- I-15
  - I-15 BL (Victorville) – unsigned
  - I-15 BL (Barstow)
  - I-15 BL (Baker) – unsigned
- I-40 (Needles Freeway)
  - I-40 BL (Needles) – unsigned
- I-215
- US 95
- US 395
- SR 2 (Angeles Crest Scenic Byway)
- SR 18
- SR 38
- SR 58 – former US 466
- SR 60 – former US 60
- SR 62
- SR 66 – former US 66
- SR 71
- SR 83
- SR 127
- SR 138
- SR 142
- SR 173
- SR 178
- SR 189
- SR 210 (Foothill Freeway)
- SR 247
- SR 259
- SR 330

=== Public transportation ===
- Metrolink commuter trains connect the urbanized portion of the county with Los Angeles, Orange, and Riverside Counties. Arrow light rail service by Metrolink is provided between Downtown San Bernardino and Redlands.
- Morongo Basin Transit Authority provides bus service in Yucca Valley, Joshua Tree and Twentynine Palms (including the Marine base). Limited service is also provided to Palm Springs.
- Mountain Transit covers the Lake Arrowhead and Big Bear regions. Limited service is also provided to Downtown San Bernardino.
- Needles Area Transit serves Needles and the surrounding county area.
- Omnitrans provides transit service in the urbanized portion of San Bernardino County, serving the City of San Bernardino, as well as the area between Montclair and Yucaipa.
- Victor Valley Transit Authority operates buses in Victorville, Hesperia, Adelanto, Apple Valley and the surrounding county area.
- Foothill Transit connects the Inland Empire area to the San Gabriel Valley and downtown Los Angeles, primarily via the hourly Silver Streak.
- RTA connects Montclair, and Anaheim to Riverside County.
- SunLine Transit Agency connects Cal State San Bernardino to Palm Springs.
- Beaumont Transit Connects Downtown San Bernardino to the city of Beaumont and Banning
- San Bernardino County is also served by Greyhound buses and Amtrak trains.

=== Airports ===
- Commercial domestic and international passenger flights are available at San Bernardino International Airport (SBD) and Ontario International Airport (ONT). SBD can be accessed from I-215 via Mill Street, I-10 via Tippecanoe Avenue, and I-210 via 3rd Street. Terminal construction recently finished, and commercial flights began in 2022. There is also a logistics center for Amazon's Amazon Air service that recently completed construction on the airport grounds.
- Southern California Logistics Airport (Victorville) is a major airplane graveyard, general aviation airport, and a Partial Air Force Installation.
- The County of San Bernardino owns six general aviation airports: Apple Valley Airport, Baker Airport, Barstow-Daggett Airport, Chino Airport, Needles Airport, and Twentynine Palms Airport.
- Other general aviation airports in the county include: Big Bear City Airport, Cable Airport (Upland), Hesperia Airport (not listed in NPIAS), and Redlands Municipal Airport

== Environmental quality ==
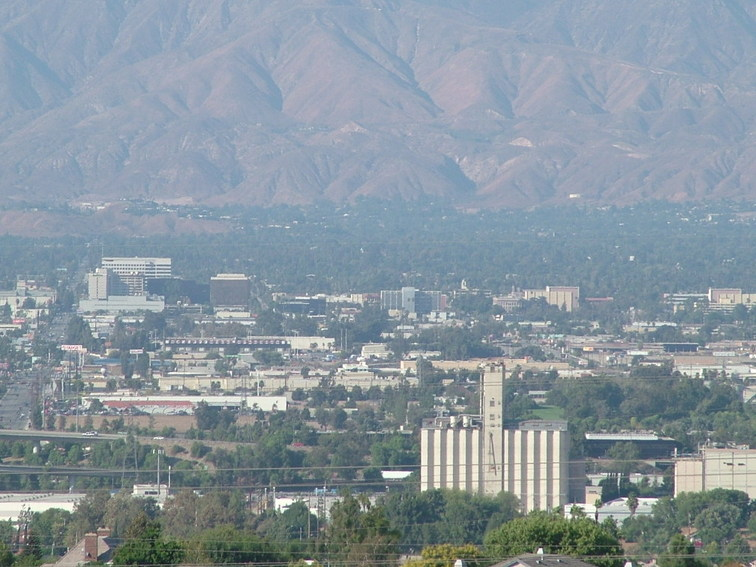
San Bernardino under heavy smog in 2005

California Attorney General Jerry Brown sued the county in April 2007 under the state's environmental quality act for failing to account for the impact of global warming in the county's 25-year growth plan, approved in March. The Center for Biological Diversity, the Sierra Club and the Audubon Society also sued in a separate case. According to Brendan Cummings, a senior attorney for the plaintiffs: "San Bernardino has never seen a project it didn't like. They rubber-stamp development. It's very much of a frontier mentality." The plaintiffs want the county to rewrite its growth plan's environmental impact statement to include methods to measure greenhouse gases and take steps to reduce them.

According to county spokesman David Wert, only 15% of the county is controlled by the county; the rest is cities and federal and state land. However, the county says it will make sure employment centers and housing are near transportation corridors to reduce traffic and do more to promote compact development and mass transit. The county budgeted $325,000 to fight the lawsuit.

The state and the county reached a settlement in August 2007. The county agreed to amend its general plan to include a Greenhouse Gas Emissions Reduction Plan, including an emission inventory and reduction targets. According to the LA Times in 2015, San Bernardino County had the highest levels of ozone in the United States, averaging 102 parts per billion.

== Health and animal services ==
San Bernardino County Animal Care operates animal shelters and covers unincorporated areas as well as Big Bear Lake, Highland, and Yucaipa. Other municipalities have their own animal service agencies.

== Communities ==
=== Cities ===
City	Year incorporated	Population, 2018	Median income, 2019	Land area sq mi (km^{2})
Adelanto	1970	34,160	$45,380	56.009 (145.062)
Apple Valley	1988	73,508	$51,314	73.193 (189.57)
Barstow	1947	23,972	$40,633	41.385 (107.186)
Big Bear Lake	1981	5,281	$51,060	6.346 (16.435)
Chino	1910	91,583	$87,090	29.639 (76.766)
Chino Hills	1991	83,447	$103,473	44.681 (115.723)
Colton	1887	54,741	$53,838	15.324 (39.689)
Fontana	1952	213,739	$80,800	42.432 (109.899)
Grand Terrace	1978	12,584	$71,788	3.502 (9.07)
Hesperia	1988	95,274	$50,271	73.096 (189.316)
Highland	1987	55,406	$64,868	18.755 (48.575)
Loma Linda	1970	24,382	$55,607	7.516 (19.467)
Montclair	1956	39,437	$62,024	5.517 (14.289)
Needles	1913	4,982	$33,717	30.808 (79.793)
Ontario	1891	181,107	$75,266	49.941 (129.345)
Rancho Cucamonga	1977	177,751	$92,773	39.851 (103.212)
Redlands	1888	71,586	$72,410	36.126 (93.565)
Rialto	1911	103,440	$70,188	22.351 (57.889)
San Bernardino	1854	215,941	$49,721	59.201 (153.33)
Twentynine Palms	1987	26,418	$44,226	59.143 (153.179)
Upland	1906	77,000	$82,426	15.617 (40.448)
Victorville	1962	122,312	$60,391	73.178 (189.529)
Yucaipa	1989	53,682	$69,104	27.888 (72.231)
Yucca Valley	1991	21,726	$44,757	40.015 (103.639)

=== Census-designated places ===
- Baker
- Big Bear City
- Big River
- Bloomington
- Bluewater
- Crestline
- Fort Irwin
- Homestead Valley
- Joshua Tree
- Lake Arrowhead
- Lenwood
- Lucerne Valley
- Lytle Creek
- Mentone
- Morongo Valley
- Mountain View Acres
- Muscoy
- Oak Glen
- Oak Hills
- Phelan
- Piñon Hills
- Running Springs
- San Antonio Heights
- Searles Valley
- Silver Lakes
- Spring Valley Lake
- Wrightwood
- Yermo

=== Unincorporated communities ===
- Amboy
- Angelus Oaks
- Argus
- Arrowbear Lake
- Arrowhead Farms
- Arrowhead Highlands
- Arrowhead Junction
- Baldwin Lake
- Baldy Mesa
- Bell Mountain
- Blue Jay
- Bryman
- Cadiz
- Cajon Junction
- Cedar Glen
- Cedarpines Park
- Cima
- Crafton
- Crest Park
- Cushenbury
- Daggett
- Danby
- Earp
- El Mirage
- Essex
- Fawnskin
- Fenner
- Forest Falls
- Goffs
- Green Valley Lake
- Halloran Springs
- Havasu Lake
- Helendale
- Hinkley
- Hodge
- Johnson Valley
- Kingston
- Kramer
- Kramer Hills
- La Delta
- Landers
- Ludlow
- Mars
- Midway
- Mojave Heights
- Mount Baldy
- Mountain Home Village
- Mountain Pass
- Narod
- Newberry Springs
- Nipton
- Oro Grande
- Parker Dam
- Patton
- Pioneer Point
- Pioneertown
- Red Mountain
- Rimforest
- Skyforest
- Sugarloaf
- Sunfair
- Sunfair Heights
- Trona
- Twentynine Palms Base
- Twin Peaks
- Venus
- Vidal
- Vidal Junction
- Wonder Valley
- Zzyzx

=== Indian reservations ===
- Chemehuevi Indian Reservation
- Colorado River Indian Reservation (partially in Riverside County, and La Paz County, Arizona)
- Fort Mojave Indian Reservation (partially in Mohave County, Arizona, and Clark County, Nevada)
- San Manuel Indian Reservation
- Twenty-Nine Palms Indian Reservation (partially in Riverside County)

=== Ghost towns ===
- Afton
- Rice
- Siberia
- Calico
- Amboy
- Ash Hill
- Ludlow
- Cadiz
- Klondike
- Ivanpah
- Keenbrook
- Cosy Dell

=== Population ranking ===
The population ranking of the following table is based on the 2026 World Population Review Census of San Bernardino County. CDP's are only from 2020 US Census.

† county seat

Rank	City/Town/etc.	Municipal type	Population (2020 Census)
1	Fontana	City	223,773
2	† San Bernardino	City	222,064
3	Ontario	City	189,505
4	Rancho Cucamonga	City	178,442
5	Victorville	City	142,992
6	Rialto	City	106,946
7	Hesperia	City	103,162
8	Chino	City	97,912
9	Upland	City	79,614
10	Chino Hills	City	77,343
11	Apple Valley	Town	75,134
12	Redlands	City	74,352
13	Highland	City	57,614
14	Yucaipa	City	54,989
15	Colton	City	53,310
16	Adelanto	City	38,874
17	Montclair	City	37,516
18	Twentynine Palms	City	25,597
19	Loma Linda	City	25,319
20	Barstow	City	24,694
21	Bloomington	CDP	24,339
22	Yucca Valley	Town	21,926
23	Phelan	CDP	13,859
24	Grand Terrace	City	12,900
25	Big Bear City	CDP	12,738
26	Lake Arrowhead	CDP	12,401
27	Crestline	CDP	11,650
28	Muscoy	CDP	10,719
29	Spring Valley Lake	CDP	9,598
30	Mentone	CDP	9,557
31	Oak Hills	CDP	9,450
32	Fort Irwin	CDP	8,096
33	Piñon Hills	CDP	7,258
34	Joshua Tree	CDP	6,489
35	Silver Lakes	CDP	6,317
36	Lucerne Valley	CDP	5,331
37	Running Springs	CDP	5,268
38	Big Bear Lake	City	5,019
39	Needles	City	4,801
40	Wrightwood	CDP	4,720
41	Lenwood	CDP	3,623
42	Morongo Valley	CDP	3,514
43	San Antonio Heights	CDP	3,441
44	Mountain View Acres	CDP	3,337
45	Homestead Valley	CDP	2,789
46	Searles Valley	CDP	1,565
47	Colorado River Indian Reservation	AIAN	1,395
48	Big River	CDP	1,084
49	Lytle Creek	CDP	725
50	Oak Glen	CDP	602
51	Baker	CDP	442
52	Chemehuevi Reservation	AIAN	464
53	Fort Mojave Indian Reservation	AIAN	253
54	San Manuel Reservation	AIAN	137
55	Bluewater	CDP	116
56	Twenty-Nine Palms Reservation	AIAN	5

== Places of interest ==
- Calico Ghost Town — northeast of Barstow via Interstate 15
- Zzyzx — a small desert settlement that used to be a health spa and is now the Desert Studies Center
- Downtown San Bernardino
- Mojave Narrows Park
- Mojave National Preserve
- Mojave Trails National Monument
- Joshua Tree National Park
- Castle Mountains National Monument
- Sand to Snow National Monument
- San Bernardino National Forest — home to Big Bear Lake outdoor activities
- SkyPark at Santa's Village
- Goldstone Deep Space Communications Complex
- Mitchell Caverns
- Snow Summit, Bear Mountain (Ski Area), and Snow Valley Mountain Resort are home to Southern California's premier winter ski resorts. Mountain High, although technically located in Los Angeles County, is also an alternative to Snow Summit and Bear Mountain because of its proximity to San Bernardino County.
- The Pacific Crest Trail, officially designated as the Pacific Crest National Scenic Trail (PCT), passes through San Bernardino County.

== See also ==
- List of California counties
- List of cemeteries in San Bernardino County
- List of museums in the Inland Empire (California)
- List of school districts in San Bernardino County, California
- National Register of Historic Places listings in San Bernardino County, California

=== Newspapers, past and present ===
- Chino Champion, Chino
- Daily Press, Victorville
- The Daily Report, Ontario
- Desert Dispatch, Barstow
- The Desert Trail, Twentynine Palms
- Fontana Herald, Fontana
- Hi-Desert Star, Yucca Valley
- Inland Valley Daily Bulletin, Rancho Cucamonga
- News Mirror, Yucaipa
- Redlands Daily Facts, Redlands
- The San Bernardino Sun, San Bernardino
- Big Bear Grizzly, Big Bear Lake
- Upland News, Upland
- Highland Newsletter, Highland
