= Hi-Desert Star =

Newspaper in Yucca Valley, California

- People you know, news you can trust
- Type: Weekly newspaper
- Owner: Gold Mountain California News Media Inc.
- Publisher: Terri Leifeste
- Editor: Stacy Moore
- Founded: 1957
- Language: English
- Headquarters: 57675 29 Palms Highway Suite 103, Yucca Valley, California 92284; U.S.
- Website: hidesertstar.com

The Hi-Desert Star is a newspaper published and distributed in Yucca Valley, Morongo Valley, and Pioneertown, located within the southern Mojave Desert in San Bernardino County, California.

== History ==
On April 3, 1957, the first edition of The Desert Star was published in Yucca Valley. It was sponsored by the Yucca Valley Chamber of Commerce.

The paper's name was later changed after four months to the Hi-Desert Star after it was discovered that there was already a Desert Star newspaper that had been published in nearby Needles, California for the previous 40 years. Ironically, the paper was later sold to the owners of the Desert Star.

In 1970, the Hi-Desert Star and Yucca Valley News were acquired by the W.J. McGiffin Newspaper Company. In 1982, the company's name was changed to Brehm Communications, Inc. In September 2022, Hi-Desert Star and nine other newspapers owned by Brehm were sold to Gold Mountain California News Media Inc.

== Other publications ==
The Hi-Desert Star also publishes:

- The Desert Trail, Twentynine Palms
- Desert Entertainer
- Desert Mobile Home News

Hi-Desert Publishing's Mountain Division also publishes the Mountain News in Lake Arrowhead and the Big Bear Grizzly in Big Bear Lake.
