= Bluewater, California =

Bluewater
- census-designated place
- Location in San Bernardino County and the state of California

- Location in the United States
- Coordinates: 34°10′49″N 114°15′2″W
- Country: United States
- State: California
- County: San Bernardino

Area
  - Total: 1.34 sq mi (3.48 km^{2})
  - Land: 1.05 sq mi (2.71 km^{2})
  - Water: 0.30 sq mi (0.77 km^{2}) 33.58%
- Elevation: 367 ft (112 m)

Population (2020)
  - Total: 116
  - Density: 110.8/sq mi (42.78/km^{2})
- Time zone: UTC-8 (PST)
  - Summer (DST): UTC-7 (PDT)
- ZIP code: 92363
- Area codes: 442/760
- FIPS code: 06-07172
- GNIS feature ID: 1867001

Bluewater is a census-designated place (CDP) in San Bernardino County, California, United States. The population was 116 at the 2020 census, down from 172 at the 2010 census.

== Geography ==
Bluewater is located at 34°10′49″N 114°15′2″W (34.180214, -114.250531).

According to the United States Census Bureau, the CDP has a total area of 1.3 square miles (3.4 km^{2}). 1.0 square mile (2.6 km^{2}) of it is land and 0.3 square miles (0.78 km^{2}) of it (22.0%) is water.

=== Climate ===
This area has a large amount of sunshine year round due to its stable descending air and high pressure. According to the Köppen Climate Classification system, Bluewater has a desert climate, abbreviated "Bwh" on climate maps.

== Demographics ==
Historical population
Census	Pop.	Note	%±
1990	261		—
2000	265		1.5%
2010	172		−35.1%
2020	116		−32.6%
U.S. Decennial Census; 1850–1870 1880-1890; 1900 1910 1920; 1930 1940 1950; 1960 1970 1980; 1990 2000 2010

Bluewater was first listed as a census designated place in the 1990 U.S. census.

=== Racial and ethnic composition ===
Bluewater CDP, California – Racial and ethnic composition Note: the US Census treats Hispanic/Latino as an ethnic category. This table excludes Latinos from the racial categories and assigns them to a separate category. Hispanics/Latinos may be of any race.
Race / Ethnicity (NH = Non-Hispanic)	Pop 2000	Pop 2010	Pop 2020	% 2000	% 2010	% 2020
White alone (NH)	259	154	97	97.74%	89.53%	83.62%
Black or African American alone (NH)	1	2	0	0.38%	1.16%	0.00%
Native American or Alaska Native alone (NH)	1	1	2	0.38%	0.58%	1.72%
Asian alone (NH)	0	0	0	0.00%	0.00%	0.00%
Native Hawaiian or Pacific Islander alone (NH)	0	1	0	0.00%	0.58%	0.00%
Other race alone (NH)	0	0	0	0.00%	0.00%	0.00%
Mixed race or Multiracial (NH)	0	3	7	0.00%	1.74%	6.03%
Hispanic or Latino (any race)	4	11	10	1.51%	6.40%	8.62%
Total	265	172	116	100.00%	100.00%	100.00%

=== 2020 census ===
As of the 2020 census, Bluewater had a population of 116. The population density was 110.8 inhabitants per square mile (42.8/km^{2}). The median age was 62.3 years. The age distribution was 8 people (6.9%) under the age of 18, 0 people (0.0%) aged 18 to 24, 12 people (10.3%) aged 25 to 44, 42 people (36.2%) aged 45 to 64, and 54 people (46.6%) who were 65 years of age or older. There were 49 males and 67 females; for every 100 females there were 73.1 males, and for every 100 females age 18 and over there were 74.2 males age 18 and over.

1.7% of residents lived in urban areas, while 98.3% lived in rural areas.

The whole population lived in households. There were 67 households in Bluewater, of which 13.4% had children under the age of 18 living in them. Of all households, 41.8% were married-couple households, 4.5% were cohabiting couple households, 26.9% were households with a male householder and no spouse or partner present, and 26.9% were households with a female householder and no spouse or partner present. About 41.8% of all households were made up of individuals and 20.9% had someone living alone who was 65 years of age or older. The average household size was 1.73. There were 32 families (47.8% of all households).

There were 424 housing units at an average density of 405.0 units per square mile (156.4 units/km^{2}), of which 84.2% were vacant. Of occupied units, 62 (92.5%) were owner-occupied and 5 (7.5%) were occupied by renters. The homeowner vacancy rate was 1.6% and the rental vacancy rate was 16.7%.

Racial composition as of the 2020 census
Race	Number	Percent
White	97	83.6%
Black or African American	0	0.0%
American Indian and Alaska Native	4	3.4%
Asian	0	0.0%
Native Hawaiian and Other Pacific Islander	0	0.0%
Some other race	6	5.2%
Two or more races	9	7.8%

== Government ==
In the California State Legislature, Bluewater is in the 18th senatorial district, represented by Democrat Steve Padilla, and in the 36th Assembly district, represented by Republican Jeff Gonzalez.

In the United States House of Representatives, Bluewater is in California's 25th congressional district, represented by Democrat Raul Ruiz.
