= Narod, California =

Unincorporated community in California, United States

- Unincorporated community
- Location of Narod in San Bernardino County, California

- Location in the United States Narod, California (the United States)
- Coordinates: 34°3′29″N 117°41′4″W
- Country: United States
- State: California
- County: San Bernardino

Area
  - Total: 0.39 sq mi (1.0 km^{2})
- Elevation: 955 ft (291 m)

Population
  - Estimate (2020): 1,691
  - Density: 4,336/sq mi (1,674/km^{2})
- Time zone: UTC-8 (PST)
  - Summer (DST): UTC-7 (PDT)
- ZIP code: 91762
- Area code: 909
- GNIS feature ID: 1661089

Narod is an unincorporated community in southwestern San Bernardino County, California, United States, located 35 miles (56 km) east of downtown Los Angeles, with an estimated population of 1,691 as of 2020. Although Narod is not an official census-designated place, it appears on the list of unincorporated areas and street maps in San Bernardino County, according to the United States Geological Survey. It appears on the Ontario U.S. Geological Survey Map.

== Etymology ==
The area is thought to have taken its name from a railroad executive named A.E. Doran, who reversed his name. According to local historical accounts, when the Southern Pacific Transportation Company extended its tracks through the area, A.E. Doran had the task of naming the various sidings and stations along the route. Having already named another siding for himself, he reversed the letters of his name to create “Narod.”

== History ==
In May 1923, the Union Pacific Railroad briefly renamed its station at the location “Sunsweet.” Local residents objected and voted to adopt the name “Monte Vista.” The community later reverted to the name Narod in 1929.

Today, most of what was the historical Narod area has now been incorporated into the neighboring city of Montclair, while the remainder remains unincorporated, constituting the present-day community of Narod, and addresses in the community show "Ontario" as the place name, due to it bordering the city of Ontario to the east. The community also borders Montclair to the north and west, and Chino to the south. Most of the historic Narod area has been absorbed into Montclair, while the remaining unincorporated portion continues to use Ontario as its mailing address.

== Geography ==
Narod is located at 34°3′29″N 117°41′4″W (34.0580666, −117.6844996), at an elevation of 955 feet (291 m). Narod has a total area of 0.39 square miles (1.0 km^{2}).

== Government and infrastructure ==
In the California State Legislature, Narod is in the 22nd senatorial district, represented by Democrat Susan Rubio, and in the 55th Assembly district, represented by Democrat Isaac Bryan. In the United States House of Representatives, it is in California's 35th congressional district, represented by Democrat Norma Torres.

=== Education ===
Narod is served by the Ontario-Montclair School District.
