= Morongo Unified School District =

School district in California

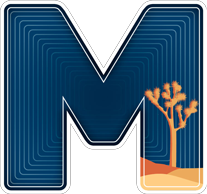
- Morongo Unified School District Icon

Address
- 5715 Utah Trail Twentynine Palms, California; United States
- Coordinates: 34°09′14″N 116°02′14″W

District information
- Type: Public
- Grades: K–12
- NCES District ID: 0625860

Students and staff
- Students: 8,005 (2020–2021)
- Teachers: 365.51 (FTE)
- Staff: 424.54 (FTE)
- Student–teacher ratio: 21.9:1
- District mascot: Bobcat
- Colors: Green, White, Black

Other information
- Website: www.morongo.k12.ca.us

The Morongo Unified School District (MUSD) is a public education governing body in the Mojave high desert of Southern California. MUSD has more than 1,100 employees who provide educational services to 9,301 students.

== Summary ==
The MUSD serves the city of Twentynine Palms, the town of Yucca Valley and the CDPs of Homestead Valley, Joshua Tree and Morongo Valley.

Currently, MUSD has eleven elementary schools, two middle schools, two comprehensive high schools, two continuation high schools, two state preschool programs, and a special education preschool program. Administrative offices are located in Twentynine Palms.

== Schools ==
=== Elementary ===
- Condor Elementary School (in Twentynine Palms US Marine Corps Base).
- Friendly Hills Elementary School (Grades K-7) - opened in 1990s.
- Joshua Tree Elementary School (current campus opened in 2013).
- Landers Elementary School - opened in 2000s.
- Morongo Valley Elementary School - opened in 1970s.
- Oasis Elementary School, Twentynine Palms - opened in 1960s.
- Onaga Elementary School, Yucca Valley - opened in 2000s.
- Palm Vista Elementary School, Twentynine Palms -(expected to close) opened in 1960s.
- Twentynine Palms Elementary School - opened in 1950s.
- Yucca Mesa Elementary School (Grades K-8) - opened in 2000s.
- Yucca Valley Elementary School (oldest in district, was Central Public School).

=== Middle ===
- La Contenta Middle School, Yucca Valley - opened in 1991
- Twentynine Palms Junior High School - original Elem/Jr High/Sr High school in town - opened in 1950s

=== High ===
- Twentynine Palms High School - opened late 1960s
- Yucca Valley High School - opened 1968
- Black Rock High School (continuation)
