= Arrowhead Farms, California =

Unincorporated community in California, United States

Arrowhead Farms
- Unincorporated community
- Location within the state of California Arrowhead Farms (the United States)
- Coordinates: 34°17′2″N 117°30′3″W
- Country: United States
- State: California
- County: San Bernardino County
- Time zone: UTC-8 (Pacific (PST))
  - Summer (DST): UTC-7 (PDT)
- ZIP codes: 92407
- Area code: 909

Arrowhead Farms is an unincorporated community of San Bernardino County, California, United States. It is an enclave of the city of San Bernardino located just northeast of the Interstate 215 and Interstate 210 junction. Arrowhead Farms is in the 92407 ZIP Code and is within the 909 area code.
