= Montclair, California =

City in California, United States

- City
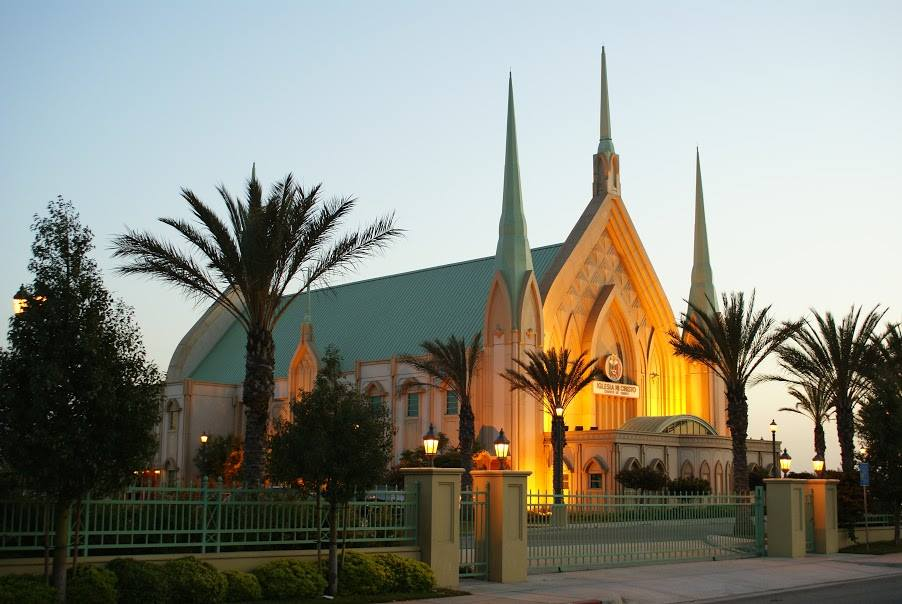
- Iglesia Ni Cristo chapel
- Interactive map of Montclair, California
- Location in Greater Los Angeles Location in Southern California Location in California Location in the United States
- Coordinates: 34°04′39″N 117°41′23″W
- Country: United States
- State: California
- County: San Bernardino
- Incorporated: April 25, 1956

Government
  - Mayor: Javier "John" Dutrey
  - City Manager: Edward C. Starr

Area
  - Total: 5.53 sq mi (14.33 km^{2})
  - Land: 5.53 sq mi (14.33 km^{2})
  - Water: 0 sq mi (0.00 km^{2}) 0%
- Elevation: 1,066 ft (325 m)

Population (2020)
  - Total: 37,865
  - Density: 6,844/sq mi (2,642/km^{2})
- Time zone: UTC-8 (PST)
  - Summer (DST): UTC-7 (PDT)
- ZIP Code: 91763
- Area code: 909
- FIPS code: 06-48788
- GNIS feature IDs: 252320, 2411141
- Website: www.cityofmontclair.org

Montclair is a city in the Inland Empire, in southwestern San Bernardino County, California, 30 miles (48 km) east of Los Angeles. The population was 37,865 in the 2020 United States census.

== History ==
The earliest known inhabitants of the area were from the Serrano tribe of Native Americans. The Serrano established their village along a creek named Arroyo de los Alisos, now named San Antonio Creek, which flowed along a route that is now Mills Avenue, the western border of the city.

In 1897, a "Township of Marquette" was founded within the borders of the modern city of Montclair. In 1900, a 1,000 acres (4.0 km^{2}) tract of land was surveyed and named "Monte Vista". A small settlement to the south of Monte Vista was established in 1907 and named "Narod". Throughout the first half of the 20th century, the settlement was largely devoted to citrus orchards. The Monte Vista tract experienced growth in residential development after the Second World War, and the tract was incorporated as the city of Monte Vista on April 25, 1956. Due to conflict with the Post Office, which refused to open an office in Monte Vista due to a name conflict with a community in Northern California, the city was renamed Montclair on April 8, 1958.

== Geography ==
Montclair is bordered by Pomona to the west, Claremont and Upland to the north, Ontario to the east, and Chino to the south. Montclair, which is on the border with Los Angeles County, is in the Pomona Valley and part of the Inland Empire region.

The San Bernardino Freeway (I-10) runs through the northern part of the city.

== Demographics ==
Historical population
Census	Pop.	Note	%±
1960	13,546		—
1970	22,546		66.4%
1980	22,628		0.4%
1990	28,434		25.7%
2000	33,049		16.2%
2010	36,664		10.9%
2020	37,865		3.3%
U.S. Decennial Census

=== Racial and ethnic composition ===
Montclair city, California – Racial and ethnic composition Note: the US Census treats Hispanic/Latino as an ethnic category. This table excludes Latinos from the racial categories and assigns them to a separate category. Hispanics/Latinos may be of any race.
Race / Ethnicity (NH = Non-Hispanic)	Pop 2000	Pop 2010	Pop 2020	% 2000	% 2010	% 2020
White alone (NH)	7,784	5,293	4,000	23.55%	14.44%	10.56%
Black or African American alone (NH)	1,986	1,702	1,538	6.01%	4.64%	4.06%
Native American or Alaska Native alone (NH)	124	93	76	0.38%	0.25%	0.20%
Asian alone (NH)	2,641	3,275	4,241	7.99%	8.93%	11.20%
Native Hawaiian or Pacific Islander alone (NH)	84	60	42	0.25%	0.16%	0.11%
Other race alone (NH)	37	63	142	0.11%	0.17%	0.38%
Mixed race or Multiracial (NH)	570	434	604	1.72%	1.18%	1.60%
Hispanic or Latino (any race)	19,823	25,744	27,222	59.98%	70.22%	71.89%
Total	33,049	36,664	37,865	100.00%	100.00%	100.00%

=== 2020 census ===
As of the 2020 census, Montclair had a population of 37,865 and a population density of 6,846.0 inhabitants per square mile (2,643.3/km^{2}). The median age was 34.1 years; 24.6% of residents were under age 18 and 11.6% were age 65 or older. For every 100 females, there were 98.0 males, and for every 100 females age 18 and over, there were 95.4 males.

The census reported that 99.3% of the population lived in households, 0.3% lived in non-institutionalized group quarters, and 0.4% were institutionalized. In addition, 100.0% of residents lived in urban areas, while 0.0% lived in rural areas.

There were 10,557 households, of which 45.6% had children under the age of 18 living in them. Of all households, 49.5% were married-couple households, 7.9% were cohabiting couple households, 26.2% had a female householder with no spouse or partner present, and 16.4% had a male householder with no spouse or partner present. About 14.5% of all households were one person households, and 6.2% had someone living alone who was age 65 or older. The average household size was 3.56, and there were 8,428 families (79.8% of all households).

There were 10,816 housing units, of which 10,557 (97.6%) were occupied. Of occupied units, 54.8% were owner-occupied and 45.2% were occupied by renters. The homeowner vacancy rate was 0.6%, and the rental vacancy rate was 2.4%.

Racial composition as of the 2020 census
Race	Number	Percent
White	7,741	20.4%
Black or African American	1,652	4.4%
American Indian and Alaska Native	953	2.5%
Asian	4,366	11.5%
Native Hawaiian and Other Pacific Islander	65	0.2%
Some other race	16,132	42.6%
Two or more races	6,956	18.4%

=== 2023 ACS 5-year estimates ===
In 2023, the US Census Bureau estimated that 31.0% of the population were foreign-born. Of all people aged 5 or older, 42.6% spoke only English at home, 47.1% spoke Spanish, 1.1% spoke other Indo-European languages, 8.6% spoke Asian or Pacific Islander languages, and 0.7% spoke other languages. Of those aged 25 or older, 73.3% were high school graduates and 17.8% had a bachelor's degree.

The median household income in 2023 was $76,338, and the per capita income was $26,889. About 13.7% of families and 16.7% of the population were below the poverty line.

=== 2010 census ===
At the 2010 census Montclair had a population of 36,664. The population density was 6,645.4 inhabitants per square mile (2,565.8/km^{2}). The racial makeup of Montclair was 19,337 (52.7%) White (14.4% Non-Hispanic White), 1,908 (5.2%) African American, 434 (1.2%) Native American, 3,425 (9.3%) Asian, 74 (0.2%) Pacific Islander, 9,882 (27.0%) from other races, and 1,604 (4.4%) from two or more races. Hispanic or Latino of any race were 25,744 persons (70.2%).

The census reported that 36,268 people (98.9% of the population) lived in households, 215 (0.6%) lived in non-institutionalized group quarters, and 181 (0.5%) were institutionalized.

There were 9,523 households, 4,954 (52.0%) had children under the age of 18 living in them, 5,094 (53.5%) were opposite-sex married couples living together, 1,781 (18.7%) had a female householder with no husband present, 901 (9.5%) had a male householder with no wife present. There were 690 (7.2%) unmarried opposite-sex partnerships, and 77 (0.8%) same-sex married couples or partnerships. 1,240 households (13.0%) were one person and 524 (5.5%) had someone living alone who was 65 or older. The average household size was 3.81. There were 7,776 families (81.7% of households); the average family size was 4.09.

The age distribution was 10,756 people (29.3%) under the age of 18, 4,300 people (11.7%) aged 18 to 24, 10,694 people (29.2%) aged 25 to 44, 7,831 people (21.4%) aged 45 to 64, and 3,083 people (8.4%) who were 65 or older. The median age was 30.7 years. For every 100 females, there were 99.1 males. For every 100 females age 18 and over, there were 96.8 males.

There were 9,911 housing units at an average density of 1,796.4 per square mile, of the occupied units 5,683 (59.7%) were owner-occupied and 3,840 (40.3%) were rented. The homeowner vacancy rate was 2.0%; the rental vacancy rate was 4.6%. 21,076 people (57.5% of the population) lived in owner-occupied housing units and 15,192 people (41.4%) lived in rental housing units.

== Government ==
The current mayor is Javier "John" Dutrey, and the other members of the city council are Mayor Pro-Tem Corysa Martinez, and Councilmen Bill Ruh, Benjamin "Ben" Lopez and Xavier Mendez

The City of Montclair is a General Law City and operates as a City Council-City Manager form of government, which the City Manager manages the day-to-day operations. The City Council meeting is held on the first and third Monday of each month beginning at 7:00 p.m.

In the California State Legislature, Montclair is in the 22nd senatorial district, represented by Democrat Susan Rubio, and in the 53rd Assembly district, represented by Democrat Michelle Rodriguez.

In the United States House of Representatives, Montclair is in California's 35th congressional district, represented by Democrat Norma Torres.

== Transportation ==
The Montclair Transit Center is a major commuter bus and rail hub, where many daily Metrolink, Foothill Transit, and Omnitrans connections are available to downtown Los Angeles, downtown San Bernardino, and points in between. The Silver Streak bus rapid transit serves the city at the Transit Center and at a stop outside the Montclair Place mall.

== Notable people ==
- Danny Califf (born 1980), soccer player
- Terry Kirkman (born 1939), retired Vocalist and Wind Instruments for The Association.
- Nick Rimando (born 1979), soccer player
- Matt Wise (born 1975), retired Major League Baseball pitcher and bullpen coach for the Los Angeles Angels
- Vince Velasquez (born 1992), Major League Baseball pitcher for the Philadelphia Phillies
