= Morongo Valley, California =

- census-designated place
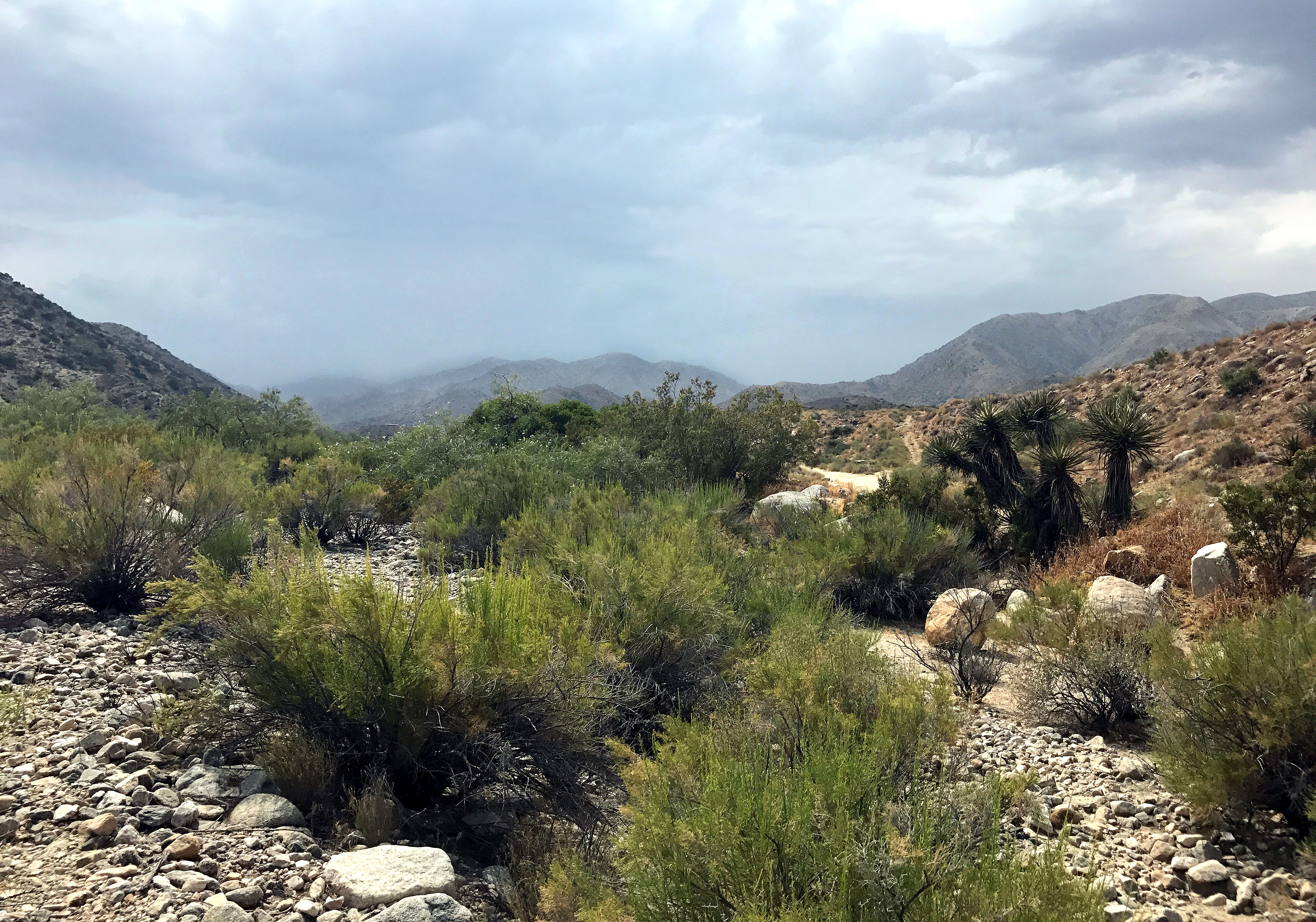
- Little Morongo Canyon, Morongo Valley, California

- Location in San Bernardino County and the state of California

- Location in the United States
- Coordinates: 34°02′49″N 116°34′51″W
- Country: United States
- State: California
- County: San Bernardino

Area
  - Total: 25.219 sq mi (65.317 km^{2})
  - Land: 25.219 sq mi (65.317 km^{2})
  - Water: 0 sq mi (0 km^{2}) 0%
- Elevation: 2,582 ft (787 m)

Population (2020)
  - Total: 3,514
  - Density: 139.3/sq mi (53.80/km^{2})
- Time zone: UTC-8 (PST)
  - Summer (DST): UTC-7 (PDT)
- ZIP code: 92256
- Area codes: 442/760
- FIPS code: 06-49348
- GNIS feature ID: 1652755

Morongo Valley is a census-designated place (CDP) on State Route 62 in San Bernardino County, California, United States. The population was 3,514 at the 2020 census, down from 3,552 at the 2010 census. The town is bordered by Yucca Valley, California.

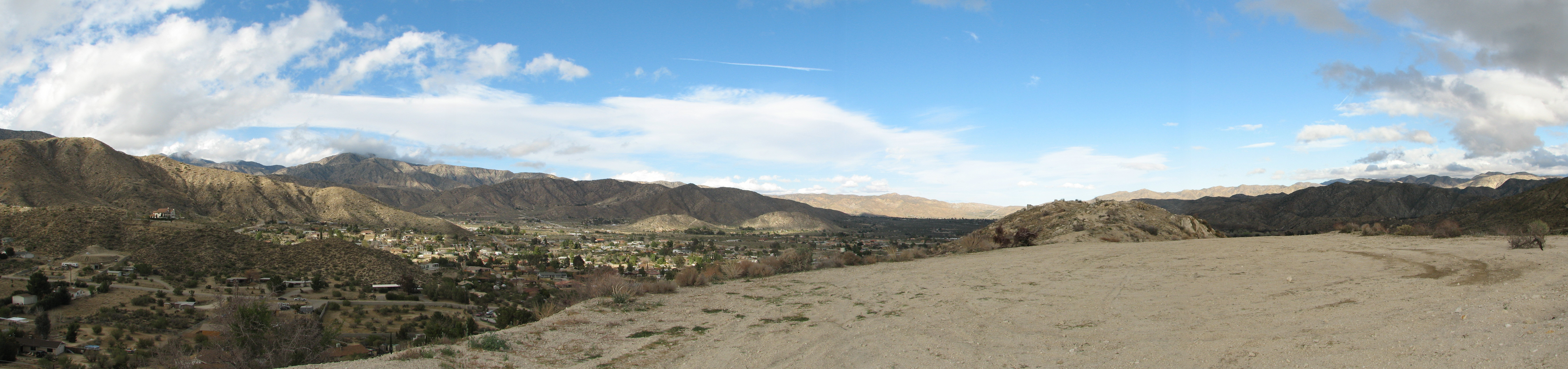
Morongo Valley looking northeast

== Geography and climate ==
Morongo Valley is located on State Route 62, about 10 miles (16 km) west of Yucca Valley.

Morongo Valley lies along the western edge of the Mojave Desert and near the northern edge of the Coachella Valley, and as such is generally dry. Monsoonal moisture leads to thunderstorms at times during the summer, but in the winter, Pacific storms bring most of the rain. According to the United States Census Bureau, the CDP has a total area of 25.2 square miles (65 km^{2}), all land.

== Demographics ==
Historical population
Census	Pop.	Note	%±
1980	1,137		—
1990	1,544		35.8%
2000	1,929		24.9%
2010	3,552		84.1%
2020	3,514		−1.1%
U.S. Decennial Census; 1850–1870 1880-1890; 1900 1910 1920; 1930 1940 1950; 1960 1970 1980; 1990 2000 2010

Morongo Valley was first listed as a census designated place in the 1980 U.S. census.

=== 2020 census ===
As of the 2020 census, Morongo Valley had a population of 3,514 and a population density of 139.3 inhabitants per square mile (53.8/km^{2}). The age distribution was 16.1% under the age of 18, 5.4% aged 18 to 24, 23.2% aged 25 to 44, 32.3% aged 45 to 64, and 22.9% who were 65 years of age or older. The median age was 49.8 years. For every 100 females, there were 101.7 males, and for every 100 females age 18 and over there were 103.2 males age 18 and over.

0.0% of residents lived in urban areas, while 100.0% lived in rural areas.

The whole population lived in households. There were 1,624 households, of which 18.0% had children under the age of 18 living in them. Of all households, 34.1% were married-couple households, 8.7% were cohabiting couple households, 28.9% had a female householder with no spouse or partner present, and 28.3% had a male householder with no spouse or partner present. About 39.3% of households were one-person households, and 16.3% had someone living alone who was 65 years of age or older. The average household size was 2.16. There were 827 families (50.9% of all households).

There were 1,960 housing units at an average density of 77.7 units per square mile (30.0 units/km^{2}). Of these, 1,624 (82.9%) were occupied and 336 (17.1%) were vacant. Of occupied units, 74.4% were owner-occupied and 25.6% were occupied by renters. The homeowner vacancy rate was 1.9% and the rental vacancy rate was 5.6%.

Racial composition as of the 2020 census
Race	Number	Percent
White	2,592	73.8%
Black or African American	58	1.7%
American Indian and Alaska Native	66	1.9%
Asian	62	1.8%
Native Hawaiian and Other Pacific Islander	7	0.2%
Some other race	310	8.8%
Two or more races	419	11.9%
Hispanic or Latino (of any race)	735	20.9%

=== Income and poverty ===
In 2023, the US Census Bureau estimated that the median household income was $56,821, and the per capita income was $33,049. About 18.3% of families and 22.9% of the population were below the poverty line.

=== 2010 census ===
At the 2010 census Morongo Valley had a population of 3,552. The population density was 140.8 inhabitants per square mile (54.4/km^{2}). The racial makeup of Morongo Valley was 3,076 (86.6%) White (79.1% Non-Hispanic White), 40 (1.1%) African American, 73 (2.1%) Native American, 31 (0.9%) Asian, 4 (0.1%) Pacific Islander, 187 (5.3%) from other races, and 141 (4.0%) from two or more races. Hispanic or Latino of any race were 531 people (14.9%).

The census reported that 3,547 people (99.9% of the population) lived in households, 5 (0.1%) lived in non-institutionalized group quarters, and no one was institutionalized.

There were 1,602 households, 359 (22.4%) had children under the age of 18 living in them, 598 (37.3%) were opposite-sex married couples living together, 178 (11.1%) had a female householder with no husband present, 99 (6.2%) had a male householder with no wife present. There were 132 (8.2%) unmarried opposite-sex partnerships, and 26 (1.6%) same-sex married couples or partnerships. 554 households (34.6%) were one person and 203 (12.7%) had someone living alone who was 65 or older. The average household size was 2.21. There were 875 families (54.6% of households); the average family size was 2.87.

The age distribution was 646 people (18.2%) under the age of 18, 266 people (7.5%) aged 18 to 24, 745 people (21.0%) aged 25 to 44, 1,346 people (37.9%) aged 45 to 64, and 549 people (15.5%) who were 65 or older. The median age was 47.2 years. For every 100 females, there were 105.6 males. For every 100 females age 18 and over, there were 106.0 males.

There were 2,004 housing units at an average density of 79.5 per square mile, of the occupied units 1,159 (72.3%) were owner-occupied and 443 (27.7%) were rented. The homeowner vacancy rate was 4.7%; the rental vacancy rate was 7.9%. 2,489 people (70.1% of the population) lived in owner-occupied housing units and 1,058 people (29.8%) lived in rental housing units.

According to the 2010 United States Census, Morongo Valley had a median household income of $32,337, with 25.3% of the population living below the federal poverty line.

== Infrastructure ==
=== Local ===
Morongo Valley is unincorporated and is under the jurisdiction of San Bernardino County; it lies immediately north of the Riverside County line. The main commercial development of Morongo Valley lies along Highway 62 approximately 10 miles (16 km) north of Interstate 10 and is the first San Bernardino County town travelers encounter when driving north from the Coachella Valley. A popular destination in Morongo Valley is the Big Morongo Canyon Preserve, where one can take hikes, go bird-watching or stroll along the walkways. The governing body of Morongo Valley is the Community Services District (CSD), which has five board members. The only school in Morongo Valley is Morongo Valley Elementary School (MVES), which is part of the Morongo Unified School District. MVES has an enrollment of a few hundred students.

=== State and federal representation ===
In the California State Legislature, Morongo Valley is in the 19th senatorial district, represented by Republican Rosilicie Ochoa Bogh, and in the 47th Assembly district, represented by Republican Greg Wallis.

In the United States House of Representatives, Morongo Valley is in California's 23rd congressional district, represented by Republican Jay Obernolte.

== Paradise Fire ==
In June 2005, a fire started on Paradise Avenue in western Morongo Valley. This fire quickly spread, torching about six thousand acres (24 km^{2}). The fire burned seven homes and also damaged some of the walkways in the Big Morongo Canyon Preserve. All damage has since been repaired and the preserve remains open for birding and hiking.

== Sawtooth Complex Fire ==
In July 2006, a fire started by dry lightning in Yucca Valley was almost 100 percent contained, however due to extremely low humidity, high temperatures, and 40-mile-per-hour (64 km/h) gusts, the fire grew. The fire quickly spread from Yucca Valley through Pioneertown and Big Morongo. In fact, another small fire dubbed the Millard Complex fire merged with the Sawtooth Complex fire. Well over 100 structures were burned in the two fires, although virtually no damage occurred in Morongo Valley itself.

== Notable residents ==
- President of Focus on the Family Jim Daly has stated that he lived in foster care here for a period as a child immediately following the death of his mother, and that he attended Morongo Valley Elementary School
- Professional downhill mountain biker Aaron Gwin was born here.
- Upon his retirement actor Guy Madison built a large ranch house on 10 acres (4 ha) in Morongo Valley.
- Native American actor Steve Reevis resided here.
- Country music singer Leah Turner is originally from here.
- Musician Gene Parsons was born here.
