= Homestead Valley, San Bernardino County, California =

Homestead Valley
- census-designated place
- Location in San Bernardino County and the state of California

- Position in California.
- Coordinates: 34°16′31″N 116°24′13″W
- Country: United States
- State: California
- County: San Bernardino

Area
  - Total: 33.856 sq mi (87.687 km^{2})
  - Land: 33.856 sq mi (87.687 km^{2})
  - Water: 0 sq mi (0 km^{2}) 0%
- Elevation: 3,022 ft (921 m)

Population (2020)
  - Total: 2,789
  - Density: 82.38/sq mi (31.81/km^{2})
- Time zone: UTC-8 (Pacific (PST))
  - Summer (DST): UTC-7 (PDT)
- GNIS feature ID: 2629366

Homestead Valley is a census-designated place in San Bernardino County, California. Homestead Valley sits at an elevation of 3,022 feet (921 m). The 2020 United States census reported Homestead Valley's population was 2,789. The CDP includes the unincorporated community of Landers.

== Geography ==
According to the United States Census Bureau, the CDP covers an area of 33.9 square miles (87.7 km^{2}), all of it land.

== Demographics ==
Historical population
Census	Pop.	Note	%±
2010	3,032		—
2020	2,789		−8.0%
U.S. Decennial Census; 1850–1870 1880-1890; 1900 1910 1920; 1930 1940 1950; 1960 1970 1980; 1990 2000 2010

Homestead Valley first appeared as a census designated place in the 2010 U.S. census.

The 2020 United States census reported that Homestead Valley had a population of 2,789. The population density was 82.4 inhabitants per square mile (31.8/km^{2}). The racial makeup of Homestead Valley was 74.8% White, 1.4% African American, 1.9% Native American, 3.0% Asian, 0.2% Pacific Islander, 8.0% from other races, and 10.7% from two or more races. Hispanic or Latino of any race were 20.2% of the population.

The whole population lived in households. There were 1,254 households, out of which 16.3% included children under the age of 18, 33.2% were married-couple households, 8.6% were cohabiting couple households, 27.1% had a female householder with no partner present, and 31.1% had a male householder with no partner present. 38.5% of households were one person, and 19.4% were one person aged 65 or older. The average household size was 2.22. There were 654 families (52.2% of all households).

The age distribution was 14.3% under the age of 18, 4.8% aged 18 to 24, 20.8% aged 25 to 44, 32.7% aged 45 to 64, and 27.4% who were 65 years of age or older. The median age was 53.8 years. For every 100 females, there were 106.6 males.

There were 2,033 housing units at an average density of 60.0 units per square mile (23.2 units/km^{2}), of which 1,254 (61.7%) were occupied. Of these, 75.6% were owner-occupied, and 24.4% were occupied by renters.

In 2023, the US Census Bureau estimated that the median household income was $39,954, and the per capita income was $23,380. About 15.6% of families and 32.2% of the population were below the poverty line.
