= Summit Heights =

Coordinates: 34.1421°N 117.4743°W

Summit Heights, Fontana, CA
- Interactive map of Summit Heights, Fontana, CA
- Country: United States
- State: California
- County: San Bernardino County, California
- Established: 2002

Area
  - Total: .537 sq mi (1.39 km^{2})
  - Land: .537 sq mi (1.39 km^{2})
- ZIP Code: 92336
- Website: Official website

Summit Heights is a planned community in north Fontana, California.

== History ==
Summit Heights is a 316-acre master-planned community in Fontana, California adjacent to Etiwanda, Rancho Cucamonga, California. Located along Summit Avenue and Beech Avenue, construction of the community began in 2002 on a portion of the community. Homes in this community have been built by PulteGroup, KB Home, and Hovnanian Enterprises

== Geography ==
Summit Heights is at the base of the San Gabriel Mountains and is in between Interstate 15 and Interstate 210 forming a triangle.

=== Design and development ===
The Summit Heights development is divided into six "block". Throughout all the blocks there are a total of 1,051 single-family residential lots with various lot sizes. Home sizes in this community range from 1,200 sq. feet to 3,200 square feet. Houses

Summit Heights also has two neighboring shopping centers, Summit Heights Gateway and Falcon Ridge Town Center.

The community also has 2 park within the boundaries and a water park, skate park, and dog park titled Fontana Park to the north-east on Summit Avenue, with a lifestyle center called the Jessie Turner Center.

== Demographics ==
In the community, the median household income is about $102,000 annually. The average priced home is $300,000 to $400,000 depending on sq. footage and number of bedrooms.

=== 2010 ===
65% of all residents in Summit Heights are Hispanic with 20% being white and 15% another race according to City Data for Summit Heights

== Education ==
The community is served by the Etiwanda School District and Chaffey Joint Union High School District. A branch of the San Bernardino Public Library is located on the east outskirt of the neighborhood.

Etiwanda Colony and Summit Intermediate both serve elementary and middle school students in the community. Etiwanda High School serves grades 9-12.

Etiwanda Colony has been named a California Distinguished School and Summit Intermediate has been named a National School to Watch and California Distinguished School.
