= Tapia Adobe =

California Historic Landmark

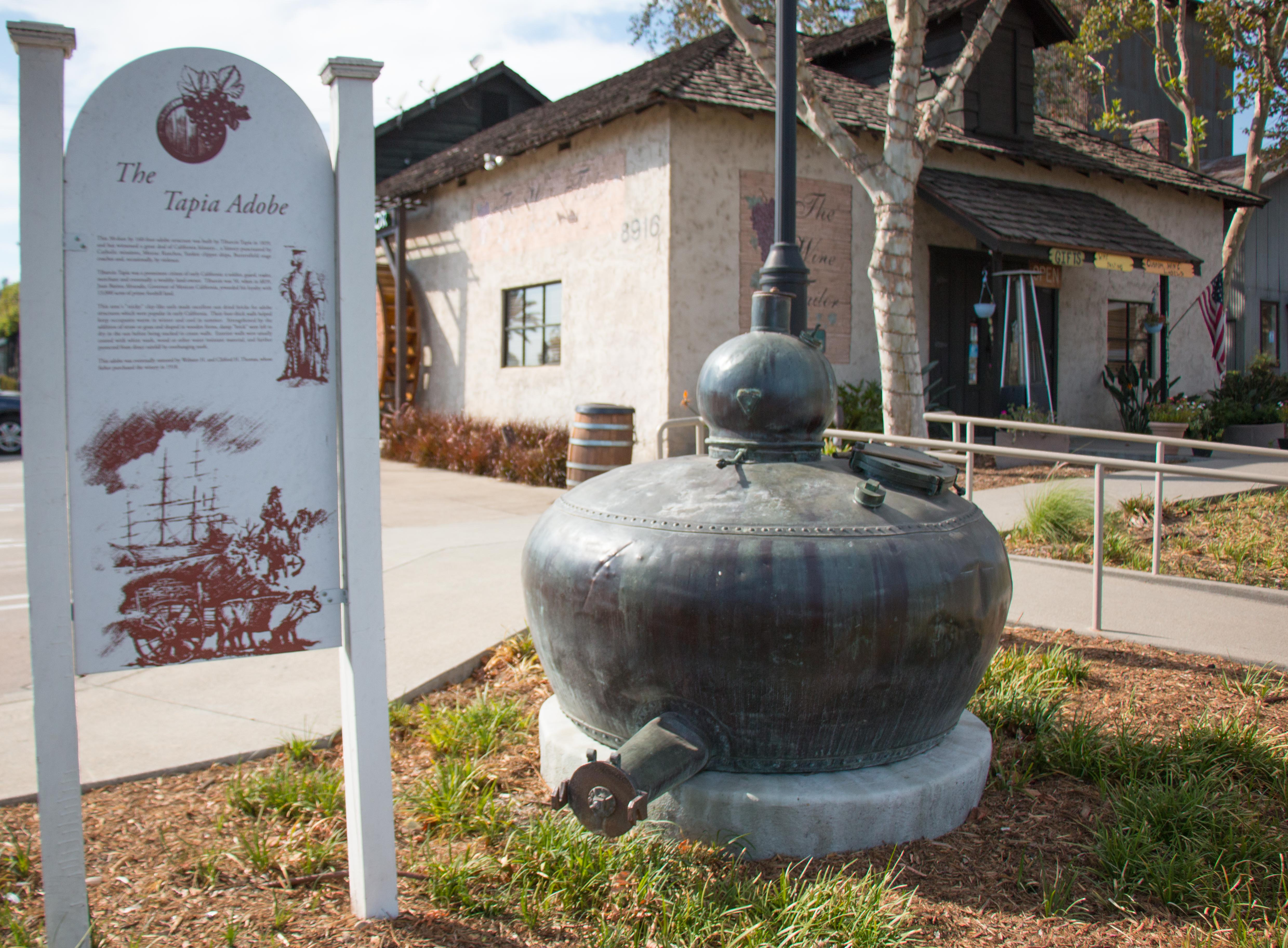
- Tapia Adobe Marker Sign

- Location within California
- 34°06′26″N 117°36′39″W
- Location: 8916 Foothill Blvd, Cucamonga, California

History
- Built: 1839

Site notes
- Area: 13,045-acre (52.79 km^{2})
- Architect: Tiburcio Tapia
- Architectural style: Adobe bricks

California Historical Landmark
- Designated: October 9, 1939.
- Reference no.: 360

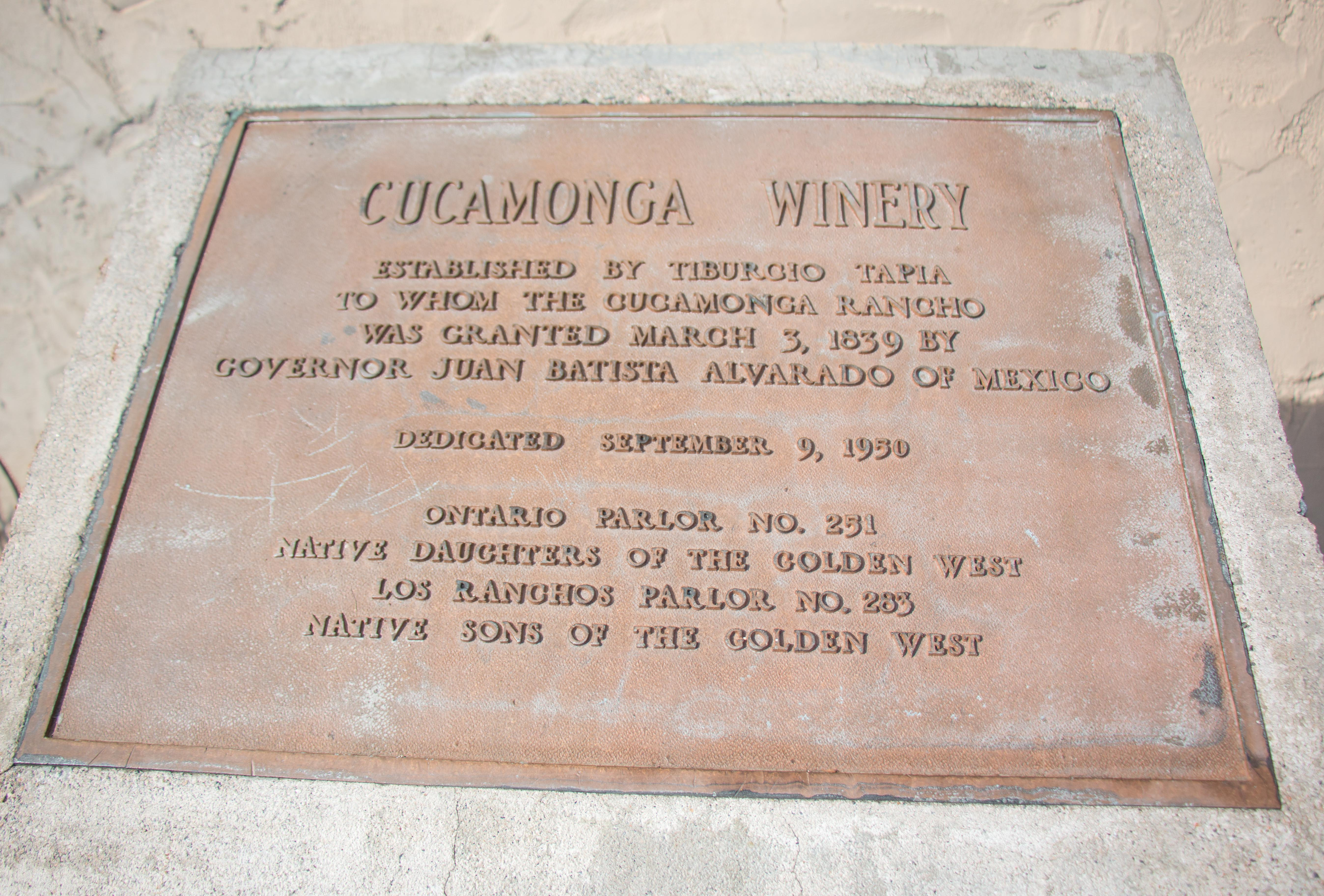
Rancho Cucamonga – Tapia Winery Historical Marker at the Cucamonga Winery, 8916 Foothill Blvd, Cucamonga, California

Tapia Adobe was the home of Tiburcio Tapia (1789–1845). Tiburcio Tapia was a Mexican soldier, politician, then became a merchant, winery owner and ranch owner, in what is now Cucamonga, California. The place of Tapia Adobe (home) was designated a California Historic Landmark (No.360) on October 9, 1939. Tiburcio Tapía received the land to build his Adobe and Rancho Cucamonga from a 1839 13,045-acre (52.79 km^{2}) Mexican land grant in present-day San Bernardino County, California The land grant was from Mexican governor Juan Bautista Alvarado. The grant formed parts of present-day Rancho Cucamonga and Upland. It extended easterly from San Antonio Creek to what is now Hermosa Avenue, and from today's Eighth Street to the mountains.

== Rancho Cucamonga ==
Tiburcio Tapía started a winery the first in California and the second oldest in the United States. Tapía heirs sold Rancho de Cucamonga in 1858, and the large Adobe home was abandoned. The original home was built with sun-dried adobe bricks. Without a good roof adobe structures can be damaged quickly. With a good roof adobe structures still need constant maintenance. Tapia Adobe return to the earth. John Rains purchased Rancho Cucamonga. John Rains with his wife built in 1860, a new home and called it Casa de Rancho Cucamonga. Casa de Rancho Cucamonga was restored and is now a National Register of Historic Places.Isaias W. Hellman, a Los Angeles banker, and a San Francisco business syndicate acquired the 13,045 acres (52.79 km^{2}) Rancho Cucamonga at a sheriff's sale in 1871. Hellman and his partners, which included former Governor John Downey, subdivided the land. Hellman continued to make port and sweet Angelica wine from Cucamonga's fabled vineyard. Tapia had first planted grapes in 1839 and Rains had increased the vineyard to 150 acres (0.61 km^{2}) in 1859. Train service started in the area in 1887. Later the land was subdivided into the towns of Cucamonga, Etiwanda, and Alta Loma. The city of Rancho Cucamonga incorporate in 1977 from the three towns. The northern part of Chaffey's Ontario colony became the city of Upland, incorporated in 1906.

== Tapia family ==
- Felipe Santiago Tapia (1745–1811), soldier in the de Anza Expedition. Tapia Drive in San Francisco's Parkmerced is named for him. The nearby Cardenas Avenue is named for his wife.
- Jose Bartolome Tapia (1766–1824), son of Felipe Santiago Tapia, eldest of nine children, grantee of Rancho Topanga Malibu Sequit.
- Tiburcio Tapia (1789–1845), son of Jose Bartolome Tapia, grantee of Rancho Cucamonga, Mayor of Los Angeles 1830, 1839 and 1840. Married María Tomasa Valdéz.
- Maria Merced Tapia de Prudhomme, daughter of Tiburcio Tapia, married Leon Victor Prudhomme.

== Markers ==
Marker at the Tapia Adobe reads:

- In 1839 Governor Juan Alvarado granted the 13,000-acre tract called Cucamonga to Tiburcio Tapia, an ex-soldier who was a prominent merchant and alcalde in Los Angeles. A half-mile west of this marker Tapia, employing Indian laborers, immediately built an adobe house on a vantage point on Red Hill. The large adobe was abandoned in 1858 when Tapia's heirs sold the rancho. The adobe soon disintegrated into its native earth. This marker is located on land which once was a part of Tapia's rancho.

Marker at Cucamonga Winery site reads:

- Established by Tiburcio Tapia, to whom the Cucamonga Rancho was granted March 3, 1839, by Governor Juan Bautista Alvarado of Mexico.

== See also ==
- California Historical Landmarks in San Bernardino County, California
- History of San Bernardino, California
- Timeline of San Bernardino, California history
- San Bernardino de Sena Estancia
- Ranchos of Los Angeles County, California
- List of Ranchos of California
- Ranchos of California
