= Steve PonTell =

- Born: 1961 (age 64–65); Loma Linda, California, United States
- Occupations: Business executive and policy expert
- Known for: President, CEO National Community Renaissance advocating housing affordability, community transformation
- Spouse: Victoria PonTell
- Children: 3 (one son, two daughters)

Steve PonTell (born 1961) is an American entrepreneur, business executive and policy expert based in Southern California. He is Chief Executive Officer of Silver Creek Modular (SCM), partner at Webb Investments, and founder of the La Jolla Institute and a leading voice on community development, housing affordability and neighborhood transformation.

PonTell's works have been frequently published in newspapers throughout Southern California. He has led regional, state and national symposiums on the issue of housing affordability and has testified before Congress and the California Assembly on ways to address the housing shortage.

== Early life and education ==
PonTell was born in 1961 in Loma Linda, California, and grew up in Big Bear Lake, California. He received his bachelor's degree in city and regional planning from California Polytechnic State University-San Luis Obispo and a Master of Business Administration from the Drucker School of Management at Claremont Graduate University.

== Career ==
PonTell has helped lead a variety of entrepreneurial ventures and held several public-private leadership positions over the years. He was co-founder for @Work Consulting Group, served as California director for the Center for the New West and served as CEO of the Inland Empire Economic Council, the Ontario Chamber of Commerce and the Big Bear Chamber of Commerce. In 1996, PonTell founded the La Jolla Institute, a California-based non-profit, nonpartisan institution for policy research, education, and economic development.

In 2012, he was named president and CEO of National CORE, a U.S. non-profit community builder specializing in affordable, multifamily, mixed-income, senior, workforce and special needs housing. Based in Rancho Cucamonga, California, National CORE operates in four states: California, Florida, Texas and Arkansas. The company is one of the largest national nonprofit developers of affordable housing in the United States, with nearly 9,000 units.

PonTell serves on a number of notable boards of directors, including the San Diego Economic Development Council and the Southern California Leadership Council. He has also previously served on The California Endowment, and is a member of the Urban Land Institute and the American Planning Association.

== Advocacy ==
PonTell has been a leading voice in the area of housing affordability and community transformation. In addition to leading regional and national symposiums on behalf of National CORE, PonTell has presented to the National Housing Conference, the University of California, Riverside School for Public Policy, the California Assembly and numerous other groups. In 2016, he served as moderator for the Southern California Association of Governments' housing and economic summits.
