= Summit Intermediate =

Coordinates: 34.1449°N 117.5146°W

- 5959 East Avenue, Rancho Cucamonga, California, 91739

Information
- Type: Public secondary
- Motto: P.R.I.D.E
- Established: 1994 (Originally 1964)
- Principal: Nicole Kelly
- Enrollment: 1,116
- Colors: Teal, Black, White
- Mascot: Sharky the Shark
- Website: Summit Sharks

Summit Intermediate is a public school in Rancho Cucamonga, California. It is one of the sixteen schools of the Etiwanda School District.

== History ==
Summit Intermediate is one of the oldest schools in the district. Summit Intermediate is one of the four middle schools in the Etiwanda School District and is located in the incorporated community of Rancho Cucamonga. Summit opened as a middle school in 1994. Before it was a middle school, it was an elementary school since 1964. Summit's feeder schools are primarily Etiwanda Colony and D.W Long. In 2013, Summit Intermediate was recognized as a "2013 California Schools To Watch" school for San Bernardino County.
