= Central School District =

Central School District may refer to:

- Central school district, a type of school district in New York
- Central School District (California)
- Central School District 51, Illinois
- Central School District 104, Illinois
- Central School District (Oregon)

== See also ==
- Central Community School System (Louisiana)
- Central Community School District, now known as Central DeWitt Community School District (Iowa)
