= National Community Renaissance =

National Community Renaissance (National CORE)
- Company type: Nonprofit
- Industry: Affordable, senior housing
- Founded: 1992
- Headquarters: Rancho Cucamonga, California, United States
- Total assets: $1.3 Billion
- Owner: Chairman Jeffrey S. Burum, CEO Steve PonTell
- Number of employees: 450

National Community Renaissance, also known as National CORE, is a U.S. nonprofit community builder specializing in affordable, multifamily, mixed-income, senior, workforce and special needs housing. Based in Rancho Cucamonga, California, National CORE operates in three states: California, Florida, and Texas. The company is one of the largest national nonprofit developers of affordable housing in the United States, with more than 10,000 apartment homes at over 110 properties. National CORE develops, owns and manages apartment homes. Its Hope through Housing Foundation – also a nonprofit organization – provides resident services such as preschool and after-school programs, senior wellness, violence prevention, economic advancement and financial literacy.

National CORE consistently ranks among the 40 largest affordable housing owners – for-profit or nonprofit – in the United States. National CORE has a staff of approximately 750 employees and serves about 30,000 family and senior residents.

== History ==
National CORE traces its roots to 1992, when homebuilders Jeffrey Burum and Andrew B. Wright founded the nonprofit Southern California Housing to provide affordable housing for an underserved population. Seven years later, National Housing was founded to expand the organization's reach. In 2006, the two units were merge to create a single nonprofit, National Community Renaissance.

The company has been a pioneer in the development of nonprofit housing in the United States. In 1996, the organization's Heritage Pointe community in Rancho Cucamonga became the first affordable housing development in the U.S. built completely in-house by a nonprofit.

National CORE plays a major role in several of the more notable community development projects in Southern California. The company serves as master developer of the Arrowhead Grove Neighborhood Revitalization effort on the site of the former Waterman Gardens public housing project in San Bernardino. The multimillion-dollar redevelopment plan calls for more than 400 housing units and is being credited with transforming one of the city's most challenged neighborhoods.

== Hope through Housing Foundation ==
In 1998, the organization created the Hope through Housing Foundation as a separate 501(c)(3) to provide services and raise funds to support programs for residents and communities. Hope through Housing also is based in Rancho Cucamonga, California. Alyssa Cotter serves as its Executive Director.

== Awards ==
In 2016, National CORE received the Supportive Housing Project of the Year Award from the Southern California Association of Nonprofit Housing for its Marv's Place community in Pasadena, California. Marv's Place houses formerly homeless individuals and families.

In 2015, its Dumosa Senior Village community in Yucca Valley, California, received the Best 50-plus Senior Independent Living Community award from the National Association of Home Builders (NAB). Other awards received by National CORE by NAB include the Best Workforce Housing Community (2013) for the Alta Vista Apartments in East Los Angeles, Best Creative Financing of an Affordable Apartment (2012 and 2010) for Encanto Court in South Central Los Angeles and San Marino Senior Apartments in San Marino, California and Best Green Building Concepts (2011) for Vista Dunes Courtyard Homes in La Quinta, California.

National CORE also has been honored by the National Association of Housing and Redevelopment Officials, the National League of Cities, the Urban Land Institute and Multi-Housing News.

In 2016, Marv's Place, Vista Dunes and the first phase of Arrowhead Grove (Valencia Vista) received Platinum LEED certification from the U.S. Green Building Council.
