= John Rains House =

Historic house in California, United States

- John Rains House; Casa de Rancho Cucamonga
- U.S. National Register of Historic Places
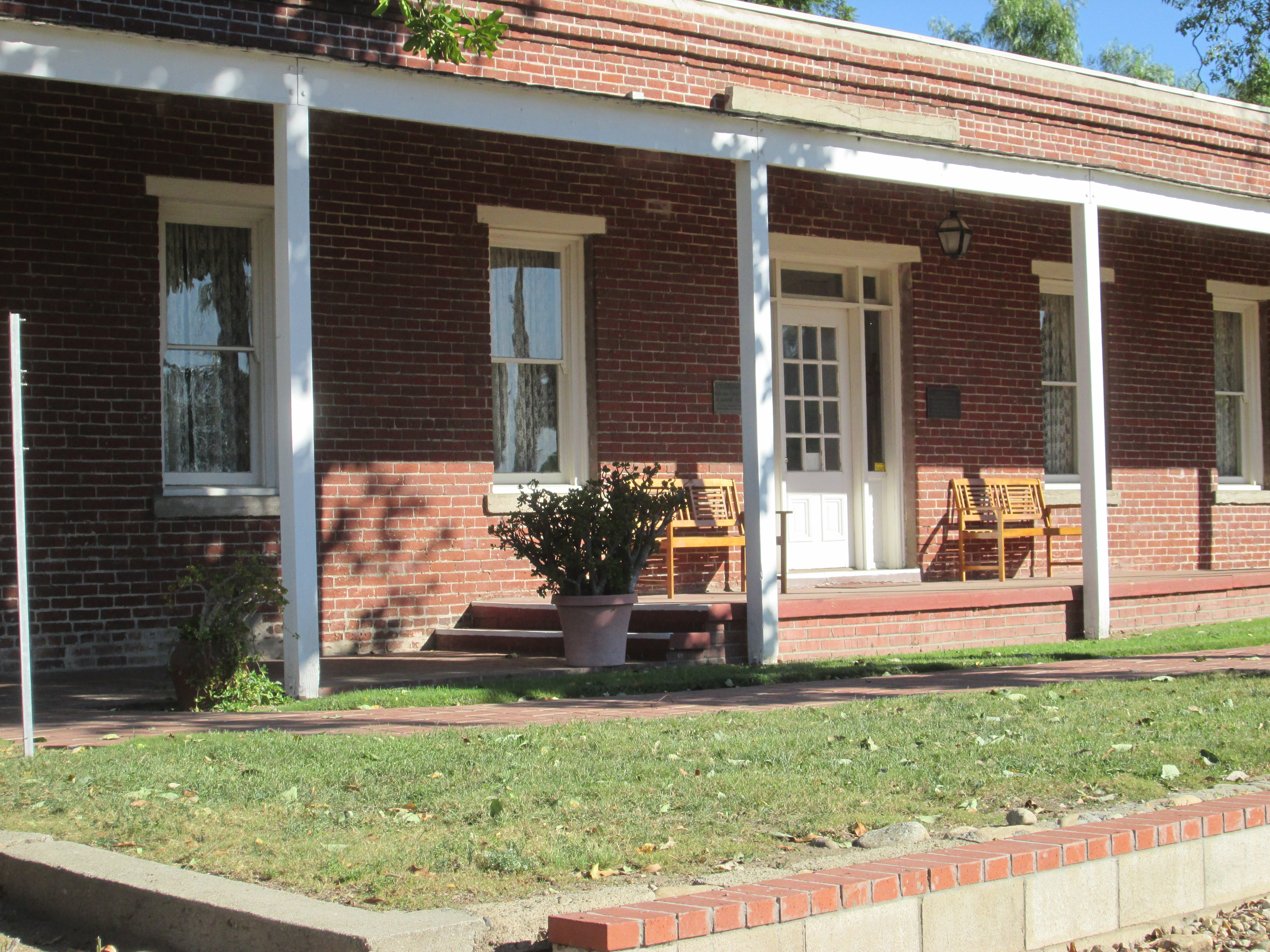

- Location within the Los Angeles metropolitan area Location within California Location within the United States
- Location: 8810 Hemlock St., Rancho Cucamonga, California
- Coordinates: 34°6′40″N 117°36′36″W
- Area: 1 acre (0.40 ha)
- Built: 1861
- NRHP reference No.: 73000428
- Added to NRHP: April 24, 1973

The Casa de Rancho Cucamonga, commonly known as the John Rains House, is a historic house located at 8810 Hemlock St. in Rancho Cucamonga, California. The house was built in 1860–1861 after John Rains purchased the Rancho Cucamonga land grant in 1858 from the Tapia estate. The brick house featured its own cooling system, which used ducts to send creek water under the house. John Rains was a prominent businessman and socialite who opened California's first commercial winery, and his house hosted lavish parties for other local elites. Rains' fortunes soon took a turn for the worse, though; he had to mortgage the house after several business failings, and in 1862 he was murdered. Maria Merced Williams, Rains' wife, who had originally inherited the property from her father, attempted to regain ownership after Rains' death but the rancho was gradually parceled out until she lost the entire property in the 1870s due in part to Rains arranging through his personal attorney to have only his name listed on the deed to all the properties. Through this lawyer the properties were signed over to his brother-in-law who gained his property from marrying Merced William's sister who had received it as the other half of the inheritance.

The house was added to the National Register of Historic Places on April 24, 1973. It is currently open to the public as a historic house museum and is a branch site of the San Bernardino County Museum. To better recognize the importance of María Merced Williams to the site's history, the San Bernardino County Board of Supervisors voted on June 28, 2022 to change the name of the site to the María Merced Williams and John Rains House.
