= Rancho Cucamonga =

Mexican land grant given in 1839

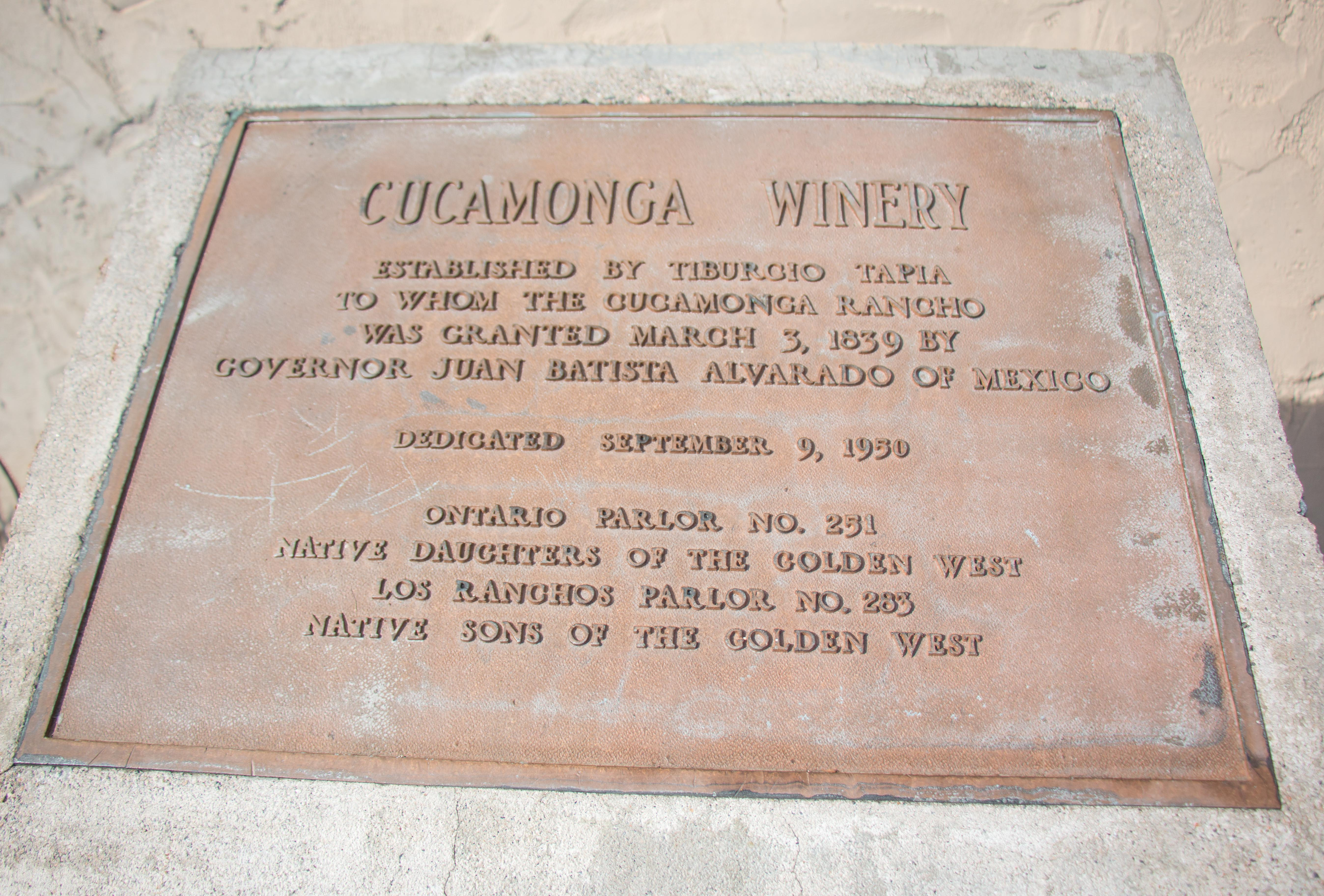
- Rancho Cucamonga Marker at the Cucamonga Winery

- Location within California
- 34°06′24″N 117°36′39″W
- Location: Rancho Cucamonga, California

History
- Built: 1839

Site notes
- Area: 13,045 acres (52.79 km^{2})

California Historical Landmark
- Designated: October 10, 1951
- Reference no.: 490

Rancho Cucamonga was a 13,045-acre (20.383 sq mi; 52.79 km^{2}) Mexican land grant in present-day San Bernardino County, California, given in 1839 to the dedicated soldier, smuggler and politician Tiburcio Tapia by Mexican governor Juan Bautista Alvarado. The grant formed parts of present-day California cities Rancho Cucamonga and Upland. It extended easterly from San Antonio Creek to what is now Hermosa Avenue, and from today's Eighth Street to the mountains.

== History ==
The Mission San Gabriel established the Rancho Cucamonga as a site for grazing their cattle. In 1839, the rancho was granted by the Mexican governor of California to Tiburcio Tapia, a wealthy Los Angeles merchant. Tapia transferred his cattle to Cucamonga and built a fort-like adobe house on Red Hill. The Rancho was inherited by Tapia's daughter, Maria Merced Tapia de Prudhomme, and her husband Leon Victor Prudhomme.

With the cession of California to the United States following the Mexican–American War, the 1848 Treaty of Guadalupe Hidalgo provided that the land grants would be honored. As required by the Land Act of 1851, a claim for Rancho Cucamonga was filed with the Public Land Commission in 1852, and the grant was patented to Leon V. Prudhomme in 1872.

Rancho Cucamonga was sold in 1858 to John Rains. Rains in 1856 married Maria Merced Williams, the daughter of Rancho Santa Ana del Chino owner Isaac Williams and granddaughter of Antonio Maria Lugo, owner of Rancho San Bernardino. Maria was thus a wealthy heiress, and Rains invested in three ranchos and the Bella Union Hotel in Los Angeles. John Rains was murdered on November 17, 1862. Three men including Tomas Procopio Bustamante were accused but only Manuel Ceredel was caught. Ceredel claimed he, Precopio and four others were paid $500 by Ramon Carrillo, another ranchero and political opponent, to kill Rains. Ceradel was convicted of attempting to murder the sheriff's deputy who arrested him and was sentenced to 10 years in San Quentin. As the sheriff took Ceredel on a boat to San Francisco, a group of vigilantes lynched Ceredel. Carrillo was examined in court twice and was released, no evidence having been found against him. Ramon Carrillo always maintained his innocence of the crime, but he was shot in the back from ambush and killed on the Los Angeles road west of Cucamonga on May 21, 1864, in another unsolved murder.

Maria Merced married José Carrillo in 1864. She had nine children in all: five with Rains, and four with Carrillo. Isaias W. Hellman, a Los Angeles banker, and a San Francisco business syndicate acquired the 13,045 acres (52.79 km^{2}) Rancho Cucamonga at a sheriff's sale in 1871. Hellman and his partners, which included former Governor John Downey, subdivided the land. Hellman continued to make port and sweet Angelica wine from Cucamonga's fabled vineyard. Tapia had first planted grapes in 1839 and Rains had increased the vineyard to 150 acres (0.61 km^{2}) in 1859.

In 1882, George Chaffey, a Canadian from the province of Ontario, purchased 8,000 acres (32 km^{2}) of the Rancho Cucamonga land for $90,000. Chaffey established an irrigation colony which he named Ontario, after his homeland of Ontario, Canada. The Ontario colony later became the city of Ontario, incorporated in 1891. The northern part of Chaffey's Ontario colony became the city of Upland, incorporated in 1906.

In 1977 three unincorporated communities which had emerged on the old ranch lands—Alta Loma, Cucamonga and Etiwanda—became the city of Rancho Cucamonga.

== Historic sites ==
- Chinatown House
- John Rains House (National Register of Historic Places #73-428)
- Tapia Adobe (California Historical Landmark #360)
- Rancho Cucamonga Marker is at the Cucamonga Winery (California Historical Landmark #490)

== Markers ==
Marker at Cucamonga Winery site reads:

Established by Tiburcio Tapia, to whom the Cucamonga Rancho was granted March 3, 1839, by Governor Juan Bautista Alvarado of Mexico.

== See also ==
- California Historical Landmarks in San Bernardino County, California
- History of San Bernardino, California
- Timeline of San Bernardino, California history
- San Bernardino de Sena Estancia
- Ranchos of Los Angeles County, California
- List of Ranchos of California
- Ranchos of California
