= Amphastar Pharmaceuticals =

American pharmaceutical company

Amphastar Pharmaceuticals, Inc.
- Company type: Public
- Traded as: Nasdaq: AMPH; S&P 600 component
- Headquarters: Rancho Cucamonga, California, United States
- Key people: Mary Z. Luo; (Chairman of the Board); Jack Yongfeng Zhang; (CEO)
- Revenue: ▲US$ 644.4 million (2023)
- Operating income: ▲US$ 196.9 million (2023)
- Net income: ▲US$ 137.5 million (2023)
- Total assets: ▲US$ 741.9 million (2022)
- Total equity: ▲US$ 528.6 million (2022)
- Number of employees: 1,615
- Website: Amphastar.com

Amphastar Pharmaceuticals is a publicly traded American speciality pharmaceutical company. It was incorporated in May 2004 and primarily develops, manufactures, and sells inhalation and intranasal products.

One of its products is naloxone, an injectable generic drug that treats opioid overdose, and the company was criticized when it doubled the price of the drug from around $20 to $40 in 2015 during the opioid epidemic. In February 2017, the FDA rejected the company's application to market a device that delivers naloxone intranasally.

In March 2018, the company won a patent infringement lawsuit brought against it by Momenta Pharmaceuticals and Sandoz Inc in an ongoing antitrust case.

In April 2023, Amphastar Pharmaceuticals bought Baqsimi from Eli Lilly in a deal worth over $1bn.

== See also ==
- List of S&P 600 companies
