= Central School District (California) =

School district in California, United States

Address
- 8316 Red Oak Street Rancho Cucamonga, California, 91730; United States

District information
- Type: Public
- Grades: K–8
- NCES District ID: 0607950

Students and staff
- Students: 4,219
- Teachers: 189.45 (FTE)
- Staff: 238.76
- Student–teacher ratio: 22.27

Other information
- Website: www.centralsd.net

Central School District is a K-8 school district in San Bernardino County, California that covers a portion of Rancho Cucamonga. The district currently serves approximately 5,200 students. The district feeds into Chaffey Joint Union High School District.

== Schools ==
=== Elementary schools ===
- Bear Gulch Elementary School
- Central Elementary School
- Coyote Canyon Elementary School
- Doña Merced Elementary School
- Valle Vista Elementary School

=== Middle schools ===
- Cucamonga Middle School
- Ruth Musser Middle School - Ruth Musser is located in Rancho Cucamonga, CA. Its grade levels go through 5th- 8th. Ruth Musser is a public school and was originally named after a woman, Ruth Musser, that was involved with the Central School District. The school colors are teal, white, black, gray and their mascot is a bulldog. Ruth Musser's current principal is Mr. Pierce.
