= Cucamonga Winery =

California Historic Landmark

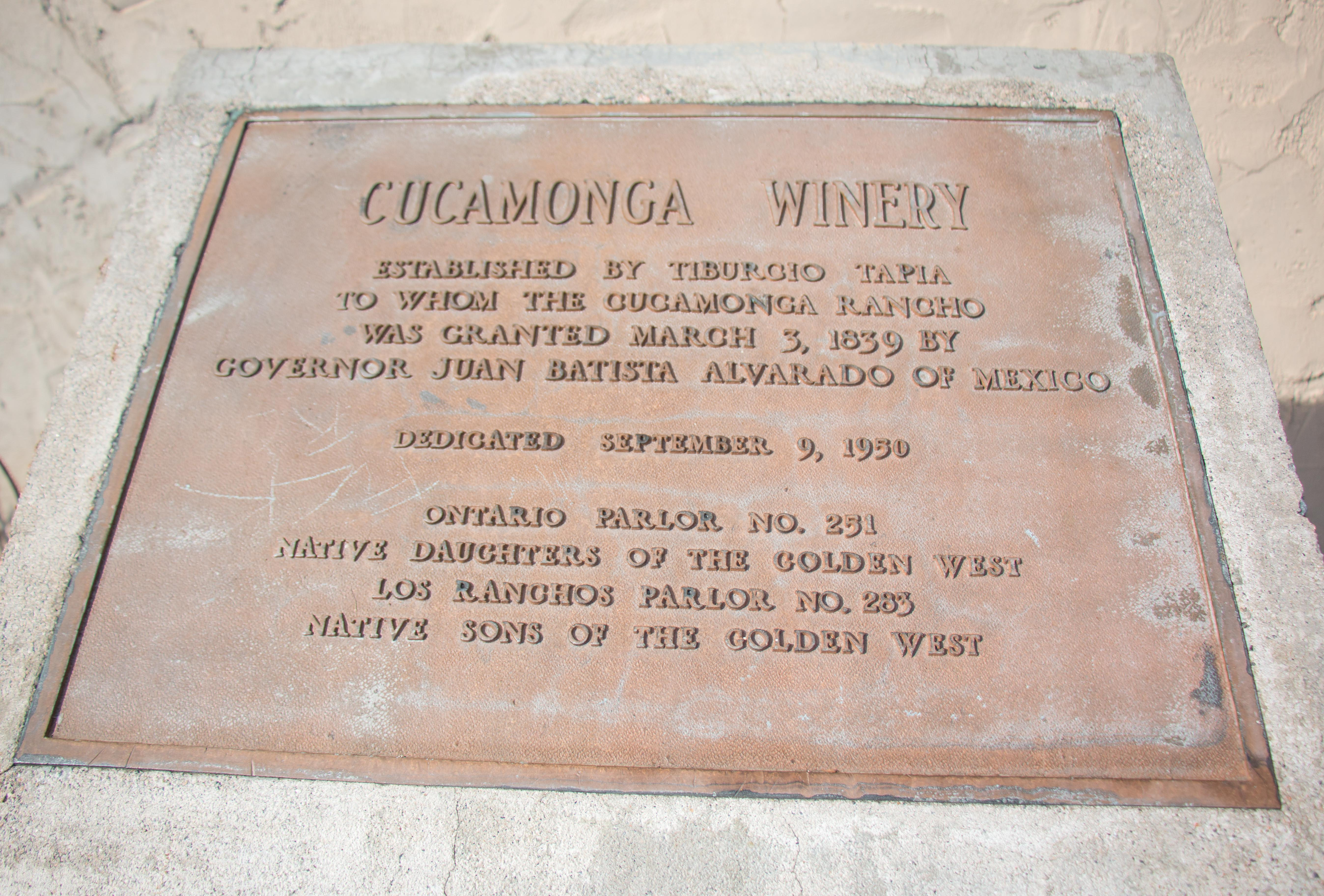
Rancho Cucamonga Historical Marker at the Cucamonga Winery, 8916 Foothill Blvd, Cucamonga, California

Cucamonga Winery is an American winery originally located in Cucamonga, California. It was started by brothers Alfred and Eduardo Accomazzo in 1933. The winery is connected with the city's founding. A California Historical Landmark marker was placed at Cucamonga Winery in Cucamonga, California, marking the spot of historical Rancho Cucamonga.

== History ==
The brothers came to the United States from San Desiderio in the Asti commune of Piedmont in northwest Italy in 1902. They first lived and worked in San Francisco and then in 1916 moved to Glendale, California where they operated a winery.

They switched to working in real estate during prohibition. After prohibition they went back to winemaking, this time in Cucamonga. In 1933 Alfred started the Cucamonga Winery. The Cucamonga area was designated Cucamonga Valley AVA American Viticultural Area for its grape and wine production. Alfred partnered with Dominic Merlo, Mary Pastrone and Louis Gotto. They purchased land and planted vineyards. Louis Gotto sold his share to Joseph Ettor in 1935. Ettor made the vine famous. Original distribution was in New York, Connecticut, Massachusetts, Vermont, Illinois and Ohio. Eduardo's son, Ed Accomazzo, joined the business in 1950. After Alfred Accomazzo died in 1960, his son Arthur took over his work.

At its peak the vineyard farmed 850 acres (3.4 km^{2}) around Cucamonga. Due to high property taxes, most of the vineyards were sold. In 1975 the Cucamonga Winery closed. Ed Accomazzo continued to run the Cucamonga winery in Upland, California.

== Marker ==
A Marker at the Cucamonga Winery site reads:

- Established by Tiburcio Tapia, to whom the Cucamonga Rancho was granted March 3, 1839, by Governor Juan Bautista Alvarado of Mexico.

== See also ==
- California Historical Landmarks in San Bernardino County, California
