= Rancho Cucamonga, California =

City in California, United States

- City
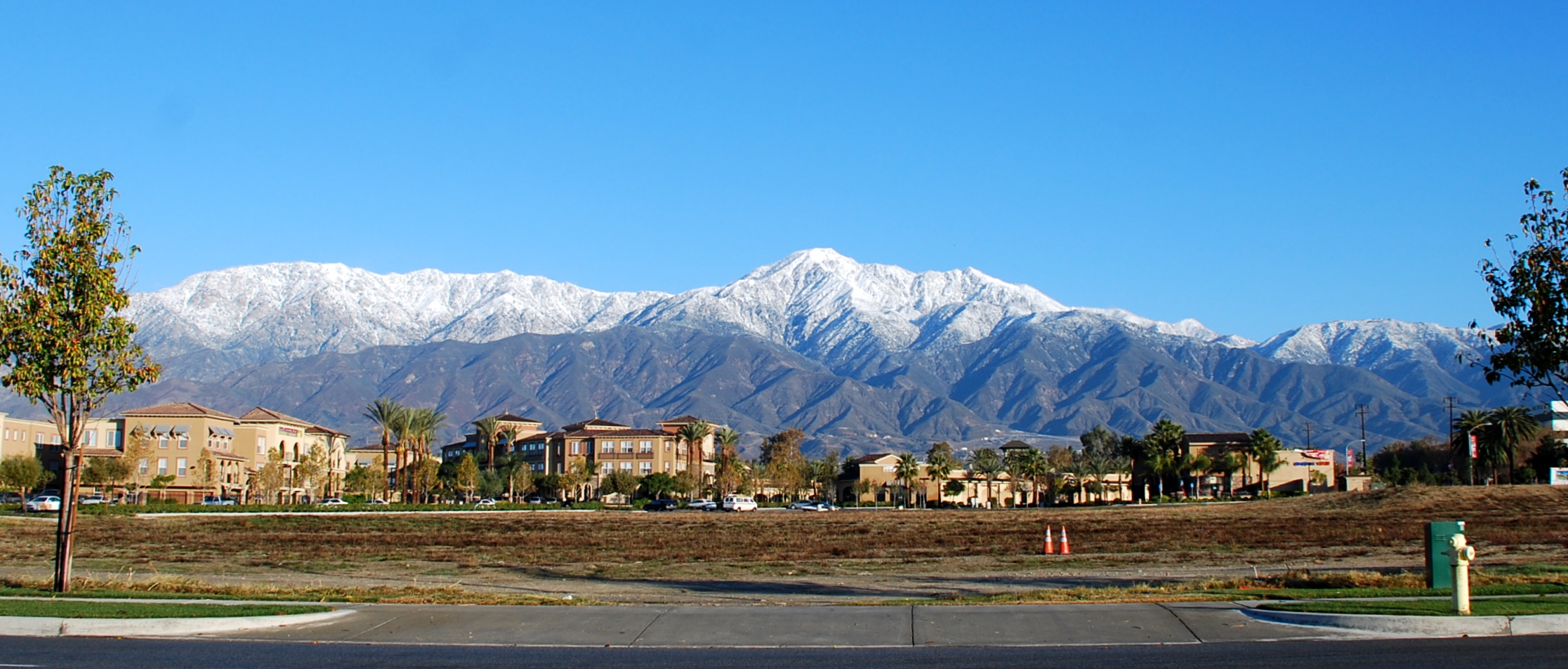
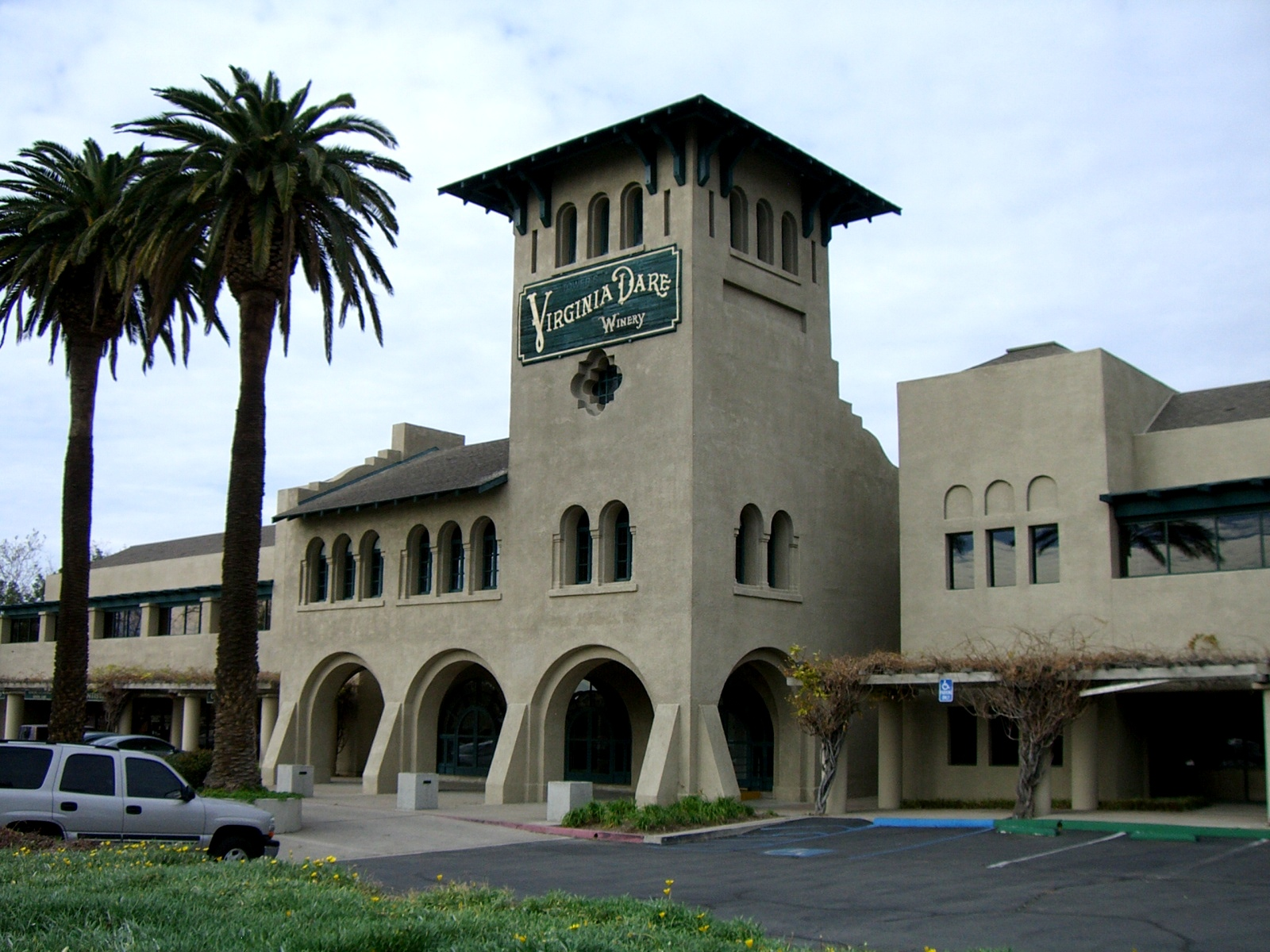
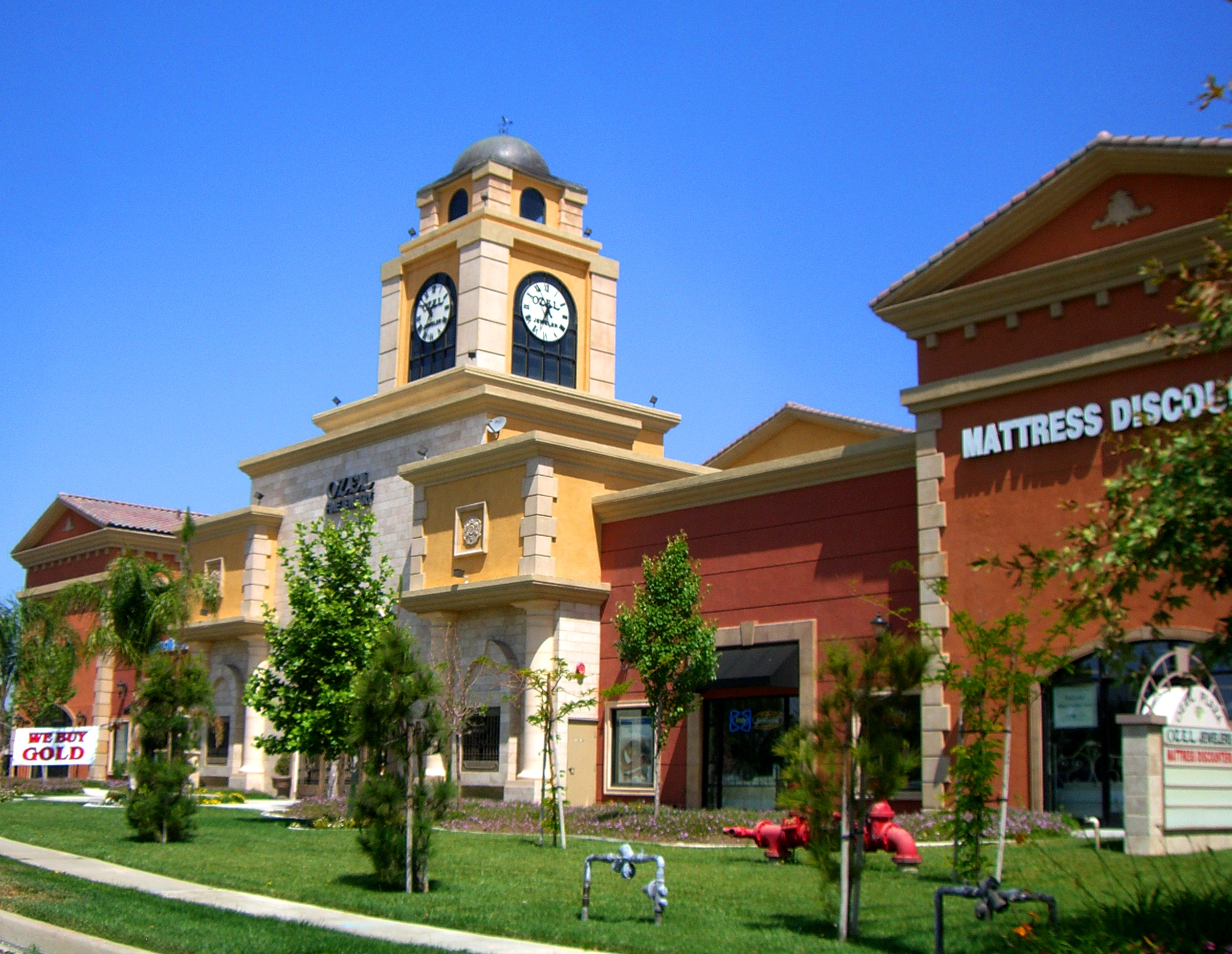
- Cucamonga Peak (top), Virginia Dare Winery (left), and shops in Rancho Cucamonga (right)

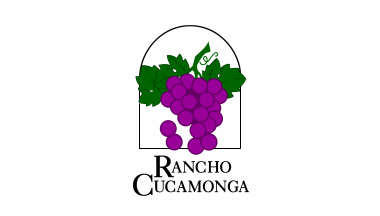
- Flag Seal
- Motto: "A World Class Community"
- Interactive map of Rancho Cucamonga, California
- Location in the United States
- Coordinates: 34°7′24″N 117°34′46″W
- Country: United States
- State: California
- County: San Bernardino
- Incorporated (city): November 30, 1977

Government
  - Type: Council-Manager
  - Mayor: L. Dennis Michael
  - Mayor pro tem: Lynne Kennedy
  - City clerk: Kim Sevy
  - City treasurer: Jim Harrington
  - City manager: John Gillison
  - City attorney: Nick Ghirelli

Area
  - Total: 40.12 sq mi (103.91 km^{2})
  - Land: 40.11 sq mi (103.88 km^{2})
  - Water: 0.012 sq mi (0.03 km^{2}) 0.02%
- Elevation: 1,207 ft (368 m)

Population (2020)
  - Total: 174,453
  - Estimate (2024): 176,675
  - Rank: 4th in San Bernardino County; 28th in California; 152nd in the United States
  - Density: 4,349.1/sq mi (1,679.21/km^{2})
- Time zone: UTC−8 (PST)
  - Summer (DST): UTC−7 (PDT)
- ZIP Code: 91701, 91729, 91730, 91737, 91739
- Area codes: 909, 840
- FIPS code: 06-59451
- GNIS feature ID: 1667908
- Website: www.cityofrc.us

Rancho Cucamonga (/ˌræntʃoʊ kuːkəˈmʌŋɡə/ RAN-choh KOO-kə-MUNG-gə) is a city located just south of the foothills of the San Gabriel Mountains and Angeles National Forest in the Inland Empire region of San Bernardino County, California, United States. About 37 mi (60 km) east of Downtown Los Angeles, Rancho Cucamonga is the 28th most populous city in California. The city's seal, which centers on a cluster of grapes, alludes to the city's agricultural history including wine-making. The city's proximity to major transportation hubs, airports, and highways has attracted the business of several large corporations, including Coca-Cola, Frito-Lay, Big Lots, Mercury Insurance Group, Southern California Edison, and Amphastar Pharmaceuticals.

The city had a population of 174,453 according to the 2020 United States census.

The Jack Benny Program popularized the city's name, in particular the word Cucamonga.

== History ==
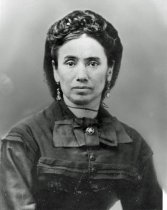
María Merced Tapia inherited Rancho Cucamonga from her father, Tiburcio Tapia, a wealthy Californio merchant. She sold it to John Rains in 1858.

By 1200 AD, Kukamongan Native Americans had established a village settlement in the area around present-day Red Hill, near the city's western border, where Red Hill Country Club stands today. Kukamonga derives its name from a Tongva word meaning "sandy place." Anthropologists have determined that this cluster of settlers likely belonged to the Tongva people or Kich people, at one time one of the largest concentrations of Native American peoples on the North American continent. In the 18th century, following an expedition led by Gaspar de Portola, the land was incorporated into the Mission System established by Father Junipero Serra and his group of soldiers and Franciscan friars.

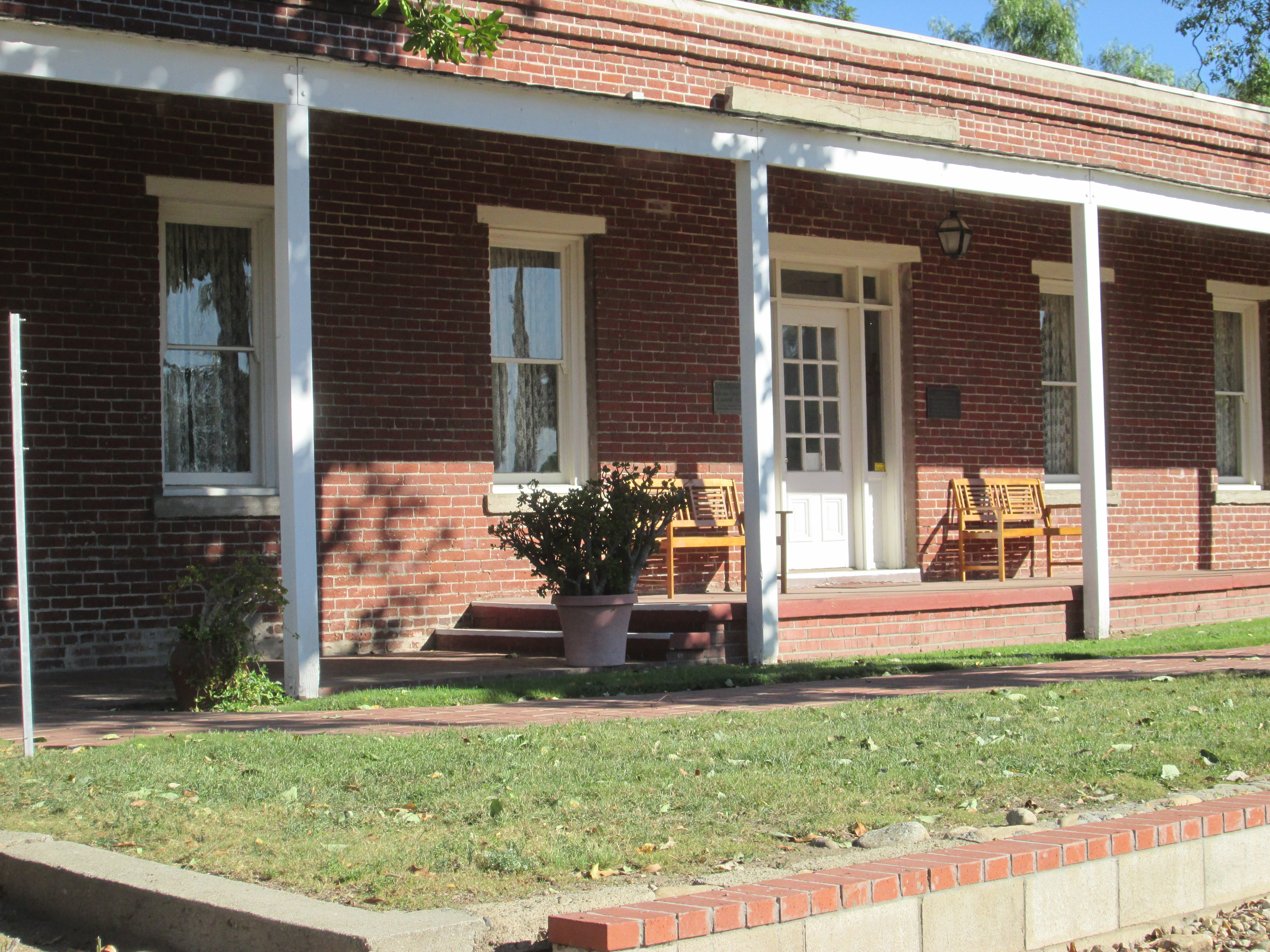
Casa de Rancho Cucamonga, a National Historic Landmark, built in 1861

After a half century of political jockeying in the region, the land finally came under the control of Juan Bautista Alvarado, governor of Mexico. On March 3, 1839, Alvarado granted 13,000 acres (5,300 ha) of land in the area called "Cucamonga" to Tubercio Tapia, a first-generation Spanish native of Los Angeles, successful merchant, and notorious smuggler. Tapia went on to establish the first winery in California on his newly deeded land. Rancho Cucamonga was purchased by John Rains and his wife in 1858. The Rains family's home, Casa de Rancho Cucamonga, was completed in 1860 and now appears on the National Register of Historic Places.

During the ensuing years the town prospered and grew. In 1887, irrigation tunnels were dug into Cucamonga Canyon by Chinese laborers and the Santa Fe Railroad was extended through the area. Among the town's economic mainstays was agriculture, including olives, peaches, citrus, and, most notably, vineyards. In 1913, the Pacific Electric Railway was extended through Rancho Cucamonga in an effort to improve crop transportation. Several landmarks in existence today pay tribute to the city's multicultural founding. In particular, Our Lady of Mt. Carmel remains as a relic of the area's Mexican agriculture laborers while the Chinatown House stands as a reminder of the Chinese immigrants who labored in constructing the area's infrastructure.

In 1977, the unincorporated communities of Alta Loma, Cucamonga, and Etiwanda voted to incorporate, forming the city of Rancho Cucamonga.

=== Grapeland ===
The former community of Grapeland, first settled in 1869, lay roughly between today's Victoria Groves Park and Central Park. There was a schoolhouse which also doubled as a church. In 1890 an irrigation district was formed and $200,000 in bonds were sold to pay for improvements. The Sierra Vista reservoir was built in 1886–87 by J.L. Scofield as the focal point of a network of irrigation pipes. The system was unused, however, because the bond issue was declared illegal. "Orchards and vineyards began to die," The Daily Report newspaper reported in a retrospective. "Residents moved out. The post office closed in 1905. Homes, buildings were destroyed or abandoned." The reservoir remained unused until 1956, when the Fontana Union Water Company filled it with 5 million US gal (19 million L) of water. The local school district was merged with the Etiwanda district in 1901. In 1957 the settlement was practically deserted, but there were still rabbit-proof stone walls marking boundaries of previous citrus orchards.

== Geography ==
Rancho Cucamonga is part of the Inland Empire and San Bernardino County, a region that lies inland from the Pacific coast and directly east of Los Angeles County. Rancho Cucamonga is located about 37 mi (60 km) east of Los Angeles, bordered by Upland to its west, Ontario to its south, the San Gabriel Mountains to its north and I-15 and Fontana to its east. Situated on an alluvial plain with a wildland–urban interface, bears occasionally wander through. Views of Cucamonga Peak, one of the tallest peaks of the San Gabriel Mountains, are available. The city has a total area of 40.1 sq mi (104 km^{2}), of which 99.98% is land and 0.02% is water.

=== Climate ===
The city's climate is classified as hot-summer Mediterranean, or Csa, under the Köppen climate classification system. Summers are long and hot, and winters are generally comfortable with occasionally chilly days. Yearly precipitation is 17.68 in (449 mm) and the city experiences an average of 287 sunny days per year, compared to a national average of 205 days.

Climate data for Rancho Cucamonga, California (1987–2016; extremes since 1909)
Month	Jan	Feb	Mar	Apr	May	Jun	Jul	Aug	Sep	Oct	Nov	Dec	Year
Record high °F (°C)	90 (32)	90 (32)	97 (36)	110 (43)	107 (42)	115 (46)	112 (44)	111 (44)	112 (44)	110 (43)	98 (37)	93 (34)	115 (46)
Mean daily maximum °F (°C)	66.2 (19.0)	68.5 (20.3)	69.3 (20.7)	74.3 (23.5)	79.0 (26.1)	86.0 (30.0)	93.9 (34.4)	93.7 (34.3)	89.4 (31.9)	82.2 (27.9)	72.3 (22.4)	66.9 (19.4)	78.4 (25.8)
Mean daily minimum °F (°C)	41.4 (5.2)	43.0 (6.1)	44.1 (6.7)	46.9 (8.3)	51.4 (10.8)	55.9 (13.3)	61.2 (16.2)	62.1 (16.7)	59.0 (15.0)	53.2 (11.8)	45.7 (7.6)	41.4 (5.2)	52.5 (11.4)
Record low °F (°C)	25 (−4)	29 (−2)	30 (−1)	33 (1)	38 (3)	43 (6)	52 (11)	51 (11)	47 (8)	40 (4)	26 (−3)	24 (−4)	24 (−4)
Average rainfall inches (mm)	4.16 (106)	5.14 (131)	2.70 (69)	1.10 (28)	0.44 (11)	0.21 (5.3)	0.07 (1.8)	0.04 (1.0)	0.25 (6.4)	0.93 (24)	1.22 (31)	1.42 (36)	17.68 (450.5)
Average rainy days (≥ 0.01 inch)	7.2	6.7	7.7	4.1	2.8	1.6	0.5	0.7	1.7	2.6	3.4	4.8	43.8

== Demographics ==
Historical population
Census	Pop.	Note	%±
1980	55,250		—
1990	101,409		83.5%
2000	127,743		26.0%
2010	165,269		29.4%
2020	174,453		5.6%

=== Racial and ethnic composition ===
Rancho Cucamonga city, California – Racial and ethnic composition Note: the US Census treats Hispanic/Latino as an ethnic category. This table excludes Latinos from the racial categories and assigns them to a separate category. Hispanics/Latinos may be of any race.
Race / ethnicity (NH = Non-Hispanic)	Pop. 2000	Pop. 2010	Pop. 2020	% 2000	% 2010	% 2020
White alone (NH)	70,028	70,572	59,931	54.82%	42.70%	34.35%
Black or African American alone (NH)	9,789	14,486	15,237	7.66%	8.77%	8.73%
Native American or Alaska Native alone (NH)	405	409	357	0.32%	0.25%	0.20%
Asian alone (NH)	7,469	16,741	25,186	5.85%	10.13%	14.44%
Native Hawaiian or Pacific Islander alone (NH)	292	383	387	0.23%	0.23%	0.22%
Other Race alone (NH)	294	400	987	0.23%	0.24%	0.57%
Mixed race or Multiracial (NH)	3,975	4,590	7,107	3.11%	2.78%	4.07%
Hispanic or Latino (any race)	35,491	57,688	65,261	27.78%	34.91%	37.41%
Total	127,743	165,269	174,453	100.00%	100.00%	100.00%

=== 2020 ===
The 2020 United States census counted 174,453 people, 58,277 households, and 44,440 families in Rancho Cucamonga. The population density was 4,349.4 per square mile (1,679.3/km^{2}). There were 60,129 housing units at an average density of 1,499.1 per square mile (578.8/km^{2}). The racial makeup was 42.6% (74,323) white or European American (34.35% non-Hispanic white), 9.22% (16,089) black or African-American, 1.12% (1,954) Native American or Alaska Native, 14.79% (25,809) Asian, 0.28% (486) Pacific Islander or Native Hawaiian, 15.09% (26,326) from other races, and 16.89% (29,466) from two or more races. Hispanic or Latino of any race was 37.41% (65,261) of the population.

Of the 58,277 households, 37.4% had children under the age of 18; 53.8% were married couples living together; 25.6% had a female householder with no spouse or partner present. 18.5% of households consisted of individuals and 7.1% had someone living alone who was 65 years of age or older. The average household size was 3.0 and the average family size was 3.5. The percent of those with a bachelor’s degree or higher was estimated to be 26.0% of the population.

22.7% of the population was under the age of 18, 9.0% from 18 to 24, 27.5% from 25 to 44, 27.0% from 45 to 64, and 13.8% who were 65 years of age or older. The median age was 38.3 years. For every 100 females, there were 105.2 males. For every 100 females ages 18 and older, there were 108.0 males.

The 2016–2020 5-year American Community Survey estimates show that the median household income was $92,290 (with a margin of error of +/- $3,367). The median family income was $103,094 (+/- $3,474). Males had a median income of $50,894 (+/- $1,437) versus $37,094 (+/- $2,655) for females. The median income for those above 16 years old was $43,129 (+/- $1,515). Approximately, 5.6% of families and 6.8% of the population were below the poverty line, including 7.9% of those under the age of 18 and 6.5% of those ages 65 or over.

German, Irish and English were the most common ancestries. Spanish was the second most common language.

=== 2010 ===
The 2010 United States census reported that Rancho Cucamonga had a population of 165,269. The population density was 4,145.2 inhabitants per square mile (1,600.5/km^{2}). The racial makeup of Rancho Cucamonga was 102,401 (62.0%) White (42.7% Non-Hispanic White), 15,246 (9.2%) African American, 1,134 (0.7%) Native American, 17,208 (10.4%) Asian, 443 (0.3%) Pacific Islander, 19,878 (12.0%) from other races, and 8,959 (5.4%) from two or more races. There were 57,688 residents of Hispanic or Latino ancestry, of any race (34.9%).

The census reported that 162,145 people (98.1% of the population) lived in households, 136 (0.1%) lived in non-institutionalized group quarters, and 2,988 (1.8%) were institutionalized.

Out of a total of 54,383 households, 23,055 (42.4%) had children under the age of 18 living in them, 30,533 (56.1%) were opposite-sex married couples living together, 7,514 (13.8%) had a female householder with no husband present, and 3,257 (6.0%) had a male householder with no wife present, as well as 2,995 (5.5%) unmarried opposite-sex partnerships and 425 (0.8%) same-sex married couples or partnerships. 9,956 households (18.3%) were made up of individuals, and 2,679 (4.9%) had someone living alone who was 65 years of age or older. The average household size was 2.98. Over the 41,304 families (76.0% of all households), the average family size was 2.90.

During 2009–2013, Rancho Cucamonga had a median household income of $77,835, with 6.9% of the population living below the federal poverty line.

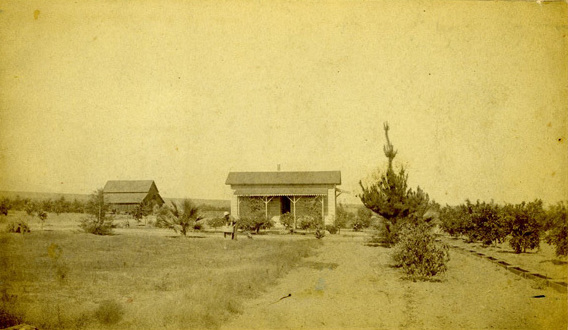
Orchards and farms, such as this Cucamonga ranch photographed in 1884, dominated the landscape of the area until the land development boom in the late 20th century.

== Economy ==
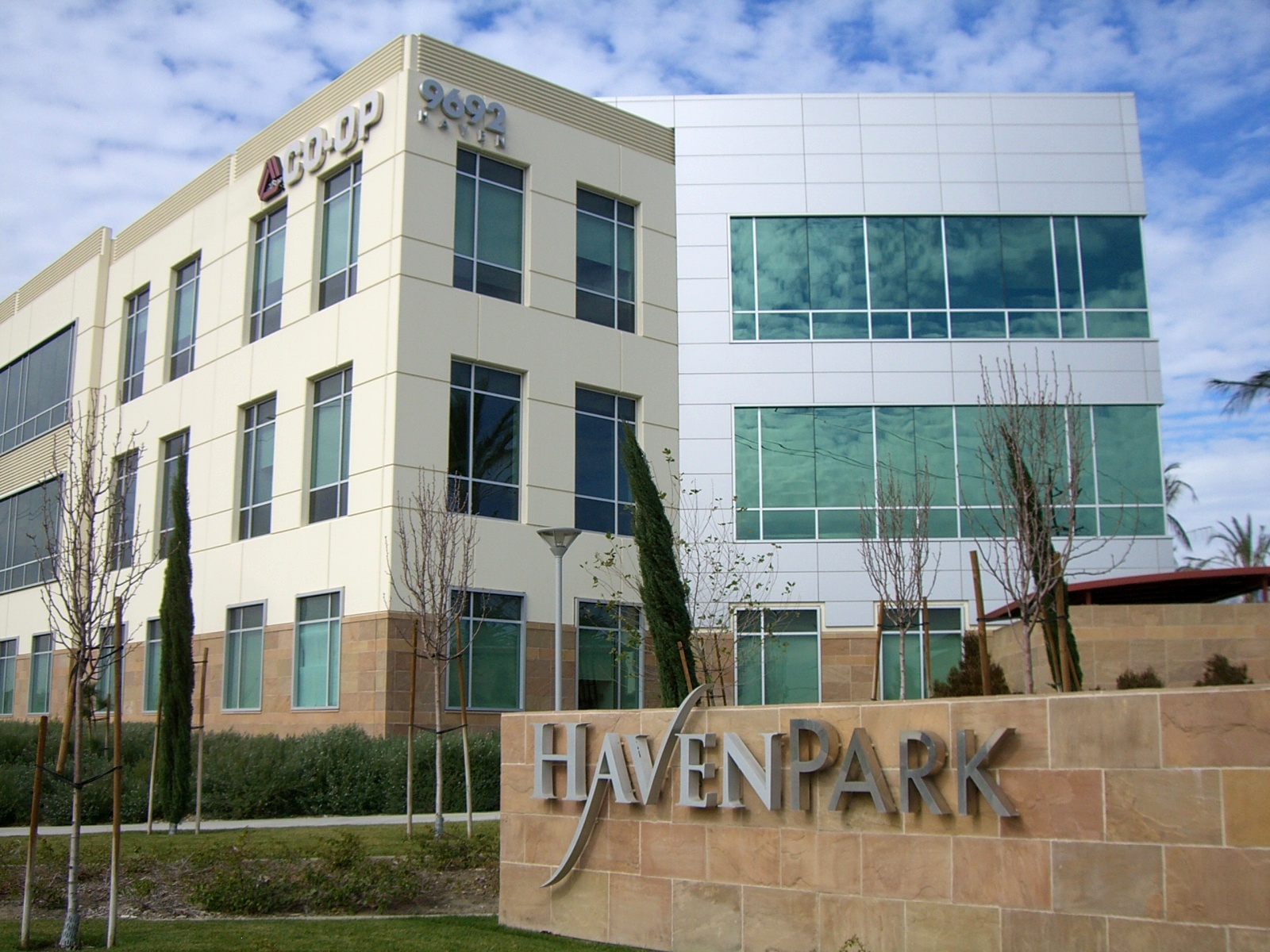
An example of the office parks along Haven Avenue

While most of the city's land area is devoted to residential areas, Rancho Cucamonga, like its neighbors Ontario and Fontana, is a major center for the logistics industry in Southern California. This is due to its proximity to two interstate highways and Ontario International Airport, and the space afforded by the large tracts of former agricultural land in the southern section of the city.

In the area around Milliken Avenue, between Archibald and Etiwanda Avenues, Foothill Boulevard, and Fourth Street, about seven square miles of land are primarily occupied by numerous massive distribution centers, and even more, smaller manufacturing companies. This area is ringed by office parks, mostly along Haven Avenue, and shopping strips, such as the Terra Vista Town Center (part of a nearly two-square-mile master-planned community in the center of the city), and malls, such as Victoria Gardens, and the Ontario Mills, across Fourth Street in Ontario.

The city is also home to a CMC Steel (formerly Gerdau, formerly TAMCO Steel) minimill, the only producer of long steel in California. This mill recycles ferrous scrap, such as junked cars and appliances, to produce rebar.

The city hosts LoanMart Field (formerly known as The Epicenter), a minor-league baseball stadium, home of the Rancho Cucamonga Quakes. The Quakes' mascot, Tremor, is a "Rallysaurus."

=== Victoria Gardens ===
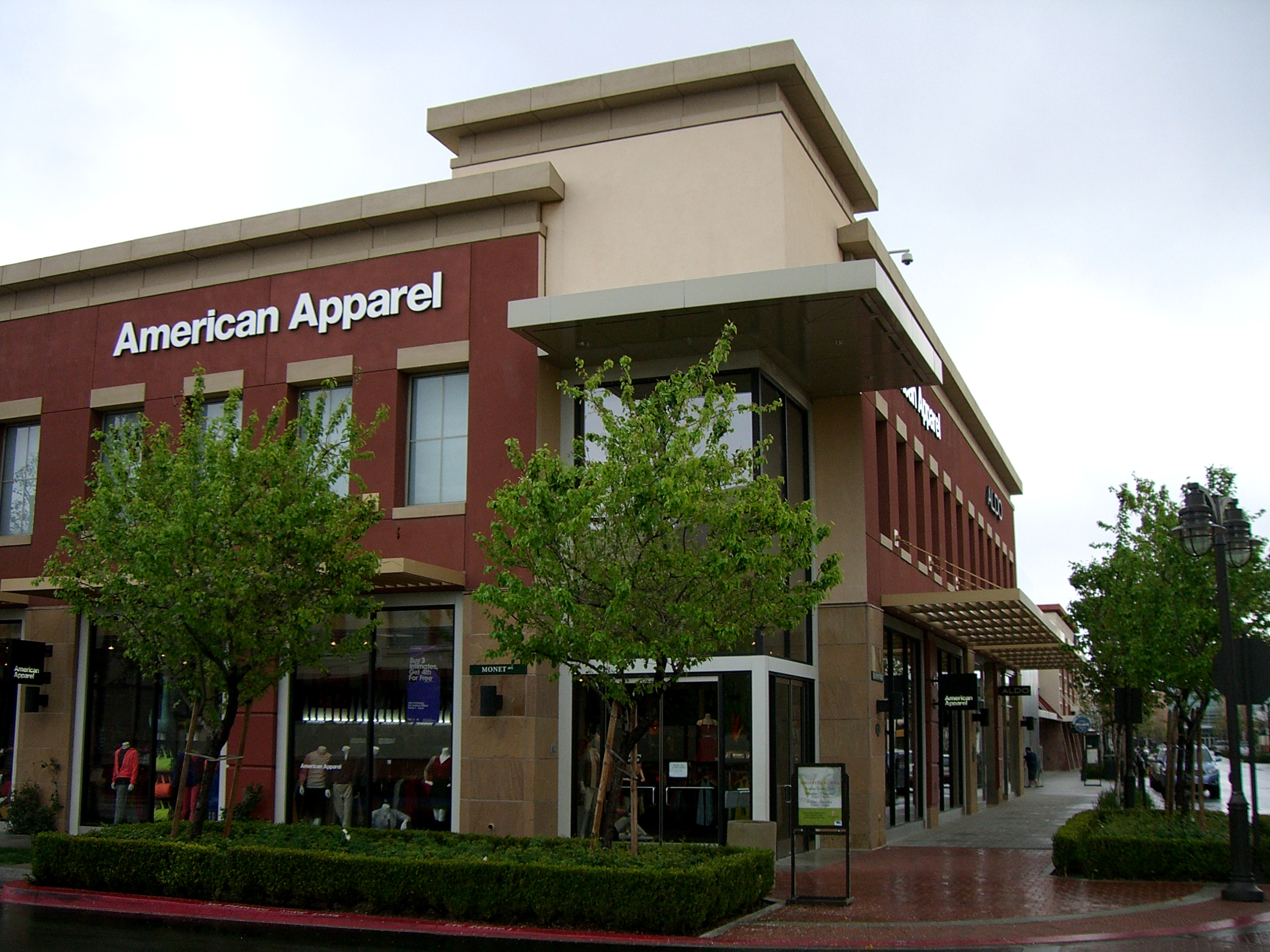
An example of the architecture and urban design of Victoria Gardens

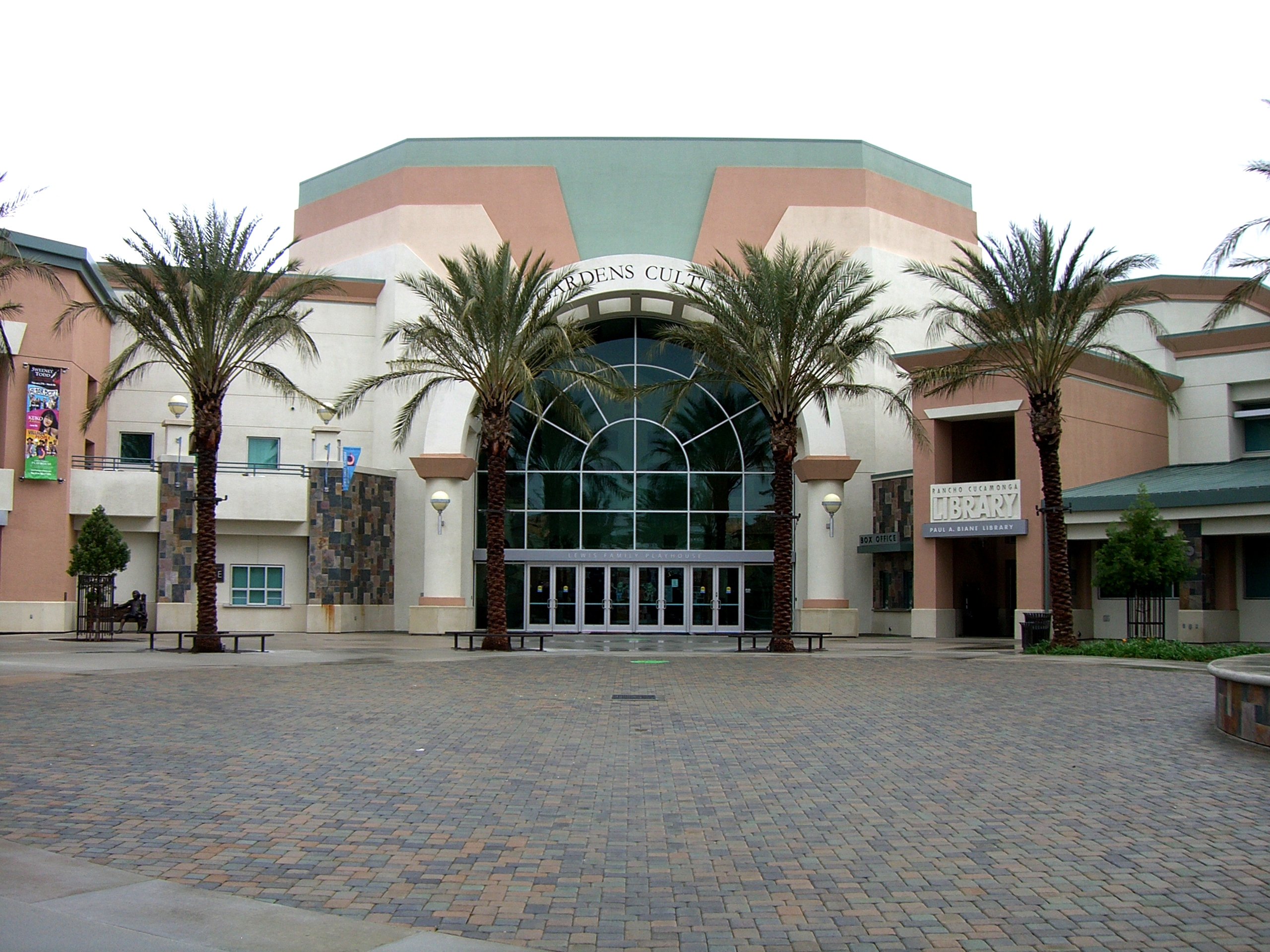
The Victoria Gardens Cultural Center

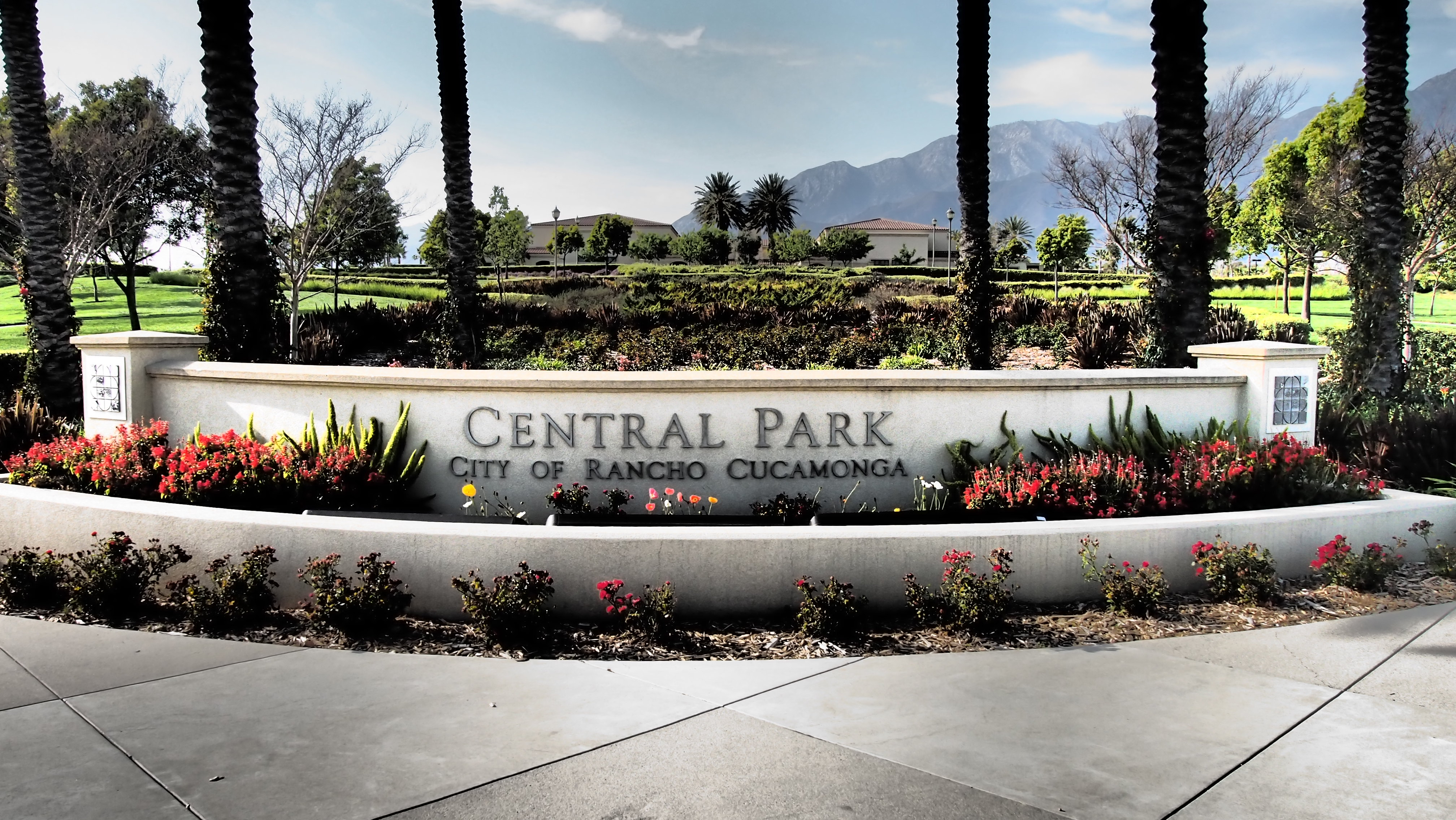
Central Park

Victoria Gardens is a lifestyle center near the eastern end of the city, at the intersection of Foothill and Day Creek Boulevards. Since the city had never developed a traditional commercial downtown like neighboring cities Ontario and Upland had, efforts were made in the design of Victoria Gardens to bring elements of more traditional and urban town design to what had historically been a suburban city. While retaining many characteristics of traditional shopping malls, such as large anchor stores, a food court, and vast parking lots and garages, the smaller stores are arranged as city blocks in a grid of two-lane streets, featuring lush landscaping and metered "teaser parking" in front of the stores, which open onto the sidewalk. There are two "Main Streets", which run from west to east across the center. Running from north to south between them is a pedestrian axis leading from one of the Macy's anchor stores, through a "town square" between a pair of mixed-use office buildings, to the Victoria Gardens Cultural Center, which contains the Lewis Playhouse (a 570-seat theater) and a branch of the city library. The east side of the development has Southern California's first Bass Pro Shops Outdoor World superstore; the 180,000-square-foot (17,000 m^{2}) facility includes a Tracker Boat Center and the Islamorada Fish Company restaurant. There are restaurants throughout the center, both well-known chains and unique eateries. The center also features a 12-screen movie theater.

=== Top employers ===
According to the city's 2023 Comprehensive Annual Financial Report, the principal employers in the city are:

Rank	Employer	# of employees	% of total employment
1	Inland Empire Health Plan	3,511	3.70%
2	Etiwanda School District	1,854	1.95%
3	Chaffey Community College	1,619	1.70%
4	Frito Lay	950	1.00%
5	Majestic Terminal Services, Inc	684	0.72%
6	City of Rancho Cucamonga	662	0.70%
7	Amphastar Pharmaceuticals	641	0.67%
8	Central School District	591	0.62%
9	National Community Renaissance of California	550	0.58%
10	Reyes Coca Cola Bottling	453	0.48%

== Government ==
=== Local government ===
Rancho Cucamonga is a General Law City, incorporated in 1977 under the "Council-Manager" form of local government. The four-member Council are elected by district. The Mayor, City Clerk, and City Treasurer, are all elected at-large by the voters of the city. The Council then appoints the City Manager, who acts as the administrative head of the city government and is responsible for the day-to-day operations, code enforcement, and the fiscal soundness of the municipal government. The council itself serves as a local legislative body. The city's elections, which are plurality, are held on a Tuesday after the first Monday in November of even-numbered years.

According to a city Comprehensive Annual Financial Report, the city's various funds had $278.3 million in revenues, $243.6 million in expenditures, $1,400.7 million in total assets, $492.1 million in total liabilities, and $583.3 million in cash and investments.

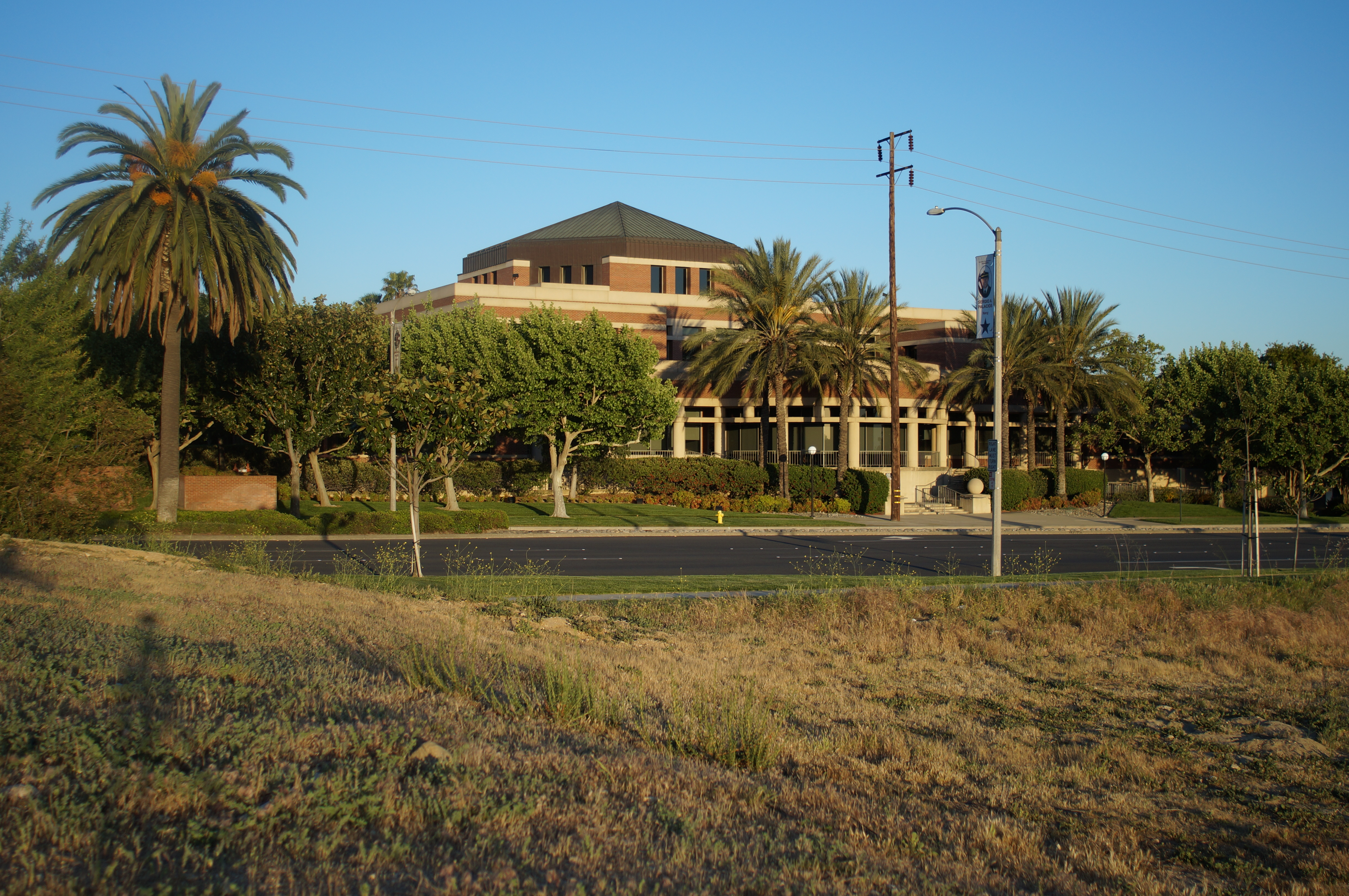
The Rancho Cucamonga Civic Center government complex west entrance, as seen from across Haven Avenue. The Civic Center complex houses government functions for the city.

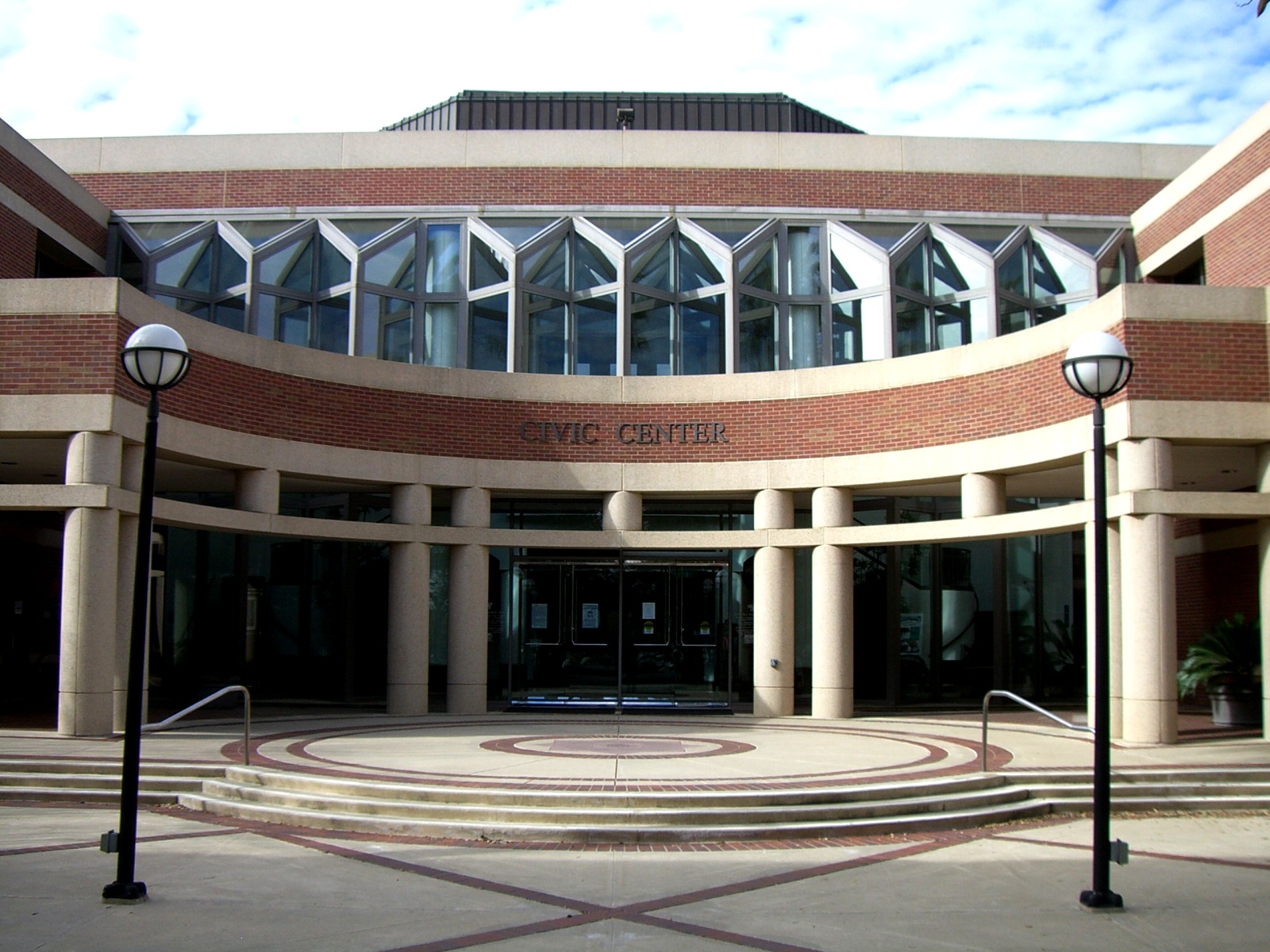
Main entrance to Rancho Cucamonga City Hall. This entrance forms the east side of the Rancho Cucamonga Civic Center, on the opposite side to the street side shown above.

=== Politics ===
In the California State Senate, Rancho Cucamonga is split between the 25th senatorial district, represented by Democrat Sasha Renée Pérez, and the 29th senatorial district, represented by Democrat Eloise Reyes.

In the California State Assembly, Rancho Cucamonga is split between the 41st Assembly district, represented by Democrat John Harabedian, and the 50th Assembly district, represented by Democrat Robert Garcia.

In the United States House of Representatives, Rancho Cucamonga is split into three districts: California's 28th congressional district, represented by Democrat Judy Chu; California's 33rd congressional district, represented by Democrat Pete Aguilar; and California's 35th congressional district, represented by Democrat Norma Torres. Rancho Cucamonga voted for Donald Trump in the 2024 presidential election over Kamala Harris.

Rancho Cucamonga vote by party in presidential elections
Year	Democratic	Republican	Third Parties
2024	46.63% 36,694	50.43% 39,683	2.94% 2,311
2020	51.85% 45,190	46.15% 40,220	2.00% 1,744
2016	49.21% 33,428	45.22% 30,715	5.57% 3,780
2012	48.35% 30,667	49.65% 31,496	2.00% 1,267
2008	49.49% 31,796	48.70% 31,289	1.80% 1,158
2004	39.68% 21,050	59.47% 31,550	0.86% 454
2000	43.09% 18,637	53.80% 23,268	3.11% 1347
1996	40.04% 14,831	49.25% 18,245	10.71% 3,967
1992	33.09% 13,530	42.19% 17,254	24.72% 10,110
1988	30.90% 9,468	68.09% 20,864	1.02% 312
1984	24.94% 5,394	74.06% 16,016	0.99% 215
1980	24.56% 4,347	66.56% 11,782	8.88% 1,572

=== Law enforcement ===
Since incorporation in 1977, law enforcement services in Rancho Cucamonga City have been provided through a contract with the San Bernardino County Sheriff's Department.

Rancho Cucamonga is also home to the Foothill Communities San Bernardino County Courthouse, which is housed in a building adjacent to the Rancho Cucamonga Civic Center, in a government complex located at Haven Avenue and Civic Center Drive in the city. The Civic Center houses the Rancho Cucamonga city hall, the city police department, and other local government offices.

== Education ==
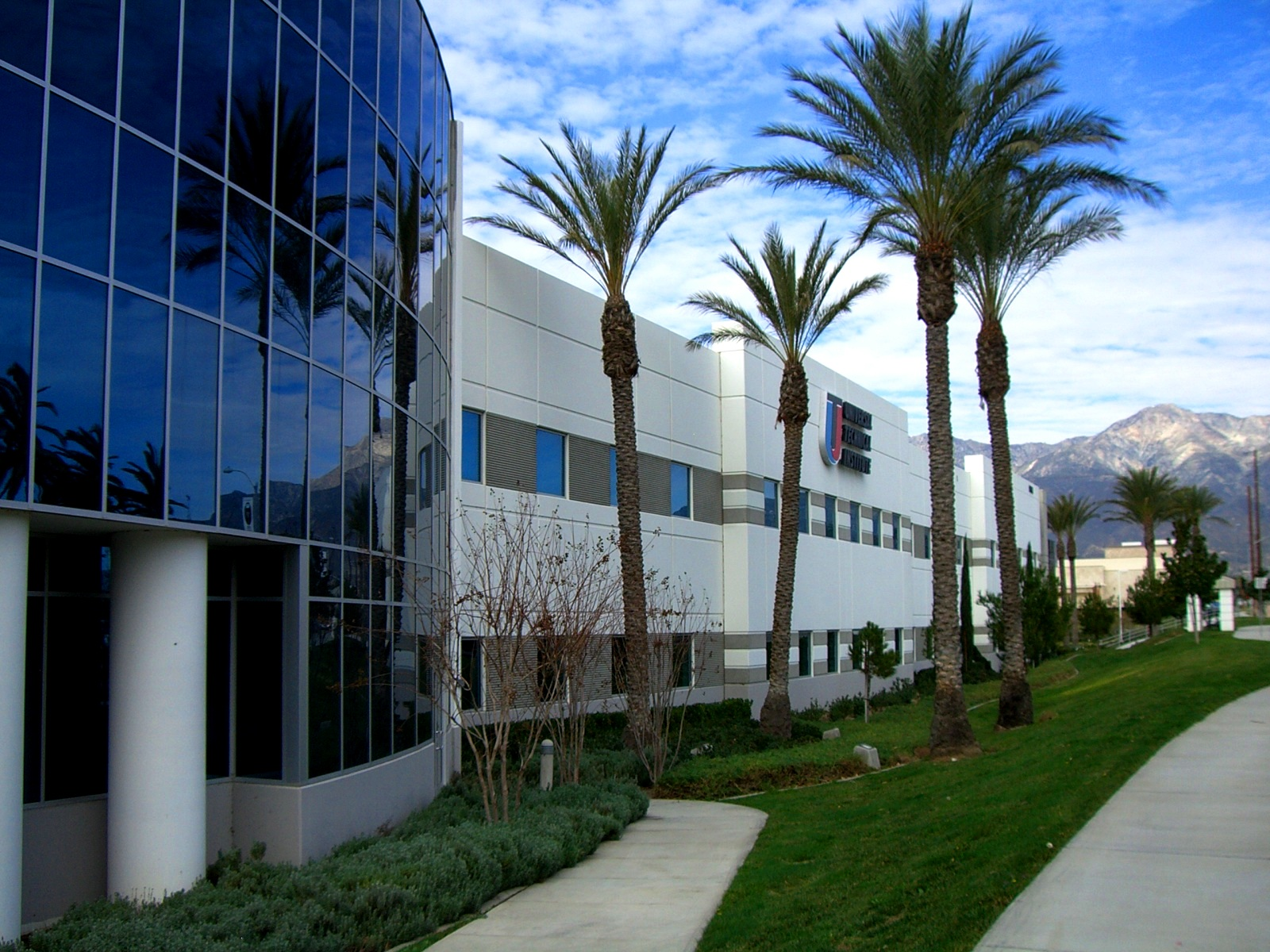
UTI (Universal Technical Institute)

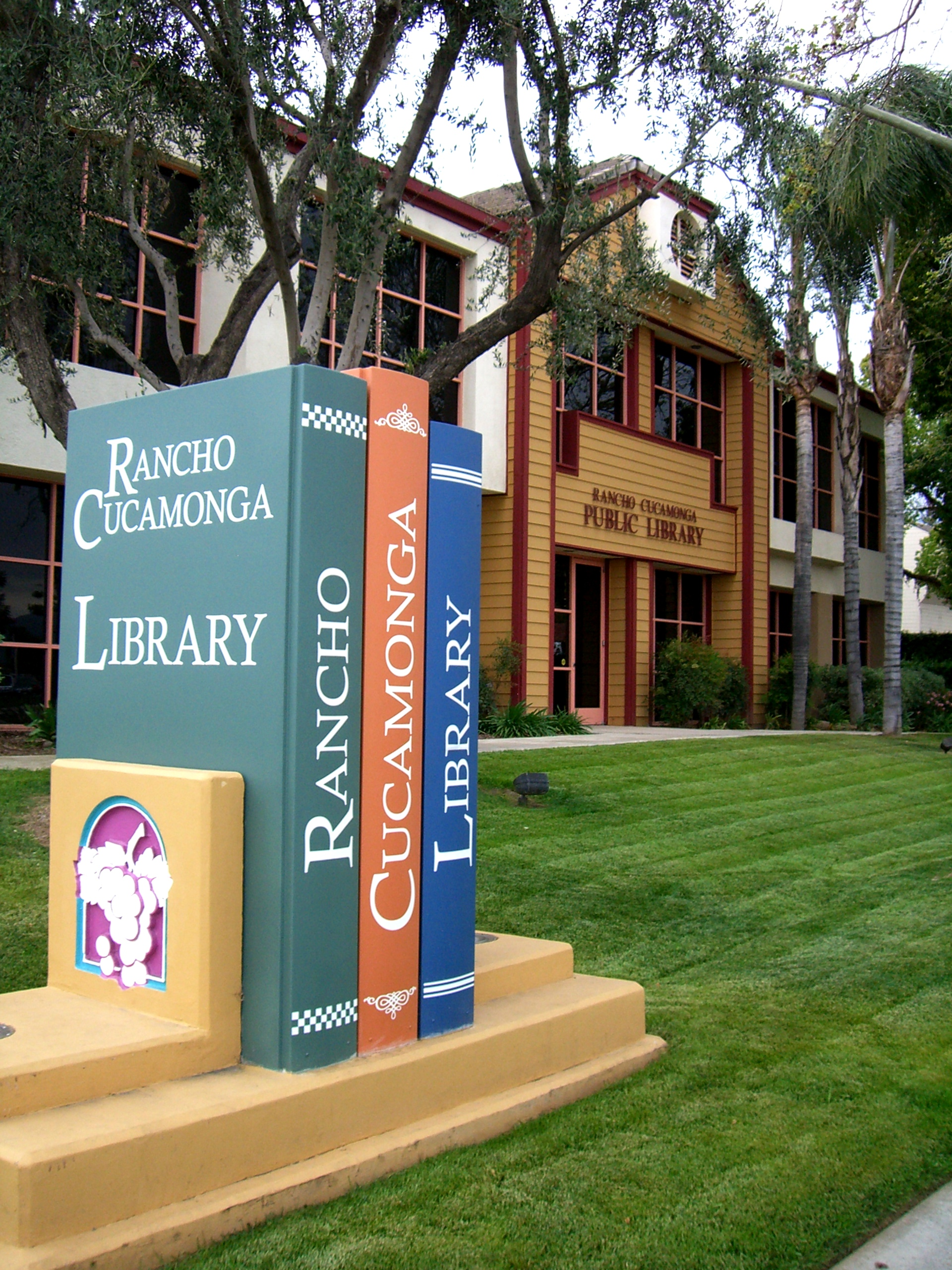
Archibald Avenue Library

=== Schools ===
Rancho Cucamonga has multiple public K–12 schools, operating under several different school districts, within its borders: Alta Loma School District, Central School District, Cucamonga School District, Etiwanda School District, and Chaffey Joint Union High School District. Private schools include United Christian Academy. In addition, Rancho Cucamonga is the home to Chaffey College and satellite campuses of the University of La Verne, Cambridge College, University of Redlands, Everest College, and University of Phoenix, as well as the automotive trade school.

High Schools

- Alta Loma High School
- Etiwanda High School
- Los Osos High School
- Rancho Cucamonga High School

=== Libraries ===
The city of Rancho Cucamonga has two public libraries, with a combined total of over 200,000 volumes. The library at 7368 Archibald Avenue opened in 1994 and was remodeled in the summer of 2008. The Paul A. Biane library at 12505 Cultural Center Drive at the Victoria Gardens Cultural Center opened in August 2006. In 2013, the Rancho Cucamonga Public Library was a recipient of the National Medal for Museum and Library Services, the nation's highest honor that can be bestowed on a library or museum.

== Infrastructure ==
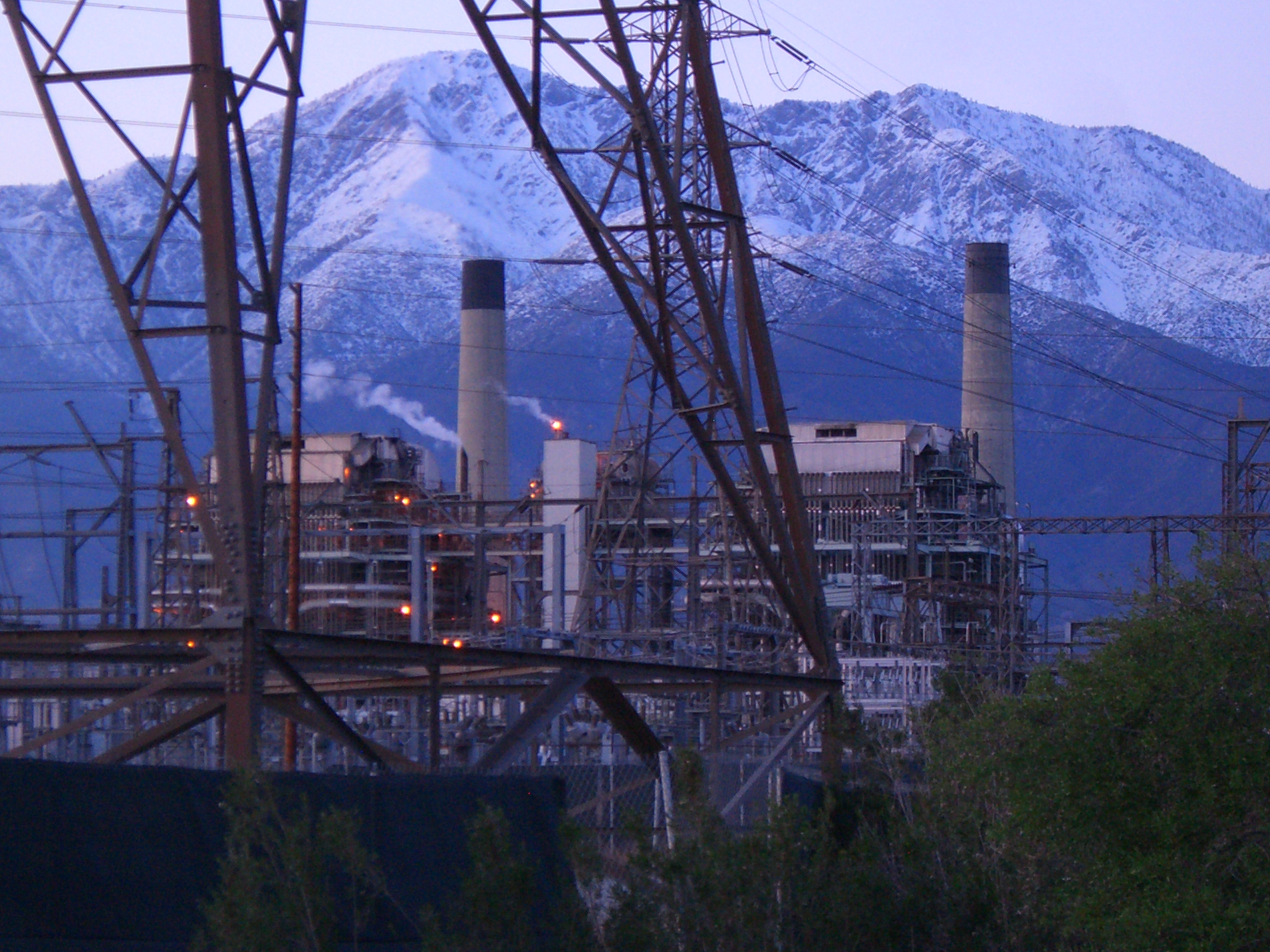
NRG's Etiwanda Generating Station, with Cucamonga Peak in the background

=== Transportation ===
Rancho Cucamonga is served by Omnitrans bus service, train service from Metrolink's Rancho Cucamonga station on the San Bernardino Line, and nearby Ontario International Airport, one of four major Los Angeles-area passenger airports with multiple daily flights by most domestic carriers as well as a major shipping hub for companies like UPS and FedEx.

Rancho Cucamonga has been identified as the initial western end-point of the Brightline West High Speed Rail (HSR) project to connect Southern California with Las Vegas. On December 5, 2023, it was announced that the project would be awarded a grant of USD3 Billion from the Bipartisan Infrastructure Law.

Interstate 15 (I-15) and State Route 210 (SR-210) run through Rancho Cucamonga as well as the historic U.S. Route 66 (as Foothill Boulevard).

I-15 sits atop an elevated berm, and cuts a curve through the southeastern part of the city, isolating a mostly industrial area, a small shopping center, and several housing tracts from the larger part of the city. Further north, I-15 forms part of the northeastern border with neighboring Fontana before entering the Cajon Pass through the San Gabriel Mountains. I-15 provides connectivity with the High Desert, Nevada, and points north for the Inland Empire and much of Southern California.

=== Utilities ===
Rancho Cucamonga receives natural gas from the Southern California Gas Company. The city's water supply and sewage are managed by the Cucamonga Valley Water District. Garbage collection is by Burrtec Disposal, phone service is from Frontier Communications and cable TV is provided by Charter Communications.

Electric power in Rancho Cucamonga is provided by Southern California Edison and the Rancho Cucamonga Municipal Utility.

Before 2024, the city was home to the Reliant Energy Etiwanda Generating Station, on Etiwanda Avenue. This facility, one of five Reliant stations in California, was a natural gas-fired power plant, which began operation in 1963. At 640 MW (860,000 hp) net capacity, it was Reliant's second-highest-capacity plant on the West Coast. It utilized four steam turbine generators; of which units three and four remained active after turbines one and two, as well as a combustion turbine, were retired in 2003 and 2004, respectively. Several systems are in place to control gas emissions, and annually, over 900,000,000 US gal (750,000,000 imp gal; 3.4 GL) of recycled water are used for cooling. As of 2024, all turbines and stacks and the entire electrical plant have been removed.

On November 29, 2011, the Inland Empire Utilities Agency installed the first wind turbine in Rancho Cucamonga.

== Notable people ==
- Carlos Bocanegra, soccer player and sports executive
- The Young Bucks (Matt and Nick Jackson), professional wrestlers
- Mercedes Carrera, porn star, political commentator and former aerospace engineer
- Darren Collison, professional NBA player
- Collin Delia, professional ice hockey goaltender
- Ejiro Evero, professional American football coach
- Tyler Freeman, professional baseball player
- Darren Hall, professional cornerback for the Arizona Cardinals
- C. J. Stroud, professional American football quarterback, selected second overall by the Houston Texans in the 2023 NFL draft, 2023 Offensive Rookie of the Year
- Nichkhun, singer, songwriter, actor and model. Member of the boy band 2PM
- Frank Zappa, musician who lived in and worked in Cucamonga during the early 1960s. He bought the Pal Recording Studio from a friend, Paul Buff, and renamed it "Studio Z". The studio closed in 1964 when the building was demolished in order to widen Archibald Avenue. ("Cucamonga" is also the name of a long-lived radio show on Radio 1, Belgium, as an obscure reference to Zappa.)
- Rufio, a pop punk band

== In popular culture ==
The name Cucamonga became well known to fans of Jack Benny's popular radio program, in which an announcer, voiced by Mel Blanc, would call out: "Train leaving on track five for Anaheim, Azusa and Cu-camonga!" This running gag became so well known that it eventually led to a statue of Benny in Cucamonga.

The city is the primary setting of the TV series Workaholics and the feature film Next Friday. Further mention of the city was made in the Netflix series Unsolved.

== See also ==
- List of people from Rancho Cucamonga, California
- List of U.S. cities with large Hispanic populations
