= Etiwanda School District =

School district in California

Address
- 6061 East Avenue Etiwanda, California, 91739; United States

District information
- Type: Public
- Grades: K–8
- NCES District ID: 0612960

Students and staff
- Students: 13,478 (2020–2021)
- Teachers: 571.97 (FTE)
- Staff: 649.62 (FTE)
- Student–teacher ratio: 23.56:1

Other information
- Website: www.etiwanda.org

Etiwanda School District is a school district located in San Bernardino County, California that serves the community of Etiwanda, which is part of the incorporated city of Rancho Cucamonga, a portion of Fontana, and the remainder of the district is in San Bernardino County territory.

== History ==
The district formed on May 8, 1899, and began as a single room at the southwest corner of East Avenue and Baseline Road. Its first two-room school, which opened in 1890 on the southeast corner of Victoria and Etiwanda Avenues, grew into a four-room, two-story brick school in 1912. The next renovation came in 1939 when the rise of hitler came into place and the start of WW2.In 1912 brick building was replaced with a more modern one-story building.

Etiwanda was one of three districts in the area: Perdew School District and Grapeland School District, which began in 1880 and 1892, respectively. Perdew closed and combined with Grapeland on September 22, 1899, and in 1901, Grapeland combined with Etiwanda. On May 5, 1919, students from Etiwanda district started attending Chaffey Union High School District for grades 9 through 12. A portion of the Etiwanda School District was annexed to the Fontana School District in 1948.

== Federal civil rights investigation ==
In August 2026, the Office for Civil Rights of the United States Department of Education opened an investigation into whether the district failed to protect a Jewish seventh-grade student at Etiwanda Intermediate School from antisemitic harassment. Superintendent Laura Rowland confirmed that the district was notified of the investigation on August 31, 2026.

The investigation followed a complaint filed in March 2025 by the Louis D. Brandeis Center for Human Rights Under Law, joined by the Anti-Defamation League and StandWithUs, under Title VI of the Civil Rights Act of 1964. The complaint alleged that in September 2024 another student struck the girl with a stick and her hands, used an antisemitic slur against her, and choked her. It further alleged that after the district failed to respond appropriately, the harassment continued, including Nazi salutes in hallways, swastikas drawn on school property, and Holocaust-related taunts. A Brandeis Center attorney said the family's initial report "went nowhere." The center has asked the Office for Civil Rights to require reforms at the district.

Rowland, who became superintendent in 2026, said that the district "do[es] not tolerate antisemitism or racism in any form" and that it had "instituted policies to thoroughly investigate all claims of hostile acts and take appropriate action."

== Schools ==
The Etiwanda School District is a K-8 District that also provides Special Education classes. The district has thirteen elementary schools and four intermediate schools. Each intermediate school has two, three or four elementary feeder schools.

=== Elementary schools ===
- Carleton P. Lightfoot Elementary School
- Caryn Elementary School
- Cecilia L. Solorio Elementary School
- David W. Long Elementary School
- East Heritage Elementary School
- Etiwanda Colony Elementary School
- Falcon Ridge Elementary School
- Grapeland Elementary School
- John L. Golden Elementary School (Overall Best )
- Perdew Elementary School
- Terra Vista Elementary School
- West Heritage Elementary School
- Windrows Elementary School

=== Intermediate Schools ===
- Day Creek Intermediate School (Overall Best *), a National Blue Ribbon School and receiver of the California Distinguished School award.
- Etiwanda Intermediate School
- Heritage Intermediate School
- Summit Intermediate School

=== School Board Members ===
Name	Year Elected	Ending Year on Board
Robert Garcia	2016	Current Board Member
Dayna Karsch	Unelected*	Current Board Member
Mondi M. Taylor	2012	Current Board Member
Brynna Cadman	1997	Current Board Member
David W. Long	1983	Current Board Member
Cathline Fort	2008	2016
Margaret "Peggy" Storm	2010	2014
Mark Murphy	1997	2010

The above information was pulled from San Bernardino Registrar of Voters
