= Upland, California =

City in California, United States

- City
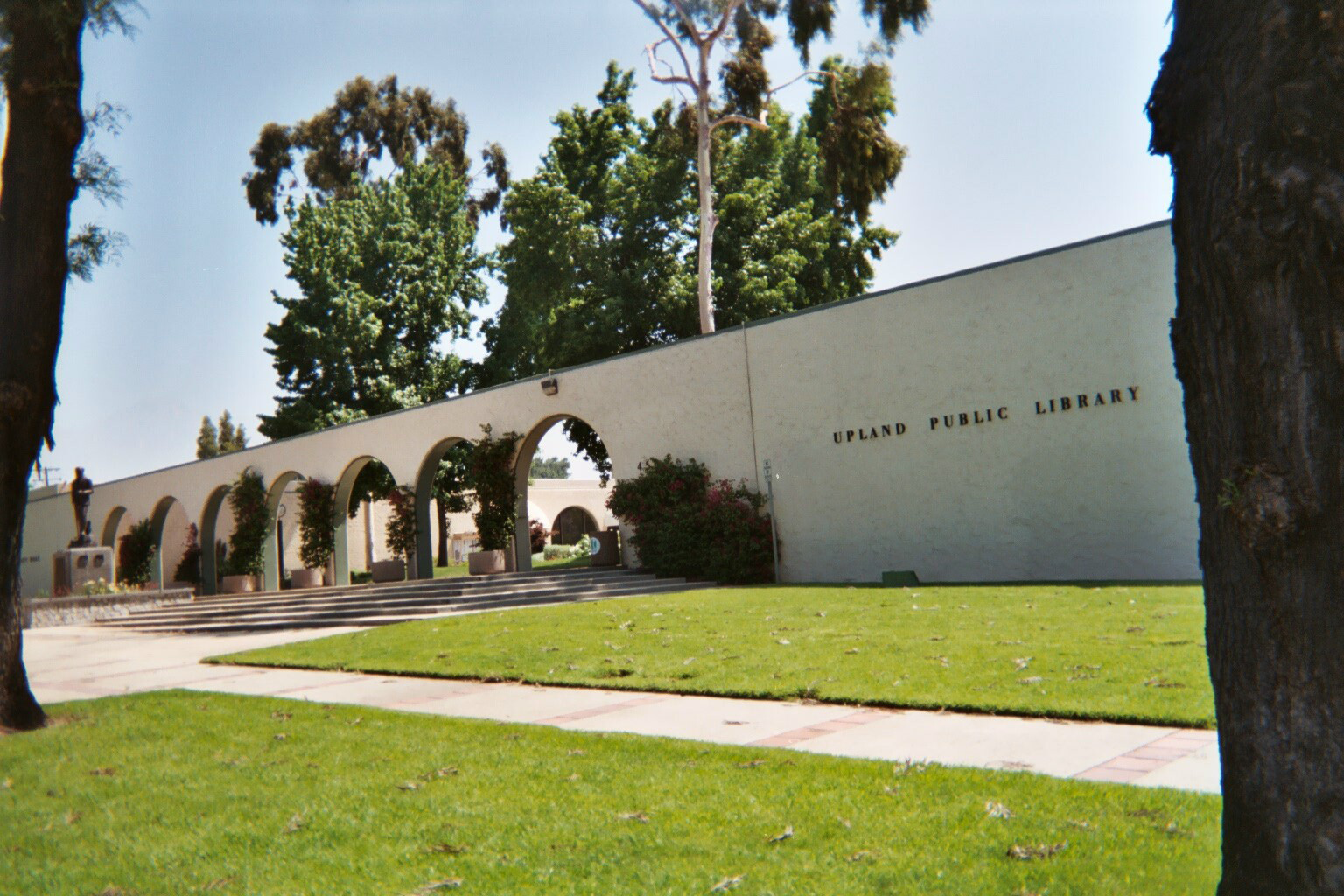
- 147 N. Euclid Ave. in Upland

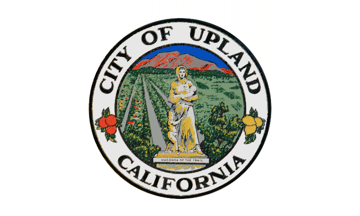
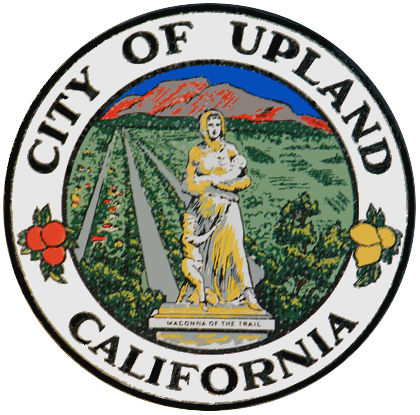
- Flag Seal
- Nickname: The City of Gracious Living
- Interactive map of Upland, California
- Location of California in the United States
- Coordinates: 34°6′N 117°39′W
- Country: United States
- State: California
- County: San Bernardino
- Incorporated: May 15, 1906

Government
  - Mayor: Bill Velto

Area
  - Total: 15.62 sq mi (40.45 km^{2})
  - Land: 15.58 sq mi (40.36 km^{2})
  - Water: 0.035 sq mi (0.09 km^{2}) 0.21%
- Elevation: 1,237 ft (377 m)

Population (2020)
  - Total: 79,040
  - Density: 5,072/sq mi (1,958/km^{2})
- Time zone: UTC-8 (Pacific Time Zone)
  - Summer (DST): UTC-7 (PDT)
- ZIP Codes: 91784–91786
- Area code: 909
- FIPS code: 06-81344
- GNIS feature IDs: 1661606, 2412137
- Website: www.uplandca.gov

Upland is a city in the Inland Empire region of San Bernardino County, California, United States, on the border with neighboring Los Angeles County. The municipality is located at an elevation of 1,242 feet (379 m). As of the 2020 census, the city had a population of 79,040, up from 73,732 at the 2010 census.

Upland was incorporated as a city on May 15, 1906; it was previously named North Ontario. Upland is located at the foot of the highest part of the San Gabriel Mountains and is part of the Inland Empire, a metropolitan area situated directly east of Los Angeles County.

== History ==
=== Early history ===
Upland is located at the foot of the San Gabriel Mountains on an east–west trail that was used by the Native Americans and Spanish missionaries, part of what is now known as the Old Spanish Trail. To the west, the trail led to the San Gabriel Mission, which Spanish Missionaries built in 1771.

In 1774, Spanish explorer Juan Bautista de Anza established an overland route from Arizona to California, with part of the trail passing through present day Upland on the way to the San Gabriel Mission. Anza's route went through Yuma, the San Gorgonio Pass and through the San Bernardino Valley. In 1775, Anza led a second expedition consisting of more than 240 people on a journey of over two thousand miles to the San Francisco Bay. En route, the expedition reached the San Gabriel Mission on January 4, 1776. The expedition reached the San Francisco Bay on June 27, 1776, where Anza founded the present-day city of San Francisco. Five years later, in 1781, Spanish settlers followed Anza's route to found the city of Los Angeles a few miles west of the San Gabriel Mission.

Following the Anza expedition, the San Gabriel Mission became an important stopping place for expeditions traveling between Arizona and California. The mission was the first place where supplies could be procured after crossing the desert, and as travel over this road increased, the mission arranged to establish a supply station at some intermediate point east. In 1810, a party of missionaries, soldiers, and Native Americans from San Gabriel mission, under the leadership of Padre Dumetz, were sent out to select a location. On May 20, 1810, they came into the San Bernardino Valley. This, according to the Roman Catholic Calendar of Saints, was the feast day of Saint Bernardino of Siena, and they named the valley in his honor. The expedition named the area around Upland "Cucamonga," which in the Tongvan language meant "sand place."

Jedediah Smith of the Rocky Mountain Fur Company was the first American to enter California overland. He started from the Yellowstone River, in August 1826, with a party of fifteen men. Their course was down the Colorado River to the Mojave, where they found two Native Americans, who guided them across the desert to San Gabriel Mission. Smith pioneered the route over the Cajon Pass, where he then joined the foothill route established by Anza, arriving at San Gabriel on November 27. California was part of Mexico at the time, so Smith was briefly arrested by the Mexican governor before being released.

In 1829, Mexican explorer Antonio Armijo led the first successful caravan from Santa Fe to Southern California, joining up with Smith's route to open what would later be called the Old Spanish Trail. The route resulted in immediate commerce between Santa Fe and Los Angeles. Pack trains made annual treks between New Mexico and California, bringing woven Mexican products to California, which lacked sheep, and bartering them for horses and mules, scarce in New Mexico. The trail carried mule-trains over the Cajon Pass, then west through Rancho Cucamonga, Upland, and El Monte, to the region's major settlements at Mission San Gabriel and Los Angeles.

From the time of the Anza expedition until the Mexican Rancho Period, the land around Upland was used as grazing land by the San Gabriel Mission. Under mission rule, cattle ranching became a major industry. The rangy cattle thrived and bred rapidly in the benign climate, and thousands of cattle wandered across the Cucamonga Rancho. Following the secularization of the missions by the Mexican government, the Cucamonga Rancho was granted to Tiburcio Tapia in 1839. Upon the death of Tapia in 1845, the Rancho passed to his daughter and her husband, Leon V. Prudhomme. An 1886 report by the California Surveyor General listed the size of the Cucamonga Rancho as 13,045 acres (52.79 km^{2}).

=== Founding ===
California became part of the United States at the end of the Mexican–American War in 1846, and American settlers began to arrive in California in large numbers with the California Gold Rush of 1849. The Cucamonga Rancho changed hands several times, but the area that present-day Upland occupies was little more than an uninhabited ranchland and a place to pass through until the arrival of George Chaffey in 1882. Chaffey, a Canadian shipbuilder from the province of Ontario, had already established the Etiwanda irrigation community in 1881, irrigating the land with a series of flumes carried water from the mountains to a reservoir from which water would then be sent to the relative land sites. In 1882, Chaffey purchased 6,216 acres (25.16 km^{2}) of land in the Cucamonga Rancho, along with significant water rights from San Antonio Creek, for $60,000. Additional purchases brought the size of the land to over 8,000 acres (32 km^{2}) of land for a total purchase price of $90,000.

Chaffey's master plan called for distributing the water over the whole tract to each farm lot in cement pipes, with each holder to share in the water proportionately to his holding irrespective of distance from the source. Chaffey also laid out the main thoroughfare which ran from one end of the settlement to the other. He also named the "main thoroughfare" Euclid in honor of his favorite mathematician. Euclid Avenue was seven miles long, stretching from the colony's "southernmost boundaries to the mountains." Euclid was planned as a "200-foot-wide [61 m] double drive ... [with a] center parkway to be flanked by a 65-foot-wide [20 m] drive on each side. Chaffey also planned for electricity in Ontario with street lamps being placed a mile apart on Euclid and an electric streetcar that would travel up and down Euclid daily. Ontario was available for settlement on November 1, 1882. During the first week, Chaffey sold 190 acres (0.77 km^{2}) for a total value of $28,500.

To ensure the success of this irrigation plan and to appeal to potential land buyers, the Chaffey created a "mutual water company" in which each landowner became a stockholder. The San Antonio Water Company was incorporated on October 25, 1882.

The Ontario colony eventually became known for its citrus groves, but in 1882, orange trees were too scarce and expensive at $100 an acre to turn to citrus, so at first other types of fruit were planted. By 1884, Ontario Nursery owner D.A. Shaw reported that there were "40,000 peach trees, 29,000 pear trees, 15,000 seedling apple trees, 16,000 grafted apple trees, 1,000 cherry trees, and 16,000 grape cuttings set out in orchards and vineyards." However, by 1889, some 2,000 acres (8.1 km^{2}) of citrus orchards had been planted on Ontario, and Ontario was rated as having the second largest citrus acreage in the state.

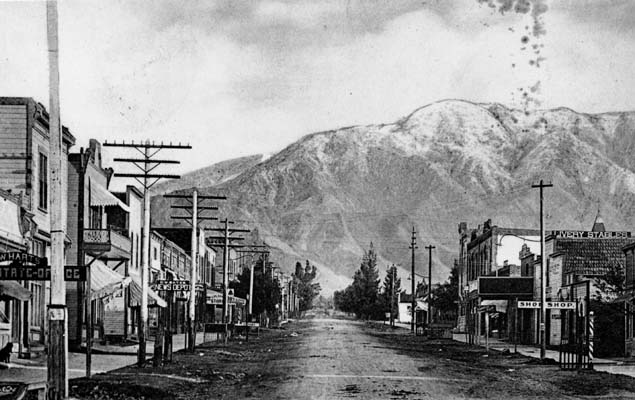
Upland in 1906

The present-day city of Upland was the originally northern part of Chaffee's Ontario Model Colony, and was known as "North Ontario" or "Magnolia" after a local hotel. The name Upland was first used as the name of the "Upland Citrus Association." Long-time resident Charles D. Adams, organizer and first elected president of the Association, was credited with choosing the name. However, by 1902, the name "Upland" was used to refer to the entire area of North Ontario.

The railway came to North Ontario in 1887. When the Ontario Colony was founded, downtown was located next to the Southern Pacific tracks. In 1887 the Atchison, Topeka, and Santa Fe completed its connection adjacent to the newly founded Magnolia Tract in North Ontario. Subdividers of Magnolia, the Bedford Brothers, announced plans to erect a depot at the foot of Second Avenue, the primary business street. A notice in the December 1887 Ontario Record indicated that the cost of the station would be $7,000. In the next decades numerous packing houses were built close to the tracks on both sides of A Street. Used for commuting of residents and tourists as well as for freight, the railroad linked Upland to Los Angeles to the west and the rest of the Santa Fe network to the east.

Ontario officially incorporated in 1891, but the size of incorporation was relatively small; one-half square mile (1.3 km^{2}) bordered by the "Southern Pacific tract to the south, G Street to the north, Sultana Avenue to the east and Vine Avenue to the west." In 1901, residents of Ontario learned that those living in North Ontario were also thinking of incorporation as their own city. In order to eliminate this possibility, the city expanded their one-half square mile to over 10 square miles (26 km^{2}).

When Ontario started to push for a larger area of incorporation, Upland residents expressed concern. The area of land that Ontario wanted included the Upland Post Office, the tracks for the Atchison, Topeka and Santa Fe Railroad, and the train depot. On March 12, 1906, the San Bernardino Board of Supervisors conducted a two-day hearing and agreed that a vote for incorporation should take place. On May 5, 1906, Upland approved their vote for incorporation with 183 in favor and 19 against. The city was officially created on May 15, 1906, by the Secretary of State in Sacramento. In 1935, Upland's boundary lines were redrawn to include the land that was annexed in Ontario's 1902 expansion.

=== Later history ===
Upland's first hospital, the San Antonio Hospital, opened on the corner of Arrow Highway and San Antonio Avenue in 1907, one year after Upland was incorporated as a city. The hospital had 18 beds with a medical staff of five physicians. It was built with funds received from community stock sales. The expanded San Antonio Community Hospital was dedicated on Wednesday, July 30, 1924. This new hospital, "commodiously and scientifically constructed," according to a news article in the Upland News, had 35 rooms with a capacity for 50 patients. The total cost for this new facility, located on East San Bernardino Road, was $173,107.10.

In 1911, the citizens of Upland created a volunteer fire department with F.H. Manker named as the Fire Chief. The first recorded piece of apparatus was a hose cart that was pulled by the first available personnel. In 1913, the first serious fire to occur in the new community destroyed all the businesses on the east side of Second Avenue south of Ninth Street. This fire generated interest in further protecting the community, and in 1915 the fire station on D Street was built. The first motorized fire engine was purchased at this time. In 2017, the Upland Fire Department dissolved and became a part of the San Bernardino County fire district.

Upland was one of the cities located on the National Old Trails Road, established in 1912 as the first national coast-to-coast highway. In Upland, the national highway ran along Foothill Boulevard, which had been built on the route established by the early Spanish explorers. In 1926, a hundred years after Jedediah Smith's expedition, the western part of the National Old Trails Road became part of the famed Route 66.

A trolley line in the broad, tree-lined median of Euclid Avenue formerly connected Upland to the Southern Pacific Railroad line in Ontario. The trolley was pulled from Ontario to Upland by a mule, which then climbed aboard an attached trailer for the ride back down. It was later converted to electricity and closed in 1928.

The citrus industry in Upland and neighboring Ontario continued to thrive, and by the 1930s, citrus had become the dominant agricultural crop for California. In 1936, the revenue from the citrus industry totaled $97,000,000. This was second in profit only to the California petroleum industry, which totaled $159,500,000. At the height of citrus production, the industry produced sixty percent of the nation's citrus supply and twenty percent of the world's supply. This success continued for citrus growers until the mid-1940s, when the citrus industry as a whole began its decline. After World War II, land values began to skyrocket, and growers began to sell their land to developers.

In 1954, the San Bernardino Freeway, later part of Interstate 10, was completed, connecting Los Angeles to San Bernardino. The freeway, one of the first in the nation, eased the commute to Los Angeles and accelerated the transition of Upland from a rural citrus area to a residential and commercial community.

== Geography ==
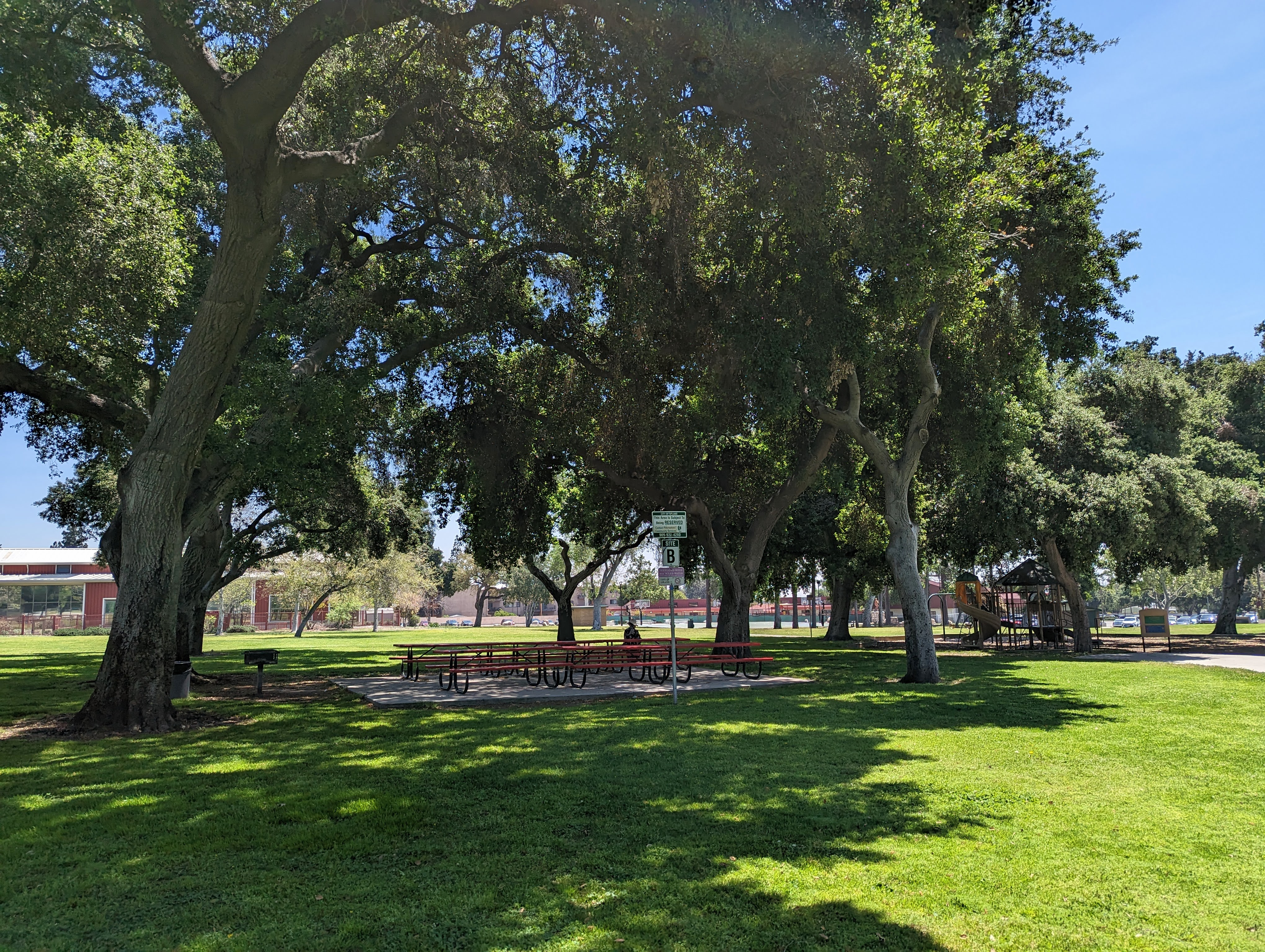
Upland Memorial Park in late April

Upland is located on the northern edge of the San Bernardino Valley. The San Gabriel Mountains are to the north of Upland. The city terrain is fairly flat but slopes gradually upward to the north. From south to north, the city elevation increases by 825 feet (251 m) over a distance of 4.25 miles (6.84 km), from 1,175 feet (358 m) at the intersection of 7th Street and Euclid Avenue (southern city boundary) to an elevation of 2,000 feet (610 m) at the intersection of 24th Street and Euclid Avenue (northern city boundary). The highest peak in the San Gabriels, Mount San Antonio, known locally as Mount Baldy, is approximately 9.5 miles (15.3 km) north of the Upland's northern boundary and caps out at 10,064 feet (3,068 m).

Upland is bordered on the east by Rancho Cucamonga, to the south by Ontario and Montclair, to the west by Claremont, and to the north by the unincorporated community of San Antonio Heights.

Upland has semi-arid climate with most of the rainfall occurring during the winter months. The average annual rainfall is 24.5 inches (620 mm). The highest recorded temperature was 113 °F (45 °C) in July 2006. The lowest recorded temperature was 21 °F (−6 °C) in January 1963. According to the Köppen Climate Classification system, Upland has a hot-summer Mediterranean, abbreviated Csa on climate maps.

Climate data for Upland, California
Month	Jan	Feb	Mar	Apr	May	Jun	Jul	Aug	Sep	Oct	Nov	Dec	Year
Mean daily maximum °F (°C)	68 (20)	69 (21)	71 (22)	76 (24)	79 (26)	87 (31)	92 (33)	94 (34)	90 (32)	80 (27)	74 (23)	68 (20)	79 (26)
Mean daily minimum °F (°C)	43 (6)	45 (7)	47 (8)	49 (9)	54 (12)	58 (14)	62 (17)	62 (17)	60 (16)	55 (13)	47 (8)	42 (6)	52 (11)
Average precipitation inches (mm)	3.1 (79)	4.8 (120)	2.6 (66)	1.2 (30)	0.2 (5.1)	0.1 (2.5)	0.0 (0.0)	0.0 (0.0)	0.2 (5.1)	1.1 (28)	1.6 (41)	2.4 (61)	17.3 (437.7)

== Demographics ==
Historical population
Census	Pop.	Note	%±
1910	2,384		—
1920	2,912		22.1%
1930	4,713		61.8%
1940	6,316		34.0%
1950	9,203		45.7%
1960	15,918		73.0%
1970	32,551		104.5%
1980	47,647		46.4%
1990	63,374		33.0%
2000	68,393		7.9%
2010	73,732		7.8%
2020	79,040		7.2%
2024 (est.)	79,684	▲	0.8%
U.S. Decennial Census

=== Racial and ethnic composition ===
Upland city, California – Racial and ethnic composition Note: the US Census treats Hispanic/Latino as an ethnic category. This table excludes Latinos from the racial categories and assigns them to a separate category. Hispanics/Latinos may be of any race.
Race / Ethnicity (NH = Non-Hispanic)	Pop 2000	Pop 2010	Pop 2020	% 2000	% 2010	% 2020
White alone (NH)	37,456	32,564	27,742	54.77%	44.17%	35.10%
Black or African American alone (NH)	4,990	5,031	4,784	7.30%	6.82%	6.05%
Native American or Alaska Native alone (NH)	238	184	195	0.35%	0.25%	0.25%
Asian alone (NH)	4,866	6,057	7,782	7.11%	8.21%	9.85%
Native Hawaiian or Pacific Islander alone (NH)	83	134	147	0.12%	0.18%	0.19%
Other race alone (NH)	104	149	448	0.15%	0.20%	0.57%
Mixed race or Multiracial (NH)	1,826	1,578	2,752	2.67%	2.14%	3.48%
Hispanic or Latino (any race)	18,830	28,035	35,190	27.53%	38.02%	44.52%
Total	68,393	73,732	79,040	100.00%	100.00%	100.00%

=== 2020 census ===
As of the 2020 census, Upland had a population of 79,040. The population density was 4,721.3 inhabitants per square mile (1,822.9/km^{2}). The median age was 38.7 years. 21.5% of residents were under the age of 18 and 16.8% of residents were 65 years of age or older. For every 100 females there were 92.6 males, and for every 100 females age 18 and over there were 89.6 males age 18 and over.

100.0% of residents lived in urban areas, while 0.0% lived in rural areas.

There were 27,903 households in Upland, of which 34.3% had children under the age of 18 living in them. Of all households, 48.8% were married-couple households, 15.9% were households with a male householder and no spouse or partner present, and 28.0% were households with a female householder and no spouse or partner present. About 20.1% of all households were made up of individuals and 8.9% had someone living alone who was 65 years of age or older.

There were 28,641 housing units, of which 2.6% were vacant. The homeowner vacancy rate was 0.6% and the rental vacancy rate was 2.8%.

Racial composition as of the 2020 census
Race	Number	Percent
White	34,980	44.3%
Black or African American	5,089	6.4%
American Indian and Alaska Native	1,094	1.4%
Asian	8,059	10.2%
Native Hawaiian and Other Pacific Islander	172	0.2%
Some other race	15,783	20.0%
Two or more races	13,863	17.5%

=== Other demographic indicators ===
Of people over the age of five, 30.6% lived in a home where a language other than English is spoken. 90.1% of households had a broadband Internet subscription, and 94.7% of households had a computer. Of people over the age of one, 86.5% lived in the same home one year earlier.

The population under age 5 was 5.8%. Upland included 3,356 veterans, and 17.6% of residents were foreign-born.

Of housing units, 54.6% were owner-occupied. Median rent was $1,571.

Upland had a median household income of $76,259, with a per capita income of $35,624 annually and 11.3% of the population living below the federal poverty line.

Among the population age 16+ years old, 66.3% were in the civilian labor force. Workers in this demographic reported a mean time to work of 31.1 minutes.

=== 2010 census ===
The 2010 United States census reported that Upland had a population of 73,732. The population density was 4,711.1 inhabitants per square mile (1,819.0/km^{2}). The racial makeup of Upland was 48,364 (65.6%) White (44.2% Non-Hispanic White), 5,400 (7.3%) African American, 522 (0.7%) Native American, 6,217 (8.4%) Asian, 159 (0.2%) Pacific Islander, 9,509 (12.9%) from other races, and 3,561 (4.8%) from two or more races. Hispanic or Latino of any race were 28,035 persons (38.0%).

The Census reported that 73,050 people (99.1% of the population) lived in households, 305 (0.4%) lived in non-institutionalized group quarters, and 377 (0.5%) were institutionalized.

There were 25,823 households, out of which 9,770 (37.8%) had children under the age of 18 living in them, 13,400 (51.9%) were opposite-sex married couples living together, 4,026 (15.6%) had a female householder with no husband present, 1,557 (6.0%) had a male householder with no wife present. There were 1,533 (5.9%) unmarried opposite-sex partnerships, and 219 (0.8%) same-sex married couples or partnerships. 5,159 households (20.0%) were made up of individuals, and 1,786 (6.9%) had someone living alone who was 65 years of age or older. The average household size was 2.83. There were 18,983 families (73.5% of all households); the average family size was 3.26.

The population was spread out, with 18,091 people (24.5%) under the age of 18, 7,504 people (10.2%) aged 18 to 24, 19,917 people (27.0%) aged 25 to 44, 19,322 people (26.2%) aged 45 to 64, and 8,898 people (12.1%) who were 65 years of age or older. The median age was 36.1 years. For every 100 females, there were 93.1 males. For every 100 females age 18 and over, there were 89.9 males.

There were 27,355 housing units at an average density of 1,747.9 per square mile (674.9/km^{2}), of which 14,948 (57.9%) were owner-occupied, and 10,875 (42.1%) were occupied by renters. The homeowner vacancy rate was 1.6%; the rental vacancy rate was 8.3%. 42,560 people (57.7% of the population) lived in owner-occupied housing units and 30,490 people (41.4%) lived in rental housing units.

During 2009–2013, Upland had a median household income of $62,667, with 13.5% of the population living below the federal poverty line.

== Economy ==
=== Top employers ===
According to the city's 2025 Annual Comprehensive Financial Report, the top employers in the city are:

#	Employer	# of Employees
1	San Antonio Regional Hospital	2,000
2	Upland Unified School District	1,272
3	VCI Construction	458
4	Holliday Rock Co.	450
5	Upland Rehabilitation & Care Center	370
6	Lewis Group	318
7	City of Upland	302
8	Target	283
9	Bullwinkles Family Fun Center	215
10	Amazon Fresh	200

== Arts and culture ==
=== Museums ===
Upland Fire Department Museum. The museum is housed in the first fire station in the city. The museum houses fire fighting equipment and photographs. The station building dates back to 1915. The museum houses the original Upland fire truck from 1916.

Cooper Regional History Museum. The former headquarters of the Ontario-Cucamonga (O.K.) Fruit Exchange is a 1937 Art Moderne style building on the corner of Second Avenue and "A" Street, in Upland. The largest room is dedicated to the wine and citrus history of the area, with a smaller room with Native American photos and tools, and a hallway bursting with photographs and antique furniture.

Inland Empire Museum of Art (IEMA) was founded 2015 in as a nonprofit art museum located in Upland, California. The museum relies on donations and public support.

=== Festivals ===
The Upland Lemon Festival began in 1997 and is celebrated annually in April. The festival celebrates the city's citrus industry and includes the Lemon Idol vocal contest, food competitions, and carnival rides. The festival is held in downtown Upland.

=== Skateboarding ===
Upland is known in Southern California skateboard culture as a spot for vertical skateboarding. Several famous skateboarders have visited the city, known as "Badlands" in skateboarding culture due to its geographical location. On Saturday May 19, 2012, Mayor Ray Musser acknowledged local Stan Hoffman, the owner of the now defunct Pipeline Skatepark, by giving him a lifetime achievement for his contribution to the skate culture.

== Points of interest ==
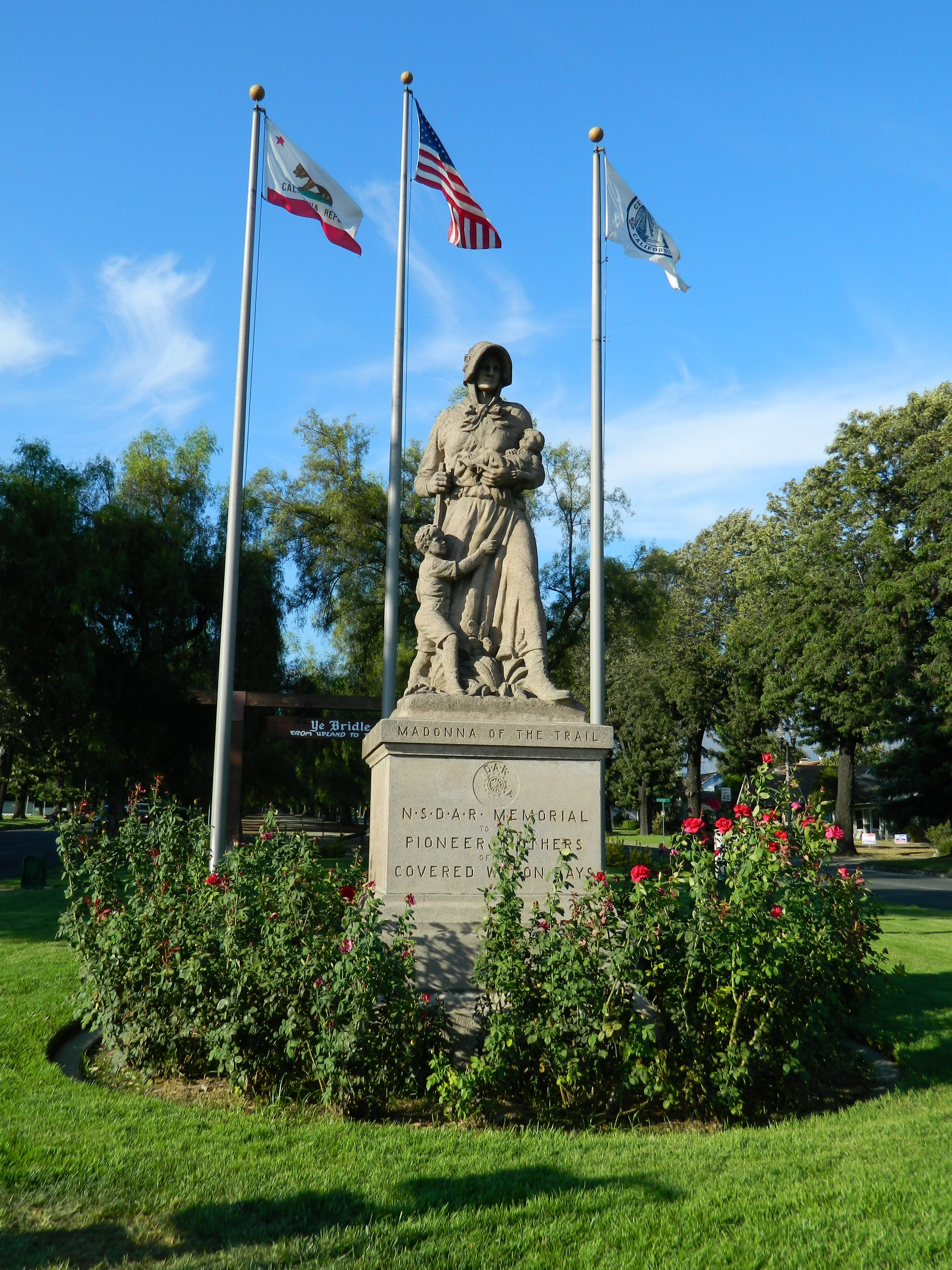
Madonna of the Trail statue in Upland

=== Madonna of the Trail ===
In 1929, the Daughters of the American Revolution placed a Madonna of the Trail statue in Upland at the intersection of Foothill Boulevard and Euclid Avenue. The twelve Madonna of the Trail statues, created by sculptor August Leimbach, mark the route of the National Old Trails road with the westernmost statue being that in Upland. One of the inscriptions on the base of the Madonna of the Trail statue notes that, in 1826, Jedediah Smith passed through what later became Upland, leading a band of 16 trappers in an expedition that marked the first American entry into California over land.

=== Historic Route 66 ===
While Route 66 was disestablished in 1985, remnants of the classic highway can still be seen today on Foothill Boulevard in Upland, including a "classic" McDonald's with the original golden arches and the vintage Buffalo Inn, where buffalo burgers have been served since 1929.

=== Euclid Avenue ===
Euclid Avenue was added to the National Register of Historic Places in 2005. The 3-mile (4.8 km) Bridle Path runs down the center of Euclid Avenue from Foothill Boulevard to 24th Street. The Bridle Path is also used for walking and jogging.

=== Historic Downtown Upland ===
The oldest part of Upland is east of Euclid between 8th Street and Arrow Highway, and was originally known as "Old Magnolia". Historic Downtown Upland, is a group of downtown merchants who work together to promote and enhance the historic business district. Downtown is made up of nearly 200 businesses providing a diversity of merchandise, restaurants, breweries and services. The Upland Farmers Market is held in downtown Upland every Saturday from April through October.

== Government ==
In the California State Senate, Upland is split between the 25th senatorial district, represented by Democrat Sasha Renée Pérez, and the 29th senatorial district, represented by Democrat Eloise Reyes.

In the California State Assembly, Upland is split between the 41st Assembly district, represented by Democrat John Harabedian, and the 53rd Assembly district, represented by Democrat Michelle Rodriguez.

In the United States House of Representatives, the northern part of Upland is in California's 28th congressional district, represented by Democrat Judy Chu. The southern part of Upland is in California's 35th congressional district, represented by Democrat Norma Torres. The dividing line between the two districts mainly follows 14th Street.

== Transportation ==
Upland is home to Cable Airport, the world's largest family-owned, public use, general aviation airport. Nearby Ontario International Airport and more distant Los Angeles International Airport offer commercial flights.

Upland is served by the Metrolink commuter rail system on the San Bernardino Line. Metrolink's San Bernardino Line runs from Los Angeles Union Station to San Bernardino. The line was built in 1887 by the Atchison, Topeka and Santa Fe Railway. AT&SF ceased passenger operations in the late 1960s, but Metrolink acquired the railroad tracks in 1992 and resumed passenger transportation. The Upland Metrolink Station is located at the site of the AT&SF station built in 1937. The 1937 station house is currently used by a retail store, but the rail platform is used for Metrolink operations. The Burlington Northern Santa Fe Railway continues to operate rail freight on the line.

Euclid Avenue is part of California Highway 83, a north–south route that connects to Ontario and Chino to the south. Foothill Boulevard is part of California Highway 66, an east–west route that was formerly part of U.S. Route 66.

Bus service in Upland is provided by Omnitrans.

Interstate 10 runs along Upland's boundary with Ontario, and connects Upland with Los Angeles to the west and San Bernardino the east. The east–west running State Route 210 (future Interstate 210) runs through the northern part of Upland, connecting to Pasadena to the west and San Bernardino to the east.

== Education ==
=== Public ===
Upland is served by the Upland Unified School District. Part of Upland falls within the Chaffey Joint Union High School District, but none of the CJUHSD schools are located in Upland.

==== Secondary schools ====
- Upland High School
- Hillside High School (Continuation)

==== Middle schools ====
- Pioneer Junior High School
- Upland Junior High School

==== Elementary schools ====
- Baldy View Elementary School
- Cabrillo Elementary School
- Citrus Elementary School
- Foothill Knolls Elementary School
- Magnolia Elementary School
- Pepper Tree Elementary School
- Sierra Vista Elementary School
- Sycamore Elementary School
- Upland Elementary School
- Valencia Elementary School

=== Private ===
- Carden Arbor View School (K–8)
- Saint Mark's Episcopal School (K–8)
- Upland Christian Academy (K–12)
- Western Christian Schools (PreK–12, multiple campuses)
- St. Joseph Catholic School (K–8)

== Notable people ==
=== Born here ===
- Ricky Adams, Major League Baseball infielder
- Aidan Apodaca, soccer player
- Kevin Ara, soccer player
- Jake Barrett, Major League Baseball pitcher
- Michael Bhatia, social scientist
- Carlos Bocanegra, soccer player
- Alexa Cappelli, singer
- Chukwudi Chijindu, soccer player
- LaVar Christensen, Utah politician
- McKay Christensen, Major League Baseball player
- Melinda Clarke, actress
- Danielle Chuchran, actress
- Chad Cordero, Major League Baseball pitcher
- Lindsay Davis, figure skater
- Brian Dunseth, retired professional soccer player
- Aundrea Fimbres, singer and dancer
- Nikkie Groat, beauty queen contestant
- Big B, rapper
- Jeff Kostoff, Olympic swimmer
- Eddie Lawson, motorcycle racer
- Cory Lekkerkerker, professional football player
- Litefoot, Native American rapper and actor
- Sydnee Michaels, LPGA Tour golfer
- Chad Moeller, Major League Baseball player
- Tiffany Mynx, pornographic actress and film director
- Daniel Robertson, Major League Baseball infielder
- Roger Rueff, playwright
- Joe Ruttman, race-car driver
- Alexis Serna, Canadian Football League player
- Sean Tracey, Major League Baseball pitcher
- Jason Wright, American businessman and football executive

=== Other residents ===
- Robert Horace Baker, astronomer, died in Upland
- Franklin Bruno, musician
- Bill Cobbs, actor
- Alberto Dávila, boxer in World Boxing Hall of Fame; resident of Upland
- Craig Dietrich, academic and creator of cultural software
- Roger Fan, actor
- Rollie Fingers, relief pitcher in Baseball Hall of Fame; attended Upland High School
- Red Grammer, musician, Bebop Your Best (2005) Grammy Nominated
- Tom Jankiewicz, screenwriter of Grosse Pointe Blank
- Sandra Lee, American dermatologist
- Corey Miller, tattoo artist and TV personality
- Cody Ponce, Major League Baseball pitcher
- Peter Popoff, televangelist
- Steve Scott, cross-country runner
- Ivan Shaw, actor
- Edward Ulloa, attorney and former criminal prosecutor
- Nedra Volz, actress
- Winds of Plague, deathcore/symphonic metal band
- Sol Ruca, WWE NXT Professional Wrestler

== Sister cities ==
Upland has two sister cities, as designated by Sister Cities International:

- Mildura, Victoria, Australia, which, like Upland, was established as an irrigation community by George and William Chaffey
- Caborca, Sonora, Mexico

== In popular culture ==
Upland is mentioned in the 2008 Keanu Reeves film Street Kings as the home of LAPD Internal Affairs Captain James Biggs (played by Hugh Laurie).

The city is also notable as the location of the TLC TV series Dr. Pimple Popper. The series is a spin-off of the YouTube channel of dermatologist Sandra Lee, who became a major Internet celebrity after posting videos of her procedures. The primary location for both the TV series and YouTube videos is Skin Physicians & Surgeons, a clinic operated by Lee and her dermatologist husband Jeffrey Rebish.

Peter Popoff's People United for Christ is based in Upland.

== See also ==
- 1990 Upland earthquake
- Upland News, weekly and semiweekly newspaper
