= Upland High School =

Public secondary school in Upland, California, United States

Coordinates: 34°06′16″N 117°39′31″W

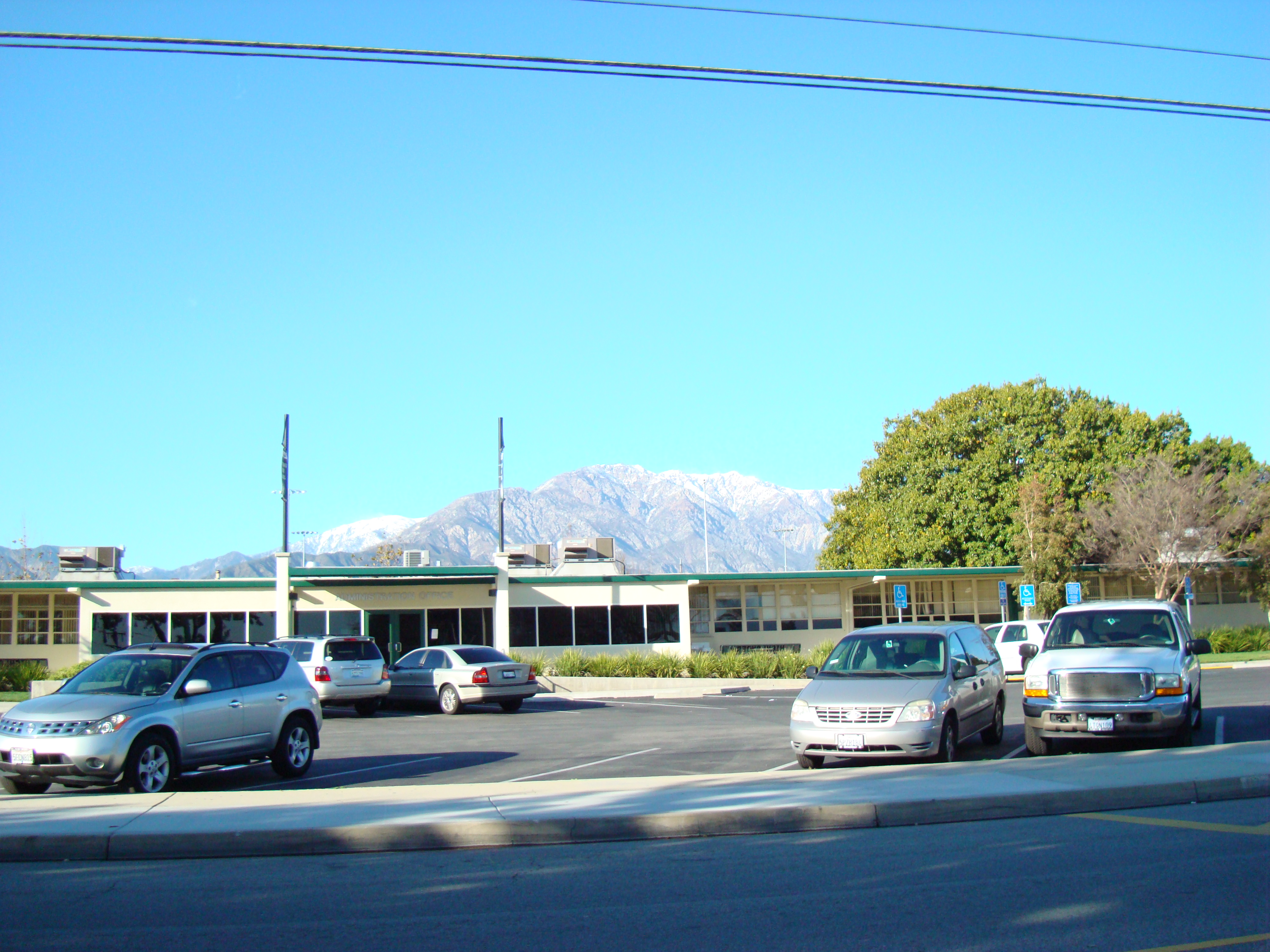
- Administration building

Location
- 565 W. 11th Street; Upland, California 91786; United States

Information
- Type: Public Secondary
- Motto: "Home of the Highlanders"
- Established: 1955
- Oversight: Upland Unified School District
- Principal: Dr. Martin O. Gomez
- Teaching staff: 125.09 (FTE)
- Grades: 9–12
- Enrollment: 2,797 (2024-2025)
- Student to teacher ratio: 22.36
- Color
- Mascot: Highlander, Scottish Terrier
- Newspaper: "The Plaid"
- Yearbook: Hielan
- Website: Upland High School website
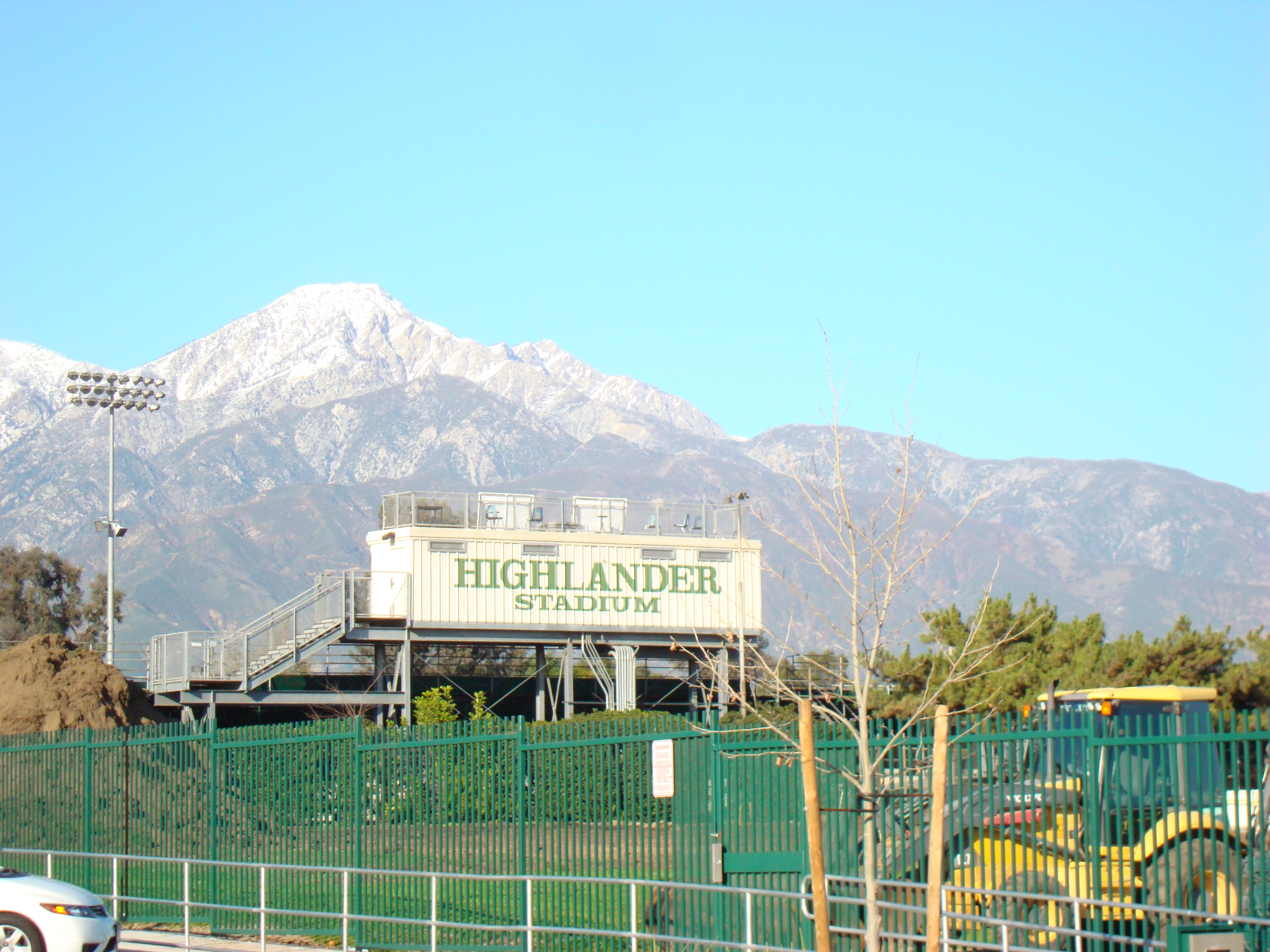
- Highlander Stadium

Upland High School is a four-year public high school located in the city of Upland, California. The school was established in 1955 as part of the Chaffey Joint Union High School District, and since 1988 it has been a member of the Upland Unified School District. It currently serves students from Upland and the northern portions of Ontario and Montclair that are North of the San Bernardino Freeway.

== History ==
Just prior to the City of Upland's growth spurt in the 1960s, Upland High School was established in 1955. By the 1980s this population growth had the side-effect of overcrowding, which in turn caused students to transfer to other high schools in the Chaffey Joint Union High School District. The affected families then began a movement towards unifying Upland High School with the existing elementary and middle schools of the Upland School District. Superintendent George Renworth promoted this movement and the Upland Unified School District was established in 1986. Upland High School has been a part of the district since it left the Chaffey Joint Union High School District in 1988. The school offers many classes, electives, and sports. Auto, Graphic Arts, Art, Photo, Cooking, Choir, Marching Band, Colorguard and Ceramics are just a fraction of the extra classes available. For more advanced students, the school offers a wide variety of Advanced Placement and honors courses. In addition, there are many sports available to the students, including Volleyball, Football, Baseball, Softball, Basketball, Tennis, Water Polo, Cheerleading, Wrestling, Track & Field, Cross Country, Soccer, and Swimming. The main quad area has been renovated, along with the football field and pool to offer a better environment at Upland High School. A bond passed by the community has allowed for "Twenty-First Century Classrooms," a series of renovations which include skylights, smart boards, and class sets of laptops.

== Upland Marching Arts ==
Upland High School's marching band, known as the Upland Highland Regiment, is one of the most successful marching band programs in California. With a consistent year-to-year size of over 220 students, the regiment competes in the highest-level divisions of local competitive marching band circuits. The regiment has received numerous first place and sweepstakes awards in Bands Of America, Western Band Association, and SCSBOA events and field tournaments.

The regiment has been a finalist every year it has competed in WBA Regional Championships, from 2004 through 2012, with several medaling seasons. In 2006, the regiment took part in the prestigious Bands of America Grand National Championships, where they placed among the top 20 bands in the nation. On January 1, 2011, the regiment marched in the 2011 Tournament of Roses Parade. This was the band's second appearance in the parade. That same fall, the band was named 2011 Utah Bands of America regional champion. On November 23–24, 2013, the regiment competed in the Western Band Association championships, where they won first place for the first time in regiment history. In November 2014, the regiment again traveled to the Bands of America Grand National Championship at Lucas Oil Stadium in Indianapolis, Ind. They placed 26th.

Other marching arts programs at Upland High School include a winter percussion program and winter guard program. During the spring semester, the regiment's percussion program participates in several SCPA and WGI competitions. The colorguard takes part in WGI, where it has placed among the top eight scholastic open guards in the nation, and WGASC, where it is the defending scholastic open champion for the past two years.

== Dress Code ==
Upland High School has a dress code that is directly in sync with its core values and principles: "Character, Citizenship, Creativity, Critical Thinking, Collaboration, and Communication". The school sets a standard and expects every student to follow these standards. They include:

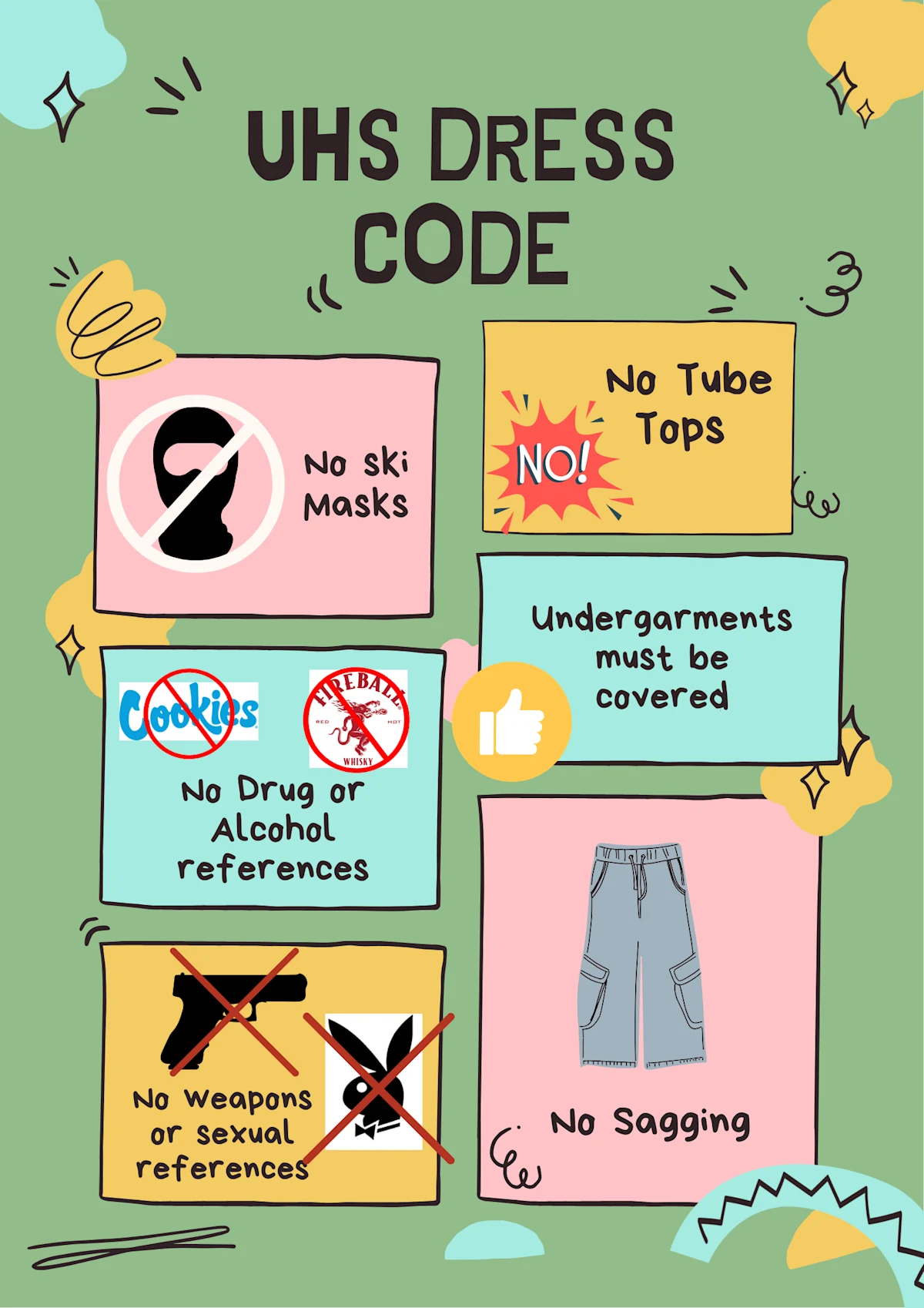

- No Ski masks.
- No tube tops.
- Undergarments must be covered.
- No drugs or alcohol references (e.g, logos or images related to brands like Cookies or Life Savers).
- No weapons or sexual references (Images like the Playboy bunny logo).
- No sagging.

== Notable alumni ==
- Jimmy Alapag, professional basketball player for PBA on Talk N Text and FIBA Philippines
- Lauren Barnes, professional soccer player
- Jeff Bennetzen, professor of genetics at University of Georgia, member US National Academy of Sciences
- Taylor Boggs, football player
- Tyron Brackenridge, football player with Jacksonville Jaguars
- Dave Coggin, retired Major League Baseball pitcher (2000-2002)
- Chad Davidson, poet, translator and Associate Professor of English at University of West Georgia
- Aundrea Fimbres, former member of P. Diddy's Making the Band group Danity Kane
- Rollie Fingers, baseball player with Oakland Athletics, member of Baseball Hall of Fame
- Justin Flowe, football player
- Hessley Hempstead, football player
- Thomas Hobson, actor
- Orlando Huff, football player formerly with Atlanta Falcons and Fresno State
- Matthew Kim (BM), Korean-American rapper and member of K-Pop group, KARD
- Elijah Klein, football player with the Tampa Bay Buccaneers
- Jeff Kostoff, Olympic swimmer
- Kenny Lawler, professional football wide receiver
- Tianzhen Li, MMA fighter
- Jeff Liefer, Major League Baseball player
- John Long, rock climber and author
- Owen Macklam, multi-time HSPDP Champion
- Chad Moeller, Major League Baseball catcher for Colorado Rockies organization
- R. Stevie Moore, singer, songwriter, and musician
- Josh Nunes, college football player with Stanford Cardinal
- Dan Robertson, professional baseball player with Cleveland Indians
- Eli Scott, basketball player
- Steve Scott, middle distance runner
- Ivan Shaw, Taiwanese-American actor
- Kirk Snyder, basketball player with Minnesota Timberwolves
- Michael Steger, television actor
- Sean Tracey, baseball player with Chicago White Sox
- James Tuthill, football player
- Edward Ulloa, attorney and former criminal prosecutor
- Josh Woods, football player
