= Arline B. Nichols Moss =

American schoolteacher and Daughters of the American Revolution member

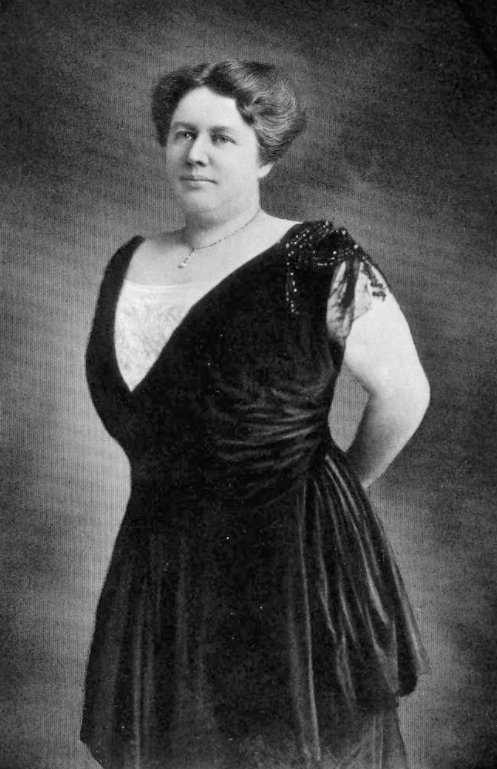
- Moss, c. 1921
- Born: Arline Belle Nichols; December 24, 1876; St. Louis, Missouri, U.S.
- Died: December 26, 1945 (aged 69); St. Louis, Missouri, U.S.
- Resting place: Bellefontaine Cemetery, St. Louis
- Occupation: Schoolteacher
- Spouse: John Trigg Moss (m. 1901)

Arline Belle Nichols Moss (1876–1945) of St. Louis, Missouri, was the chairwoman of the committee of the Daughters of the American Revolution who conceptually conceived the Madonna of the Trail monuments.

== Biography ==
Arline Belle Nichols was born in St. Louis on December 24, 1876. She taught at the St. Louis Day School for the Deaf for six years, before moving to her own private teaching studio.

She married John Trigg Moss in June 1901, and they had two children.

Mrs. Moss visualized a statue similar to one she had seen in Oregon of Sacagawea, the Shoshone woman who guided Lewis and Clark on their search for a water route to the Pacific Ocean. She sought out sculptor August Leimbach to create the monuments.

The Madonna of the Trail monuments were dedicated in 12 states in 1928 and 1929.

Moss died at her home in St. Louis on December 26, 1945, and was buried at Bellefontaine Cemetery.
