= James Tuthill =

American football player (born 1976)

No. 14, 17
- Position: Placekicker

Personal information
- Born: March 25, 1976 (age 50); Upland, California, U.S.
- Listed height: 6 ft 2 in (1.88 m)
- Listed weight: 250 lb (113 kg)

Career information
- High school: Upland
- College: Cal Poly
- NFL draft: 2000: undrafted

Career history
- San Francisco 49ers (2000)*; Green Bay Packers (2001)*; Jacksonville Jaguars (2002)*; San Diego Chargers (2002); Washington Redskins (2002)
- * Offseason or practice squad member only
- Stats at Pro Football Reference

James Joseph Tuthill (born March 25, 1976) is an American former professional football player who was a placekicker in the National Football League (NFL) for the San Diego Chargers and the Washington Redskins. He played college football for the Cal Poly Mustangs.

== Early life ==
After graduating from Upland High, Tuthill went on to placekick and punt at California Polytechnic State University, San Luis Obispo, earning second-team All American West Conference selection as a senior with the Mustangs.

Collegiate Statistics
	FG Made	FG Attempts	LG	Punts	Punt Avg.	LG
1994	6	14	48	5	35.4	41
1995	14	24	48	48	36.0	54
Career	20	38	48	53	n/a	54

== Professional football ==
Tuthill signed with Washington on September 10, 2002.

NFL Statistics
Year	Team	GP	FGM	FGA	LG	PAT (Att.)	KO	TB
2002 / Career	WAS	11	10	16	53	20 (21)	43	3
