= San Antonio Heights, California =

San Antonio Heights
- census-designated place
- Location in San Bernardino County and the state of California

- Location in the United States
- Coordinates: 34°09′20″N 117°39′23″W
- Country: United States
- State: California
- County: San Bernardino

Area
  - Total: 2.607 sq mi (6.752 km^{2})
  - Land: 2.446 sq mi (6.335 km^{2})
  - Water: 0.161 sq mi (0.417 km^{2}) 6.18%
- Elevation: 2,103 ft (641 m)

Population (2020)
  - Total: 3,441
  - Density: 1,407/sq mi (543.2/km^{2})
- Time zone: UTC-8 (PST)
  - Summer (DST): UTC-7 (PDT)
- ZIP code: 91784
- Area code: 909
- FIPS code: 06-64462
- GNIS feature IDs: 1661373, 2409248

San Antonio Heights is a census-designated place (CDP) in the Inland Empire region of San Bernardino County, California. It is in the northern Pomona Valley and the foothills of the San Gabriel Mountains. The population was 3,441 at the 2020 census, up from 3,371 at the 2010 census.

== Geography ==
San Antonio Heights is an area located at 34°9′11″N 117°39′41″W (34.153008, -117.661433). The area is north of the city of Upland.

According to the United States Census Bureau, the CDP has a total area of 2.6 square miles (6.7 km^{2}). 2.5 square miles (6.5 km^{2}) of it is land and 0.2 square miles (0.52 km^{2}) of it (6.18%) is water.

=== Climate ===
This region experiences hot, dry summers and mild, rainy winters, receiving more rainfall than most areas in Metro Los Angeles due to being situated in the upslope foothill regions and experiencing orographic effects which increase precipitation. According to the Köppen Climate Classification system, San Antonio Heights has a hot-summer Mediterranean climate, abbreviated "Csa" on climate maps.

Climate data for San Antonio Canyon, California (1917-1967 averages)
Month	Jan	Feb	Mar	Apr	May	Jun	Jul	Aug	Sep	Oct	Nov	Dec	Year
Mean daily maximum °F (°C)	61.9 (16.6)	63.8 (17.7)	66.4 (19.1)	70.7 (21.5)	75.0 (23.9)	82.0 (27.8)	91.6 (33.1)	91.6 (33.1)	88.8 (31.6)	79.9 (26.6)	71.2 (21.8)	65.1 (18.4)	75.7 (24.3)
Mean daily minimum °F (°C)	41.7 (5.4)	42.2 (5.7)	43.1 (6.2)	46.1 (7.8)	49.0 (9.4)	53.5 (11.9)	61.3 (16.3)	61.8 (16.6)	60.8 (16.0)	54.8 (12.7)	48.5 (9.2)	44.7 (7.1)	50.6 (10.4)
Average precipitation inches (mm)	4.36 (111)	4.52 (115)	4.00 (102)	2.76 (70)	0.77 (20)	0.11 (2.8)	0.03 (0.76)	0.07 (1.8)	0.45 (11)	1.07 (27)	2.59 (66)	4.35 (110)	25.08 (637.36)
Average snowfall inches (cm)	0.7 (1.8)	0.0 (0.0)	0.0 (0.0)	0.0 (0.0)	0.0 (0.0)	0.0 (0.0)	0.0 (0.0)	0.0 (0.0)	0.0 (0.0)	0.0 (0.0)	0.0 (0.0)	0.1 (0.25)	0.8 (2.05)

== Demographics ==
Historical population
Census	Pop.	Note	%±
1990	2,935		—
2000	3,122		6.4%
2010	3,371		8.0%
2020	3,441		2.1%
U.S. Decennial Census; 1850–1870 1880-1890; 1900 1910 1920; 1930 1940 1950; 1960 1970 1980; 1990 2000 2010

San Antonio Heights was first listed as a census designated place in the 1990 U.S. census.

=== 2020 census ===
As of the 2020 census, San Antonio Heights had a population of 3,441. The population density was 1,406.8 inhabitants per square mile (543.2/km^{2}). The age distribution was 17.4% under the age of 18, 7.0% aged 18 to 24, 20.2% aged 25 to 44, 31.6% aged 45 to 64, and 23.8% who were 65 years of age or older. The median age was 49.2 years. For every 100 females, there were 99.4 males, and for every 100 females age 18 and over there were 96.1 males.

99.4% of residents lived in urban areas, while 0.6% lived in rural areas.

Racial composition as of the 2020 census
Race	Number	Percent
White	2,195	63.8%
Black or African American	75	2.2%
American Indian and Alaska Native	28	0.8%
Asian	342	9.9%
Native Hawaiian and Other Pacific Islander	4	0.1%
Some other race	313	9.1%
Two or more races	484	14.1%
Hispanic or Latino (of any race)	858	24.9%

The census reported that 98.5% of the population lived in households, 1.3% lived in non-institutionalized group quarters, and 0.2% were institutionalized.

There were 1,222 households, out of which 27.9% included children under the age of 18, 60.2% were married-couple households, 3.9% were cohabiting couple households, 21.7% had a female householder with no partner present, and 14.2% had a male householder with no partner present. 18.8% of households were one person, and 11.0% were one person aged 65 or older. The average household size was 2.77. There were 944 families (77.3% of all households).

There were 1,268 housing units at an average density of 518.4 units per square mile (200.2 units/km^{2}), of which 1,222 (96.4%) were occupied. Of these, 84.1% were owner-occupied, and 15.9% were occupied by renters. Of all housing units, 3.6% were vacant; the homeowner vacancy rate was 0.8% and the rental vacancy rate was 0.5%.

=== Income and poverty ===
In 2023, the US Census Bureau estimated that the median household income was $144,509, and the per capita income was $67,234. About 5.5% of families and 7.0% of the population were below the poverty line.

=== 2010 census ===
The 2010 United States census reported that San Antonio Heights had a population of 3,371. The population density was 1,287.6 inhabitants per square mile (497.1/km^{2}). The racial makeup of San Antonio Heights was 2,765 (82.0%) White (69.3% Non-Hispanic White), 67 (2.0%) African American, 24 (0.7%) Native American, 284 (8.4%) Asian, 15 (0.4%) Pacific Islander, 115 (3.4%) from other races, and 101 (3.0%) from two or more races. Hispanic or Latino of any race were 612 persons (18.2%).

The Census reported that 3,358 people (99.6% of the population) lived in households, 13 (0.4%) lived in non-institutionalized group quarters, and 0 (0%) were institutionalized.

There were 1,198 households, out of which 390 (32.6%) had children under the age of 18 living in them, 786 (65.6%) were opposite-sex married couples living together, 94 (7.8%) had a female householder with no husband present, 75 (6.3%) had a male householder with no wife present. There were 53 (4.4%) unmarried opposite-sex partnerships, and 17 (1.4%) same-sex married couples or partnerships. 175 households (14.6%) were made up of individuals, and 88 (7.3%) had someone living alone who was 65 years of age or older. The average household size was 2.80. There were 955 families (79.7% of all households); the average family size was 3.08.

The population was spread out, with 700 people (20.8%) under the age of 18, 281 people (8.3%) aged 18 to 24, 639 people (19.0%) aged 25 to 44, 1,182 people (35.1%) aged 45 to 64, and 569 people (16.9%) who were 65 years of age or older. The median age was 46.3 years. For every 100 females, there were 101.1 males. For every 100 females age 18 and over, there were 102.2 males.

There were 1,239 housing units at an average density of 473.3 per square mile (182.7/km^{2}), of which 1,004 (83.8%) were owner-occupied, and 194 (16.2%) were occupied by renters. The homeowner vacancy rate was 0.8%; the rental vacancy rate was 5.4%. 2,851 people (84.6% of the population) lived in owner-occupied housing units and 507 people (15.0%) lived in rental housing units.

According to the 2010 United States Census, San Antonio Heights had a median household income of $106,905, with 2.9% of the population living below the federal poverty line.

== Government ==
In the California State Legislature, San Antonio Heights is in the 25th senatorial district, represented by Democrat Sasha Renée Pérez, and in the 41st Assembly district, represented by Democrat John Harabedian.

In the United States House of Representatives, San Antonio Heights is in California's 28th congressional district, represented by Democrat Judy Chu.

== Education ==
It is in the Upland Unified School District.
