= August Leimbach =

German-American artist 1882–1965

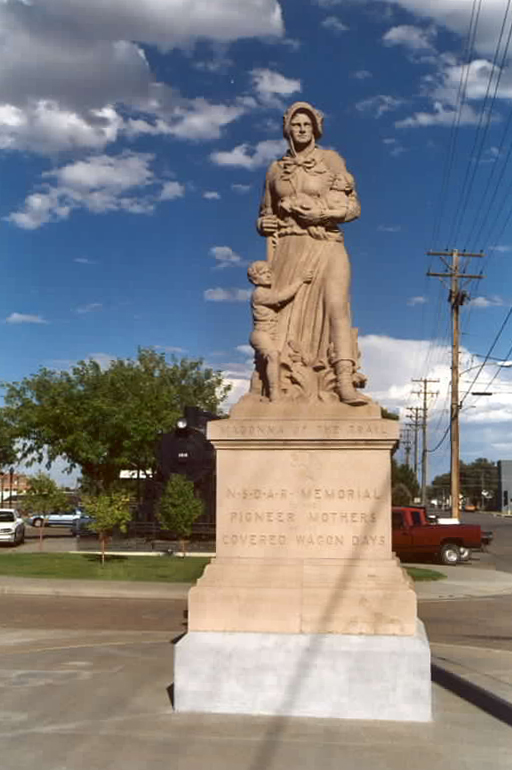
Madonna of the Trail, Lamar, Colorado

August Leimbach (February 12, 1882 – December 18, 1965) was a German-American sculptor. A native of Elberfeld, he studied art and sculpture, and after immigrating to the United States in 1910, he quickly settled in the St.Louis area and worked passionately as an architectural sculptor.

August Leimbach provided much decorative architectural sculpture for the Panama–Pacific International Exposition, San Francisco, but is best remembered for his work with Arlene B. Nichols Moss and the Daughters of the American Revolution in the creation of the Madonna of the Trail monument in 1927. The material, a cast composite stone called "Aldonite" was selected before the sculptor was chosen and the design approved. Twelve monuments were cast and placed in twelve designated cities across the United States, marking the National Old Trails Highway from Bethesda, Maryland to Upland, California. The sculpture itself are representative of the strength, courage, and role of the pioneer woman in establishing the early western territories. Each monument were dedicated in their respective state in 1928 and 1929.

Leimbach died at age 83 and is buried next to his wife Frieda in Michelstadt, Germany.
