= Hillside High School (California) =

Coordinates: 34°05′45″N 117°40′48″W

- 1558 West 9th Street, Upland, California 91786

Information
- Type: Public secondary
- Principal: Jerry Adams
- Teaching staff: 11.18 (FTE)
- Enrollment: 129 (2023-2024)
- Student to teacher ratio: 11.54
- Nickname: Hawks
- Website: Hillside High School

Hillside High School is a public secondary school in Upland, California. It is one of two high schools in the Upland Unified School District. Hillside is a continuation school and enrolls 257 students from grades 10 through 12. Students must be at least 16 years of age to attend Hillside. Hillside also contains Upland Unified School District's teen parent program and has an onsite day care center for student's children, nicknamed the "Hawksnest."
