= Upland Unified School District =

School district in California, United States

Address
- 390 North Euclid Avenue San Bernardino County Upland, California; United States

District information
- Type: Public
- Grades: K through 12
- NCES District ID: 0600016

Students and staff
- Students: 10,228 (2020–2021)
- Teachers: 442.91 (FTE)
- Staff: 495.22 (FTE) r
- Student–teacher ratio: 23.09:1

Other information
- Website: www.upland.k12.ca.us

Upland Unified School District is a school district located in San Bernardino County, California that serves the community of Upland, California. It has a total population of approximately 63,800 and covers a total area of 24 square miles.

In addition to Upland, the district includes the San Antonio Heights census-designated place.

== History ==
Just prior to the City of Upland's growth spurt in the 1960s, Upland High School was established in 1955. By the 1980s this population growth had the side-effect of overcrowding, which in turn caused students to transfer to other high schools in the Chaffey Joint Union High School District. The affected families then began a movement towards unifying the existing elementary and middle schools into a separate district. Superintendent George Renworth promoted this movement and the Upland Unified School District was established in 1986. Upland High School has been a part of the district since it left the Chaffey Joint Union High School District in 1988.

== Schools ==
The Upland Unified School District is a K-12 district. It has ten elementary schools, two junior high schools, and two high schools. One of the high schools is a continuation school. The district enrolled approximately 11,200 students in the 2007–2008 school year. All of the schools are located in Upland, California.

=== Elementary schools ===
- Baldy View Elementary School
- Cabrillo Elementary School
- Citrus Elementary School
- Foothill Knolls Stem Academy of Innovation
- Magnolia Elementary School
- Pepper Tree Elementary School
- Sierra Vista Elementary School
- Sycamore Elementary School
- Upland Elementary School
- Valencia Elementary School

=== Junior high schools ===
- Pioneer Junior High School
- Upland Junior High School
- Foothill Knolls Stem Academy of Innovation

=== High schools ===
- Upland High School

=== Continuation high schools ===
- Hillside High School
