= Sean Tracey =

American baseball pitcher (born 1980)

- Pitcher
- Born: November 14, 1980 (age 45); Upland, California, U.S.
- Batted: Left Threw: Right

MLB debut
- June 8, 2006, for the Chicago White Sox

Last MLB appearance
- September 26, 2006, for the Chicago White Sox

MLB statistics
- Win–loss record: 0–0
- Earned run average: 3.38
- Strikeouts: 3
- Stats at Baseball Reference

Teams
- Chicago White Sox (2006)

Sean Patrick Tracey (born November 14, 1980) is an American former professional baseball right-handed pitcher. He appeared in seven games with the Chicago White Sox in 2006, all as a relief pitcher.

== College career ==
Tracey played both football and baseball in his first year at Citrus College in Glendora, California. In baseball, he earned All-American honors his second baseball season at Citrus.

== Professional career ==
Tracey was selected by Chicago White Sox in the 8th round (240th overall) of 2002 Major League Baseball draft. He made his professional debut that season in rookie ball with the Bristol White Sox of the Appalachian League. Over the next four seasons, he worked his way up through the White Sox organization, reaching triple-A in 2006 with the Charlotte Knights.

Tracey made his Major League Baseball debut with the White Sox on June 8, 2006, against the Detroit Tigers at U.S. Cellular Field in Chicago. In his debut, Tracey pitched two innings and surrendered 1 hit and no runs while striking out two. He appeared in seven games for Chicago, all in relief. Tracey was involved in a controversial situation on June 14, 2006. With the White Sox down by 8 runs, manager Ozzie Guillén brought in Tracey to face Texas Rangers third baseman Hank Blalock in retaliation for White Sox catcher A. J. Pierzynski being hit by pitches in his first two at-bats, the second of which was an off-speed pitch. After attempting to hit Blalock and missing, Guillen removed Tracey from the game, despite Tracey retiring Blalock. Guillen verbally berated Tracey in the dugout. After the game Guillen told his side of the story to the media about his actions during the game. Tracey responded to the media with "No comment" and was demoted to the White Sox Triple-A affiliate, the Charlotte Knights, the next day because the White Sox had already acquired another pitcher in an unrelated trade, however the new acquisition was represented by his same sports management group.

Tracey signed with the Laredo Lemurs of the American Association of Independent Professional Baseball for the 2013 season. He played with the club in the 2014 and 2015 seasons as well.
