= Edward Ulloa =

American lawyer

Edward Ulloa (born August 18, 1962) is an American attorney and former criminal prosecutor who received notoriety as the prosecutor for some of the first internet child sexual predator cases in California. Ulloa also drafted AB 2661 in 2000 that sought to enhance sentencing guidelines for the possession and dissemination of child pornography.

== Early life ==
Ulloa was born on August 18, 1962, in Pomona, California. He attended Upland High School, and graduated from Mt. San Antonio College in Walnut, California and California State University, Long Beach, where he received a degree in Theatre. He received his Juris Doctor degree from Pepperdine University in 1995, and was admitted to the bar on November 22, 1995.

== Prosecutor ==
Ulloa served as a Deputy District Attorney in the Felony Sexual Assault Unit for Ventura County, California, between 1995 and 1999, and for Orange County between 1999 and 2000. He is currently a partner in the Los Angeles office of Morgan, Lewis & Bockius, LLP, where his practice involves defending corporations in products liability actions. He has received a rating of "AV Preeminent" by Martindale-Hubbell. Ulloa has been selected as a Top Rated Products Liability Attorney in Los Angeles by Super Lawyers Magazine. In 2025, Ulloa was also named in "Best Lawyers in America" Magazine in the field of "Products Liability - Defendants".

In 1998, Ulloa was the prosecutor in one of the first cases in Ventura County involving an attempt by a criminal defendant to procure sex with a child using the internet. In that case, a 37-year-old married publishing company employee was charged with agreeing to pay $350 to perform various sexual acts with a fictitious 13-year-old girl he met in a Yahoo! chat room and distributing child pornography. The fictitious child was actually a San Bernardino County sheriff's deputy. The defendant in that action, David Paris Hensley was sentenced to serve four years for pandering for purposes of child prostitution and attempted child molestation. Ulloa also was the prosecutor in a case involving a habitual sex offender infected with HIV being sentenced to 165 years to life in prison for repeatedly molesting a teenager he picked up at an adult video store.

== Personal life ==
Ulloa is married to Tatum Cook, and they have four children.
