= Madonna of the Trail =

American monuments to pioneer women

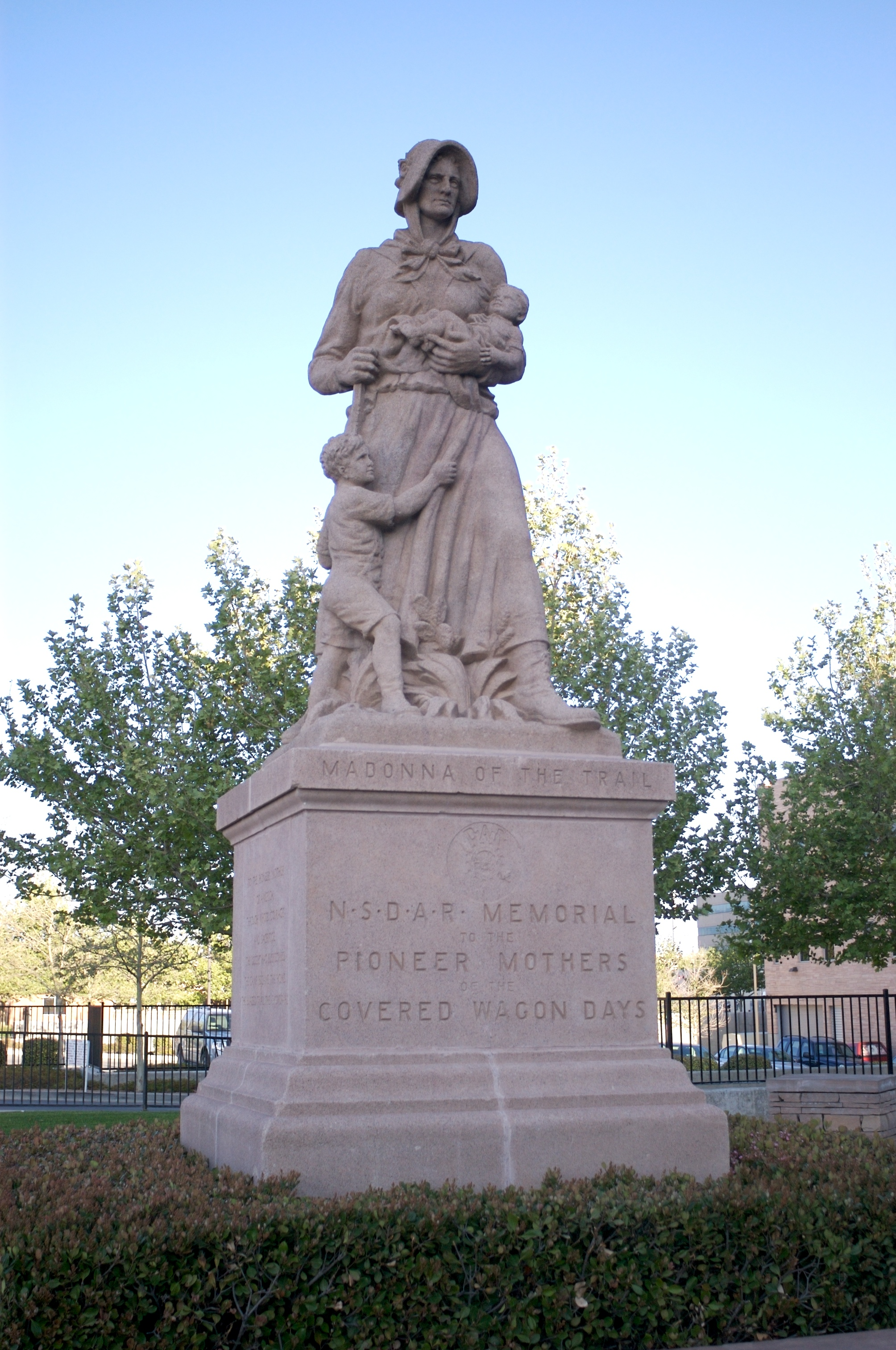
- Albuquerque Madonna
- Interactive map of Madonna of the Trail

History
- Built: September 27, 1928

Site notes
- Architect: August Leimbach

U.S. National Register of Historic Places
- Designated: March 21, 2006

Madonna of the Trail California Historical Monument
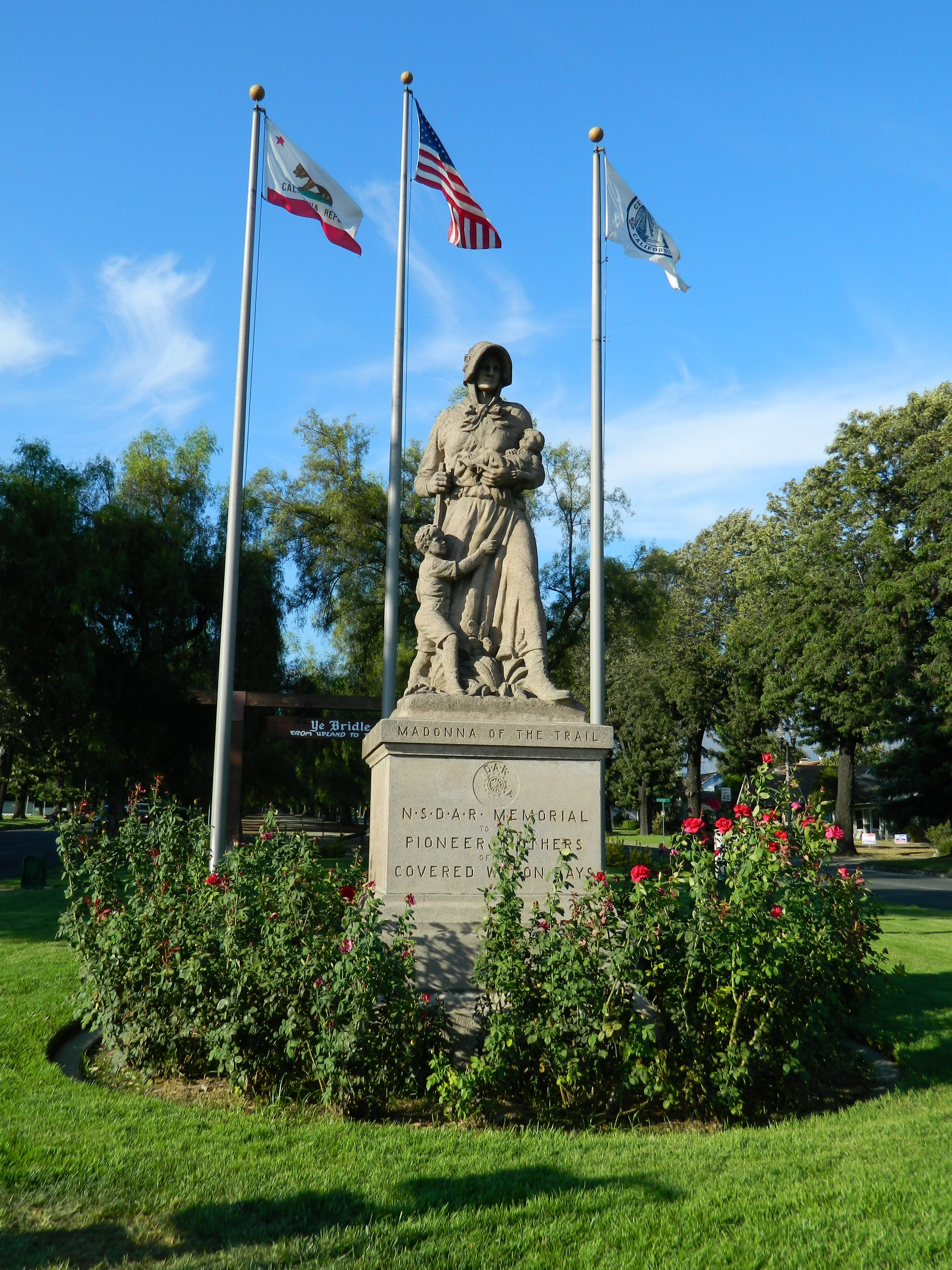
- Madonna of the Trail, 1928

- Location within California
- 34°06′26″N 117°39′04″W
- Location: North Euclid Avenue, Upland, California

History
- Built: 1929

Site notes
- Architect: August Leimbach

California Historical Landmark
- Designated: November 7, 1998
- Reference no.: 1028

Madonna of the Trail is a series of 12 identical monuments to the spirit of pioneer women in the United States. The monuments were commissioned in the late 1920s by the Daughters of the American Revolution (NSDAR) under president Grace Lincoln Hall Brosseau. They were installed in the 12 states along the National Old Trails Road, which extended from Cumberland, Maryland, to Upland, California.

In 1911, the NSDAR established a committee to honor pioneer women. An initial plan for painted mileage markers along the route was abandoned in favor of pioneer mother statues. Arlene Nichols Moss, NSDAR commission chairperson, was inspired by Portland, Oregon’s 1905 "Sacajawea" monument. The NSDAR commissioned sculptor August Leimbach to create the statues. The image is now owned by Kevin Karl, Leimbach's great-grandson. Each statue is 10 feet high, weighs 5 tons and is made of Missouri granite. The National Old Trails Road Association (NOTR) was created to study the trails and select routes to designate. Judge (and later U.S. President) Harry S. Truman led the NOTR and spoke at the first monument dedication in 1928.

The Madonna of the Trail monuments were intended to commemorate the courage and faith of the women who helped conquer the wilderness and establish permanent homes. Through the continuing efforts of local and national groups, all are currently in good condition and on display.

== History ==
Some Madonna of the Trail monuments have become community landmarks.

On June 2, 2020, the Upland, California Madonna of the Trail monument was the site of a Black Lives Matter protest in the wake of the murder of George Floyd.

== Locations ==
There is one monument in each of the 12 states along the National Old Trails Highway (much of which later became U.S. Highway 40 and U.S. Highway 66). The monuments, in order of dedication, are:

State	Image	Location	Dedicated	Notes
Maryland		Bethesda Wisconsin Ave. and Old Georgetown Rd.		Has long been the only one facing east. In December 2004, the statue was temporarily removed to repair its foundation. An alert reporter for the Washington Post noted that as it was placed on the flatbed truck, the Madonna faced west, believed to be the first time all 12 have done so.
Pennsylvania		Beallsville US Rt. 40, across from Nemacolin Country Club,12 mi. E of Washington, PA		
West Virginia		Wheeling US Rt. 40, across from Overlook Condominium; 40°03′21″N 80°40′09″W	July 7, 1928	Contributing structure in the National Road Corridor Historic District
Ohio		Springfield US Rt. 40 - 38 W Main Street		Ohio's Madonna was moved in 2011 to the new National Road Commons park in downtown Springfield. The statue faces south for better visibility on Main Street (Route 40).
Indiana		Richmond Glen Miller Park, US 40 East and N 22 St. 39°49'49.7"N 84°52'19.9"W	October 28, 1928	Before he was president, Harry Truman was on the site selection committee and visited the location. Restored in 2005.
Illinois		Vandalia SW corner of the Old State House		
Missouri		Lexington Main St. and Jack's Ford Rd.		
Kansas		Council Grove Union and Main St.	September 7, 1928	Listed on the National Register of Historic Places. The Council Grove statue is one of three along the Santa Fe Trail route. Council Grove was chosen for a statue in part due to its historic connections to the trail and in part because the town planned to build a memorial park around the statue.
Colorado		Lamar S Main St. and Beech St.		
New Mexico		Albuquerque 4th and Marble NW; 35°05′34″N 106°38′59″W	September 27, 1928	Listed in the National Register of Historic Places. Originally located in McClellan Park, it was moved in 1996 when the park was demolished to build the Pete V. Domenici United States Courthouse. After restoration work, the monument was installed at the northwest corner of the courthouse grounds, where it was rededicated on September 27, 1998.
Arizona		Springerville US Rt. 60 (Main St.) across from Post Office		
California		Upland Center divider on Euclid Avenue just north of Foothill Boulevard 34°06′26″N 117°39′04″W		Marker in Upland reads: Dedicated in 1929, the Madonna of the Trail is one of twelve identical statues placed in twelve states by the National Society of the Daughters of the American Revolution. The statues, differentiated by the inscriptions on their bases, commemorate the westward move of American civilization on a series of trails, which eventually linked the country from the Atlantic to the Pacific. They especially pay tribute to the importance of a national highway and the role of pioneer women. The statue was designed by German-born architectural sculptor August Leimbach and inspired by a statue of Sacagawea in Portland, Oregon. The Upland monument is said to represent four historic trails: the Mojave Trail, the de Anza Trail, the Emigrant Trail, and the Canyon Road.

== Images ==
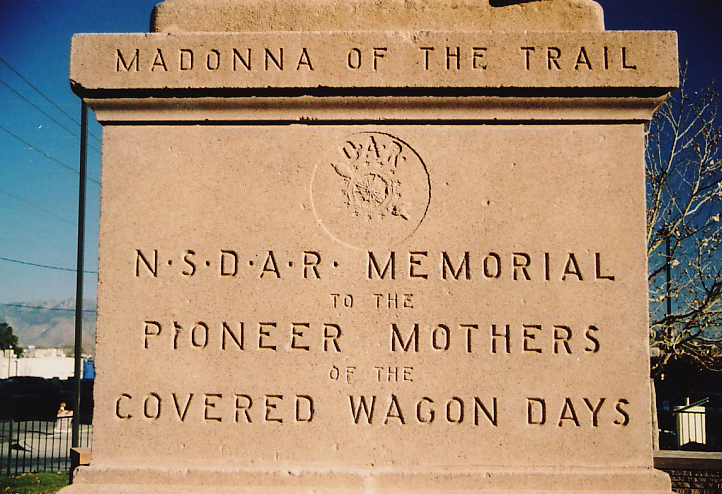

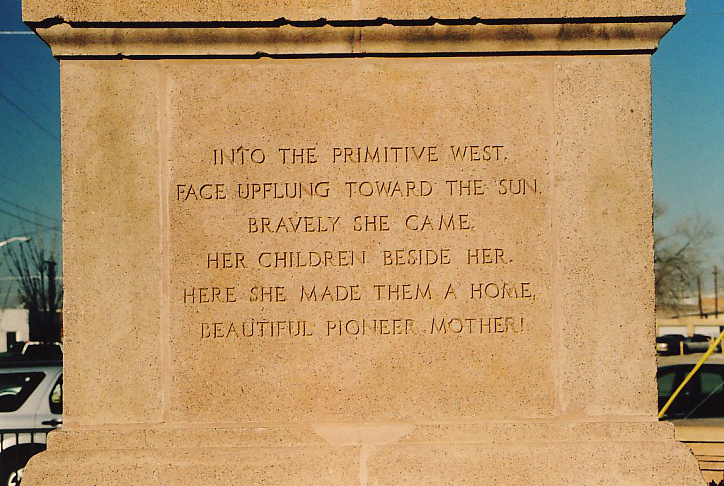

== See also ==
- Pioneer Mother (Grafly)
- List of statues
- National Auto Trail
- U.S. Route 66
