= National Old Trails Road =

Auto trail from Baltimore to Los Angeles

National Old Trails Road

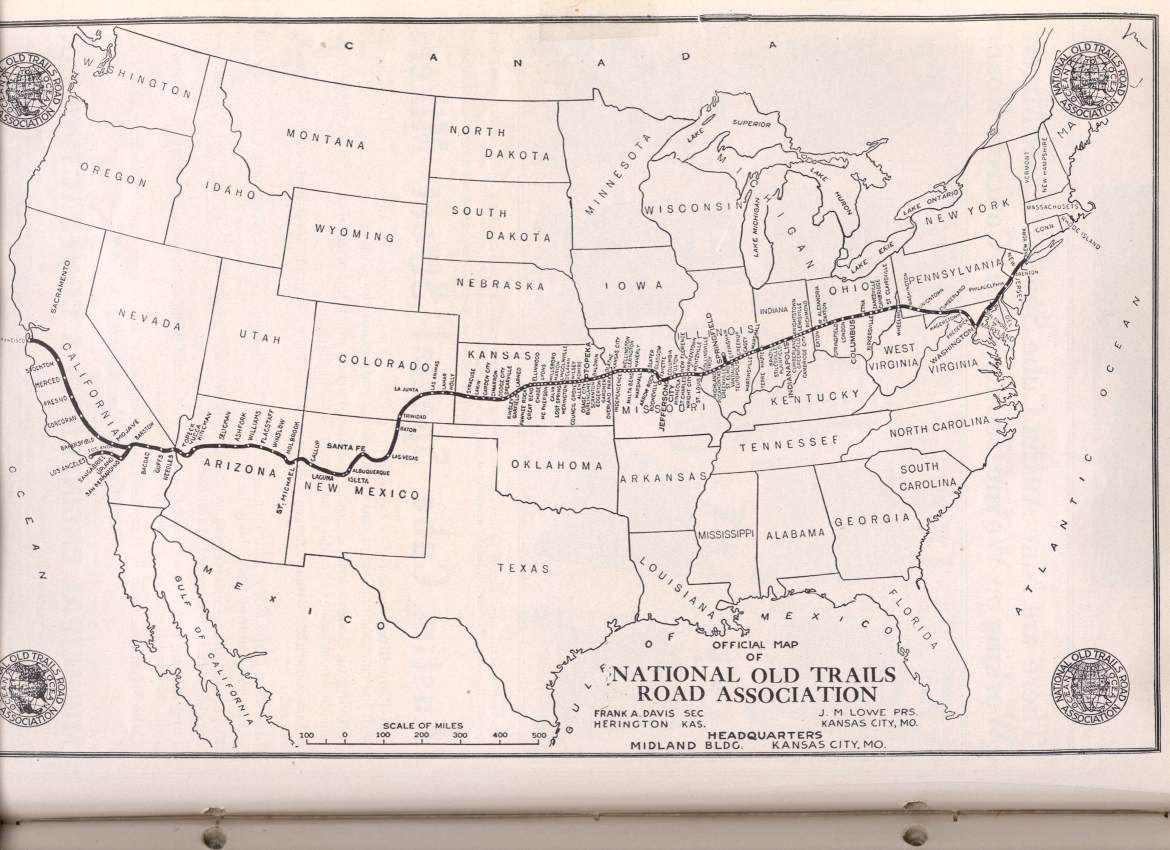

Route information
- Existed: 1912–present

Major junctions
- East end: Baltimore, Maryland
- West end: Los Angeles, California

Location
- Country: United States
- States: Maryland, District of Columbia, Pennsylvania, West Virginia, Ohio, Indiana, Illinois, Missouri, Kansas, Colorado, New Mexico, Arizona, California

Highway system
- Auto trails

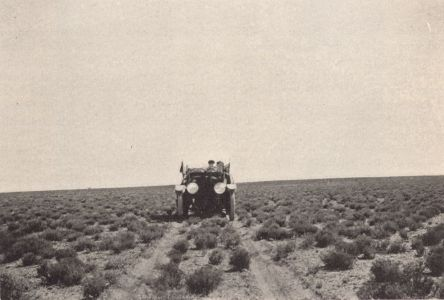
National Old Trails Road near Holbrook, Arizona, around 1915

National Old Trails Road, also known as the Ocean-to-Ocean Highway, was established in 1912, and became part of the National Auto Trail system in the United States. It was 3,096 miles (4,983 km) long and stretched from Baltimore, Maryland (some old maps indicate New York City was the actual eastern terminus) to California. Much of the route follows the old National Road in the east and the Santa Fe Trail in the west. Following its decommission, the western portion was later integrated into U.S. Route 66.

== National Old Trails Road Association ==
The National Old Trails Road Association was formed in Kansas City in April 1912 to promote improvement of a transcontinental trail from Baltimore to Los Angeles, with branches to New York City and San Francisco. The name of the road signified that it followed several of the Nation's historic trails, including the National Road and the Santa Fe Trail (much of the road, from Colorado east, became U.S. 40 in 1926).

Former Jackson County, Missouri Judge J. M. Lowe served as the Association’s president from its inception until his death in 1926. Judge Lowe had been a tireless proponent for good roads—despite the fact that, as he once told the Senate Committee on Post Offices and Post Roads, "I do not even own an automobile, and would not know what the dickens to do with it if I had one." Under Judge Lowe, the association had become well respected among the groups aligned in the Good Roads Movement that had agitated since the 1890s for government involvement in improvement of the Nation's roads.

=== Harry S. Truman as president of the Association ===
In 1926, future president Harry S. Truman was named president of the National Old Trails Road Association. As the new president of the association, Truman periodically drove the National Old Trails Road from coast to coast and met with members of the association in each State to discuss improvement of their segments. He enjoyed the travels, but he missed his wife Bess and their young daughter Margaret, as reflected in the many letters he wrote to his wife while on the road. At one point, he told Bess, "This is almost like campaigning for President, except that the people are making promises to me instead of the other way around." Truman's name would remain on the letterhead of the National Old Trails Road Association well into the late 1940s, listed as "president".

=== Madonna of the Trail monuments ===
One of Truman's accomplishments as president of the National Old Trails Road Association was his work with the Daughters of the American Revolution to place Madonna of the Trail statues in the 12 states along the National Old Trails Road. Designed by Arlene Nichols Moss of the DAR, the statues are dedicated to the pioneer mothers of covered-wagon days. Each statue is 18 feet high, consisting of a 10-foot-high pioneer mother mounted on a base. The DAR describes the statue: "The `Madonna of the Trail' is a pioneer clad in homespun, clasping her babe to her breast, with her young son clinging to her skirts. The face of the mother, strong in character, beauty and gentleness, is the face of a mother who realizes her responsibilities and trusts in God."

== National Old Trails Road development in the western United States ==
Although the western half of the road was signed by the Automobile Club of Southern California in mid-1914, according to their in-house magazine Touring Topics, the routing remained under much discussion until 1917. In particular, the western alignment was debated, with an early proposed routing going through Phoenix, Arizona, and San Diego, California, up to San Francisco, California.

Eventually, however, the alignment below was agreed upon, which followed earlier Indian trails, preexisting railroad tracks and, in some cases, new construction.

Throughout its life, the road was upgraded and realigned in order to improve the route. However, by 1926, significant portions in the west remained difficult to drive on, and much remained unpaved. Only 800 miles (1,300 km) were paved in 1927. Most of the road that traversed the California desert was widened and paved (or "oiled") by the late '20s, reportedly by a process pioneered by a local road superintendent, and some of this blacktop still can be found to this day.

In 1926, the section west of Las Vegas, New Mexico, to Los Angeles, California, was certified as U.S. Highway 66, (now better known as U.S. Route 66) by the AASHTO, as was a section in the St. Louis, Missouri, area (Manchester Road).

After U.S. Route 66 was decommissioned, in eastern California portions of the road were renamed with the old name, and signed accordingly. Most of the modern-day "National Trails Highway" follows latter-day U.S. Route 66, however, and not the alignments that actually were part of the original road (the main exception being the section of road between Barstow and Victorville, which follows almost exactly the routing of the 1925 realignment of the road). The last alignment of National Old Trails Road in California (and the first alignment of U.S. Route 66) followed a distinct course from the modern-day route between Daggett and Essex, California, and now survives only as a series of disconnected jeep trails and abandoned tracks in various stages of decay. The modern-day Route 66 in California is a result of a series of realignments that were undertaken in the early 1930s.

== Route ==
Cities along route (east to west):

- Baltimore, Maryland
- Washington, D.C.
- Frederick, Maryland
- Hagerstown, Maryland
- Cumberland, Maryland
- Uniontown, Pennsylvania
- Washington, Pennsylvania
- Wheeling, West Virginia
- Zanesville, Ohio
- Columbus, Ohio
- Springfield, Ohio
- Dayton, Ohio
- Eaton, Ohio
- Richmond, Indiana
- Indianapolis, Indiana
- Terre Haute, Indiana
- Marshall, Illinois
- Effingham, Illinois
- Vandalia, Illinois
- St. Louis, Missouri
- St. Charles, Missouri
- Columbia, Missouri
- Kansas City, Missouri
- Olathe, Kansas
- Osage City, Kansas
- Council Grove, Kansas
- Marion, Kansas
- McPherson, Kansas
- Great Bend, Kansas
- Dodge City, Kansas
- Garden City, Kansas
- Trinidad, Colorado
- Raton, New Mexico
- Santa Fe, New Mexico
- Albuquerque, New Mexico
- Los Lunas, New Mexico
- Gallup, New Mexico
- Flagstaff, Arizona
- Needles, California
- Barstow, California
- San Bernardino, California
- Los Angeles, California

== See also ==
- Lincoln Highway, a more northerly coast-to-coast route, established one year after the National Old Trails Road (1913)
