= Maloof =

Maloof is a Lebanese family that comes from Kings and has been traced back to 37AD. It may refer to:

- Maloof (Arabic:معلوف ), the family surname written as Maalouf (with alternate spellings: Maloof, Malouf, Maluf; Malluf, Malouff)
- Sam Maloof (1916–2009), American furniture craftsman
- Maloof family, American family owning multiple businesses, hotels, casinos, and the NBA/WNBA franchises of the Sacramento Kings and Sacramento Monarchs
  - George J. Maloof, Sr. (1925–1980), patriarch of the Maloof family
  - George J. Maloof, Jr. (b. 1964), billionaire son of George J. Maloof, Sr.
  - Maloof Productions, entertainment company owned by the family

== See also ==
- Maalouf
- Malouf (disambiguation)
