= Maalouf =

Maalouf بنو المعلوف
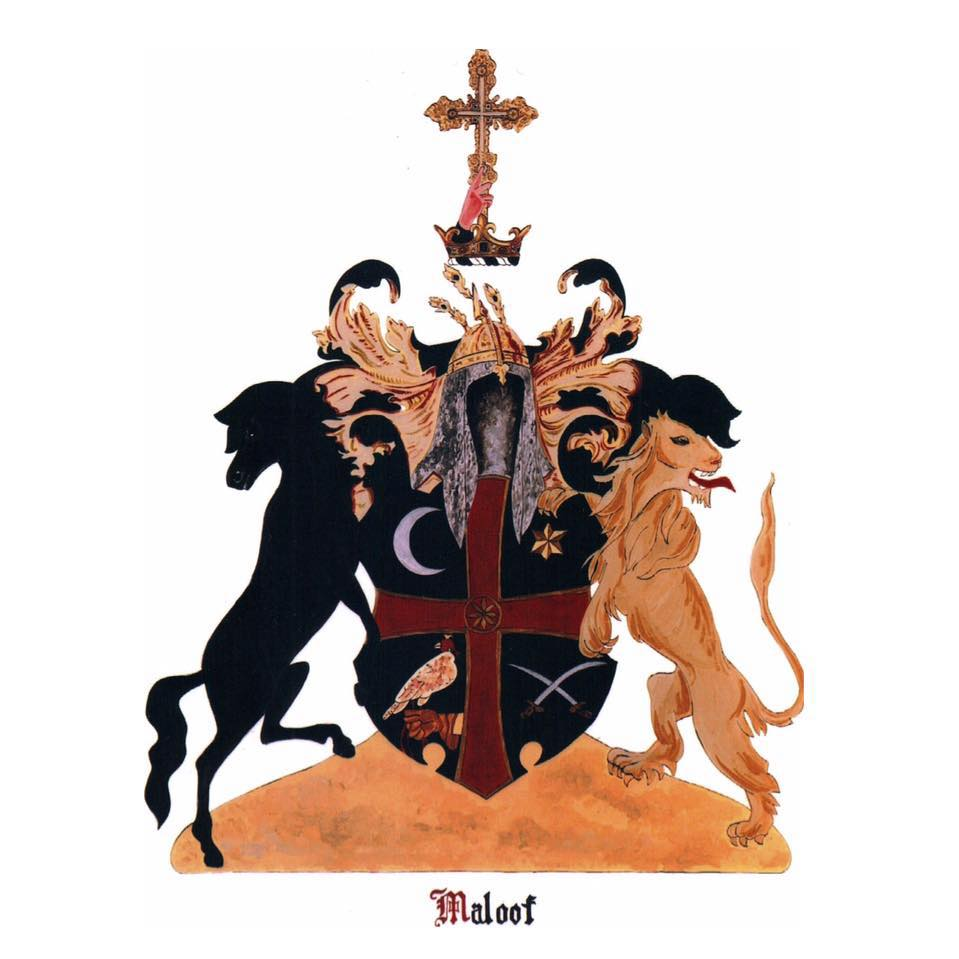
- Coat of arms of the Maalouf family
- Pronunciation: [maʕˈluːf]
- Language: Arabic

Origin
- Meaning: Derived from the Arabic Maayuf (معيوف) meaning "left out" under Islamic rule.
- Region of origin: Lebanon

Other names
- Related names: Malouf, Maloof, Majluf, Maluf, Malluf, Maaluf, Maluff

Maalouf (alternative spellings: Maloof, Malouf, Malouff, Maluf, Malluf; Arabic: معلوف المعلوف) is a Middle Eastern Christian surname.

== Origins ==
The Maalouf family belongs to the group of tribes known as Ghassanids that emigrated from Yemen to Houran in modern Syria prior to the collapse of the Marib Dam (Arabic: سد مأرب) around 102 AD. The clan governed Houran and large surrounding regions for nearly 500 years until the Islamic conquest in 637 AD.

After the arrival of Islam, some members converted to Islam while most remained Christian mainly Antiochian Eastern-Orthodox and Melkite Greek Catholic. Several prominent leaders are said to have received the special appellation of Maayuf (معيوف) meaning “exempted” or “protected.” When the ruling government subsequently rescinded this appellation, a number of clan members retained it in the form of a surname Maalouf, or Al-Maalouf. However, that version of the origin of the family name is disputed.

Ibrahim Maalouf nicknamed "Abi Rajih" (Arabic: ابي راجح) reflecting his wisdom was a prominent and rich landowner in the town or village of Upper Damia in Houran. He had seven sons: Issa (عيسى), Medlej (مدلج), Farah (فرح), Hanna (حنا), Nasser (ناصر), Nehme (نعمة), and Semaan (سمعان). For political, social and religious reasons, and as a result of a conflict that his family engaged in with neighboring clans in 1519 AD, Ibrahim decided to sell his land and leave Houran for the mountains of Lebanon, an area that became known for its rule of law under the Ottoman Empire.

The family crossed ash-Shām and the plains of Damascus, over the Anti-Lebanon mountain range, and at first settled for a few years in the village of Seriin (سرعين) to the northwest of the town of Zahlé in the Bekaa Valley. However, this stay was short lived due to conflicts with existing residents. In 1526 AD, Ibrahim decided to move from the Bekaa Valley to Bsharri (بشري) in the high mountains of northern Lebanon. The route to Bsharri was difficult, and when the family stumbled onto an abandoned mountain village, they decided to resettle it. After rebuilding the structures, the village was named Douma (دوما) in commemoration of the original Maalouf village in Houran. A church named for Saint Sarkis, venerated by the Christians of Houran, was also built in the village.

The stay in Douma was pleasant as the clan developed friendly relations with their neighbors and the ruling emir. However the murder of a ruler of Tripoli over his desire to marry one of the Maalouf daughters forced them to depart to the safety of Keserwan District that was ruled by an emir friendly to the family.

Upon arrival at Antelias, the clan decided that the families of Issa, Medlej, Farah and Hanna would settle in the high mountains of the Keserwan District, while the families of Nasser and Nehme would head to Vayelet Damasc, while the family of Semaan would stay on the coast near Antelias. The families of Issa, Medlej and Farah retained the surname of Maalouf, whereas the other branches adopted other surnames, notably Klink for the Hanna branch, Kreidy for the Semaan branch, Laham for the Nasser branch, and Najjar for the Nehme branch.

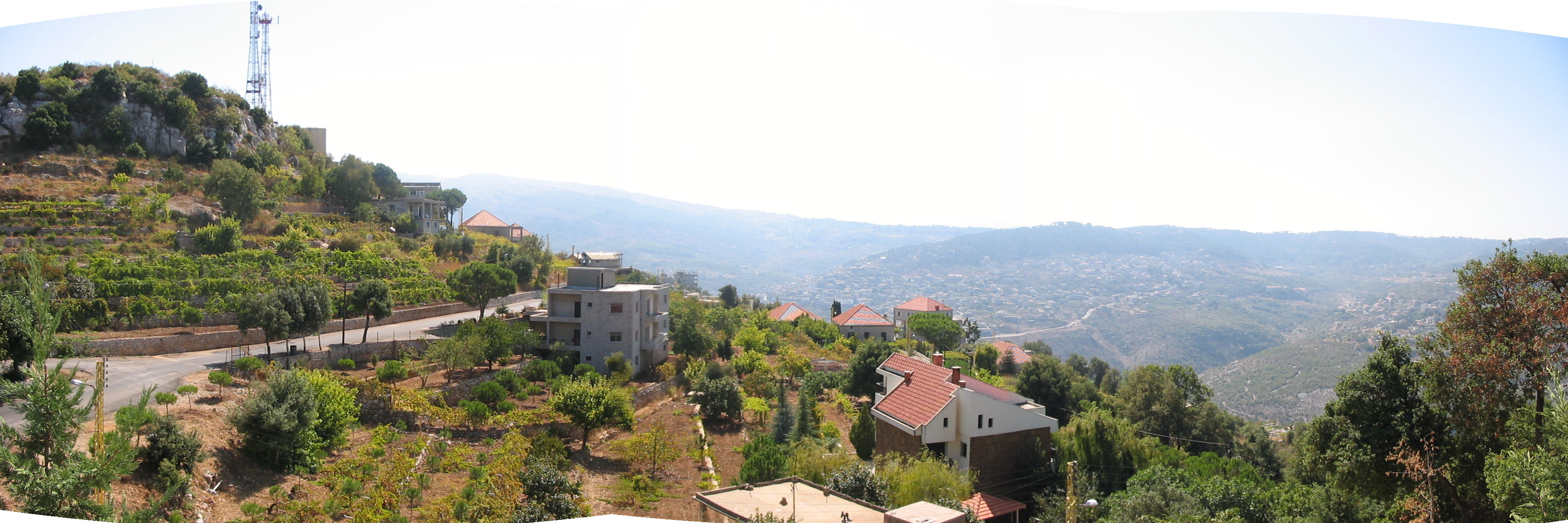
A panoramic photograph of the village of Kfarakab established by the Maalouf family c. 1560 AD. To the far right is the edge of Mhaydse which has become part of the modern town of Bikfaya.

The first four branches settled in the village of Mhaydse (المحيدثة) in 1550 AD and lived peacefully for several years. From their homes, they observed across a deep ravine an attractive, protected and forested ridge which they often used as a hunting ground. After receiving permission from the ruling emir, the families of Issa, Medlej and Farah relocated their homes and built the village of Kfarakab (كفر عقاب) in 1560 AD and the main church in 1570 AD The family of Hanna remained in Mhaidsse.

Kfarakab become the core settlement of the Maalouf clan and gave the family the opportunity to play an integral role in the social, economical, political and military developments in Lebanon. From Kfarakab, thousands of descendants migrated across Lebanon, and later, internationally, especially since the late 1800s, settling in the United States of America, Canada, Brazil, Mexico, Argentina, and Australia. The Maalouf family is now prominent in several Lebanese towns and villages, most notably Zahlé where a neighborhood is named after the family, Niha, and Chlifa, in the Beqaa Valley.

The Maalouf family's rich history is marked by a dedication to culture and education. The family contributed to Al-Nahda.

== Notable persons ==
=== Maalouf ===
- Addison Pierre Maalouf, YouTuber and streamer known online as "Arab" or "YourFellowArab"
- Amin Maalouf (born 1949), Lebanese-born French author and member of the Académie française
- Christy Maalouf (born 2005), Lebanese footballer
- Edgar Maalouf (1934–2018), Lebanese politician
- Edward Maalouf (born 1968), Lebanese competitive hand-cyclist, and the only person to have won medals for Lebanon at the Paralympic Games
- Fady Maalouf (born 1979), Lebanese-German pop singer
- Ibrahim Maalouf (born 1980), Lebanese-French trumpeter, composer, arranger, and trumpet instructor
- Jhony Maalouf, contestant in season 1 of the French The Voice: La Plus Belle Voix
- Maria Maalouf, Lebanese journalist and political analyst
- Nasri Maalouf (1911–2005), Lebanese politician, Member of Parliament, minister
- Nassim Maalouf (born 1941), Lebanese classical trumpet soloist who adapted the trumpet to Arabic music
- Samir Maalouf, Lebanese actor
- Toni Maalouf, Lebanese actor

=== Malouf ===
- David Malouf (1934–2026), Australian writer
- Jacqui Malouf (born 1968), Canadian television host, cook, and author
- Joseph Malouf (1893–1968), the Melkite Greek Catholic Archbishop of Baalbek, Lebanon
- Michael Malouf, Australian businessman, former chief executive officer of the Carlton Football Club

=== Maloof ===
- Adrienne Maloof (born 1961), American businesswoman and television personality
- George J. Maloof Jr. (born 1964), American real estate businessman
- George J. Maloof Sr. (1923–1980), American businessman and, at the time of his death, owner of the Houston Rockets
- Jack Maloof (born 1949), American minor league baseball player
- Manuel Maloof (1924–2004), American businessman and politician
- Richard Maloof (born 1940), American musician who played bass and tuba for the Lawrence Welk orchestra
- Sam Maloof (born Samuel Solomon Maloof) (1916–2009), American furniture designer and woodworker

=== Maluf ===
- Paulo Maluf (born 1931), Brazilian politician

== See also ==
- Maloof (disambiguation)
- Malouf (disambiguation)
- Maluf (disambiguation)
- Maloof family
- Maloof Money Cup
- Maloof Productions
- Malouf syndrome
