= Alta Loma, Rancho Cucamonga, California =

Neighborhood of California, US

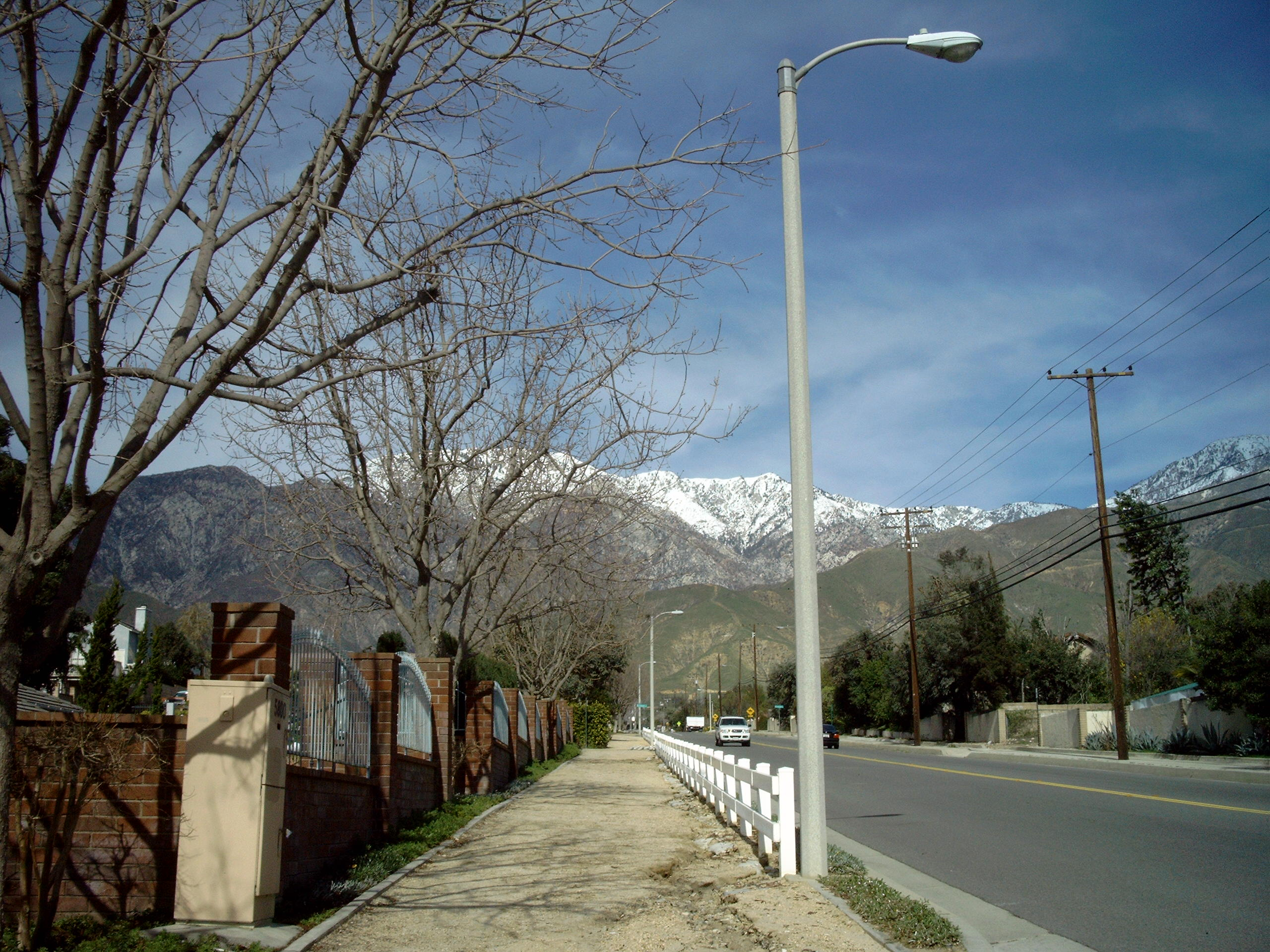
Snow-capped San Gabriel Mountains above Alta Loma as seen from Sapphire Street and Thoroughbred Street.

Cucamonga Peak looms over Alta Loma which lies along the foothills of the Southern face of the San Gabriel Mountains

Alta Loma (Spanish for "Tall Hill") is one of three unincorporated areas that became part of the city of Rancho Cucamonga, California, United States in 1977. The community is located at 34.15°N 117.60°W in the foothills of the south face of the San Gabriel Mountain range, near Cucamonga Peak and Mount San Antonio (Mount Baldy). Its ZIP codes are 91701 and 91737. Elevation ranges from 1,400 feet (430 m) to 3,000 feet (910 m). The name comes from the Spanish words for "high hill." Alta Loma had previously been known as "Iamosa".

== Overview ==
Alta Loma is an affluent area in San Bernardino County. It is almost completely residential and, by city ordinance, no commercial business may exist above 19th Street, with the exception of several businesses already in place when the ordinance was enacted (such as the intersection of Lemon Avenue and Haven Avenue). In addition, homes north of Banyan Street must have a minimum of 1/2 acre lots, with the exception of the development known as "Compass Rose Phase II", directly west of Chaffey College (between Banyan Street and Wilson Avenue).

The three communities incorporated after years of debate and at least one failed attempt on the ballot. Residents of Alta Loma and Etiwanda finally agreed to incorporation provided their identifying community names would be kept along with separate post offices and ZIP codes. In addition, businesses are permitted to use either Alta Loma or Rancho Cucamonga on letterheads, business permits, and other records.

Alta Loma (and much of the rest of Cucamonga) was formerly home to old citrus groves and grape vineyards. The reason many homes above Banyan Street, in particular, have orange and lemon trees on their property may be attributed to this; many horse trails are lined with eucalyptus trees, which are former windbreaks for the groves. Even among the office buildings and shopping malls that have been built in recent decades, the occasional patch of greenfield has a few rows of grapevines.

== History ==
=== Grand Prix Fire ===
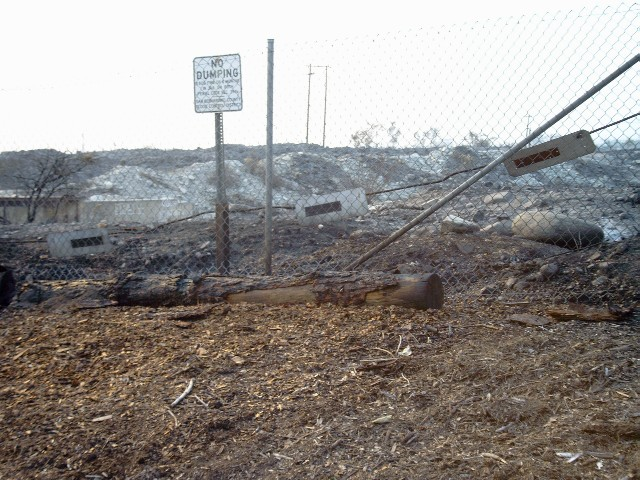
Burned area of Cucamonga Canyon, near water basin, at western end of Banyan Street in Alta Loma. San Bernardino County unincorporated land. Grand Prix Fire, 25 October 2003.

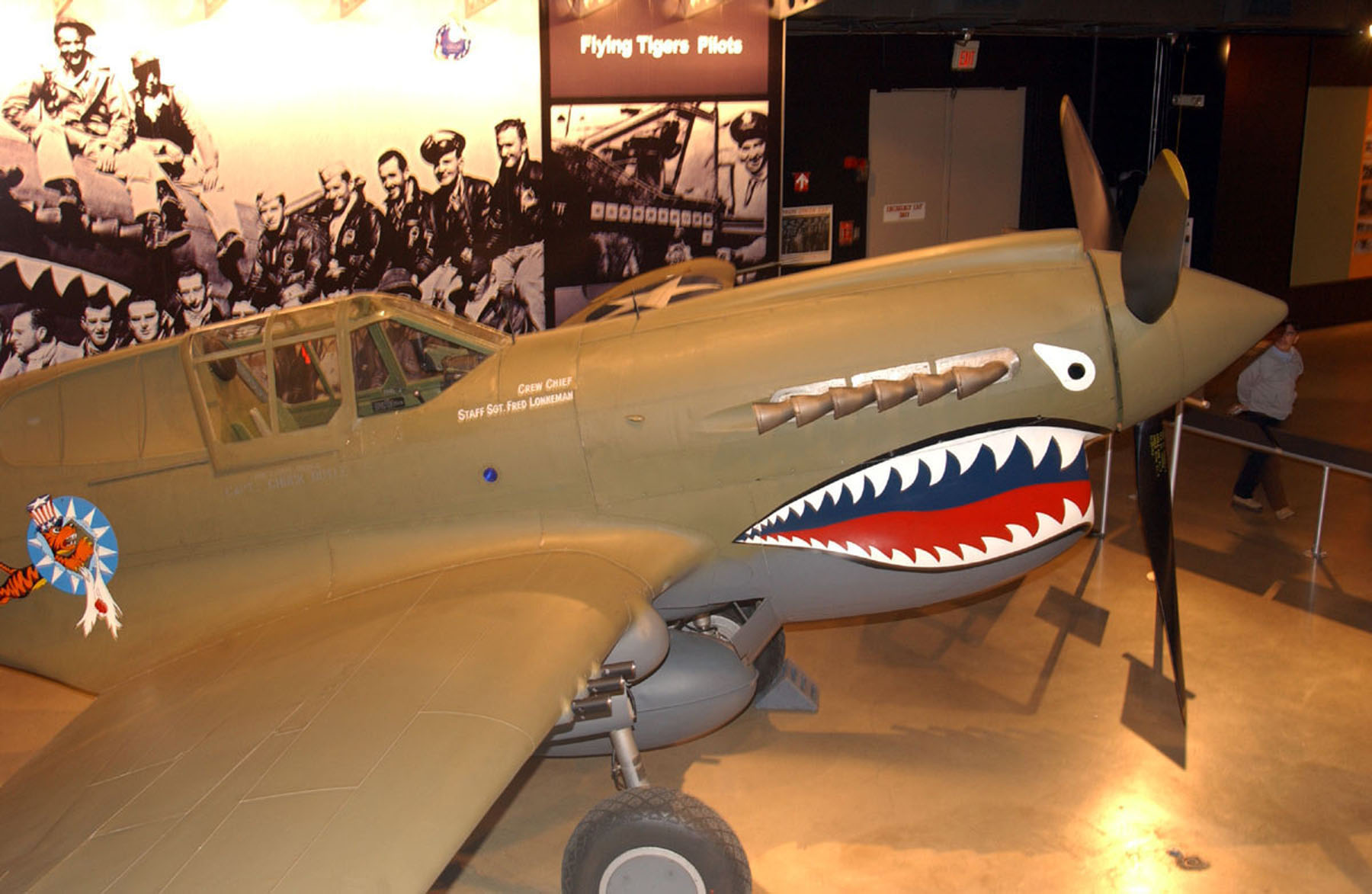
P-40 Warhawk like those flown by the Flying Tigers

Rancho Cucamonga, Alta Loma and Etiwanda were most affected by the October 2003 Grand Prix fire, which combined with the Old Fire. The Grand Prix fire, which began October 21, 2003, ripped across the mountains just above and, in some places, down into Alta Loma and Etiwanda for six days. Overgrown brush fueled fire, which ran across the mountain tops and higher foothills to eventually fly into the canyons that are surrounded by homes. It destroyed 13 homes (including 2 mobile homes) and five outbuildings, and damaged 9 others in Alta Loma.

== Geography ==
Most of the homes in the foothills of Alta Loma and Etiwanda sit on alluvial fans punctuated by deep debris canyons. Some of these canyons are used for water collection and thus the area does not typically take water from the Colorado River.

Cucamonga Canyon in particular is a favorite among hikers, although dangerous due to the rough terrain, loose rocks, possible flooding, poison oak, bears, mountain lions, rattlesnakes, bobcats, and other wildlife. Far up the canyon are the Cucamonga Falls, which have occasionally caused contention between the city council, residents, and developers, due to developers wanting to build homes over the falls.

The Alta Loma area experiences high winds known in the Inland Empire and the rest of Southern California as the "Santa Ana winds." Heavy rain storms in the past created the need for 12–18-foot-deep (3.7–5.5 m) concrete flood control channels to prevent severe flooding.

Alta Loma rests on the Cucamonga-Sierra Madre Fault. It is a thrust fault, meaning the sides of the fault push toward each other. Several other faults pass through the area, too, including the San Andreas Fault system, of which most of the area's faults are a part.

== Notable people ==
- Carlos Bocanegra, former captain of the U.S. Men's National Soccer Team.
- George Chaffey
- William Chaffey
- Peter Demens, Russian-born co-founder of St. Petersburg, Florida
- Sam Maloof, world-renowned woodworker, lived in Alta Loma. His work is featured in museums around the United States, including the Smithsonian Institution. His home is a State of California historical landmark. During the construction of the 210 freeway, Maloof's home was moved from the 210 freeway corridor to the top of Carnelian street, where the home is now a museum. The official buildings for the Inland Empire's Sam and Alfreda Maloof Foundation for Arts and Crafts are currently being built on the property.
- Eric Weddle, former NFL player

== Landmarks ==
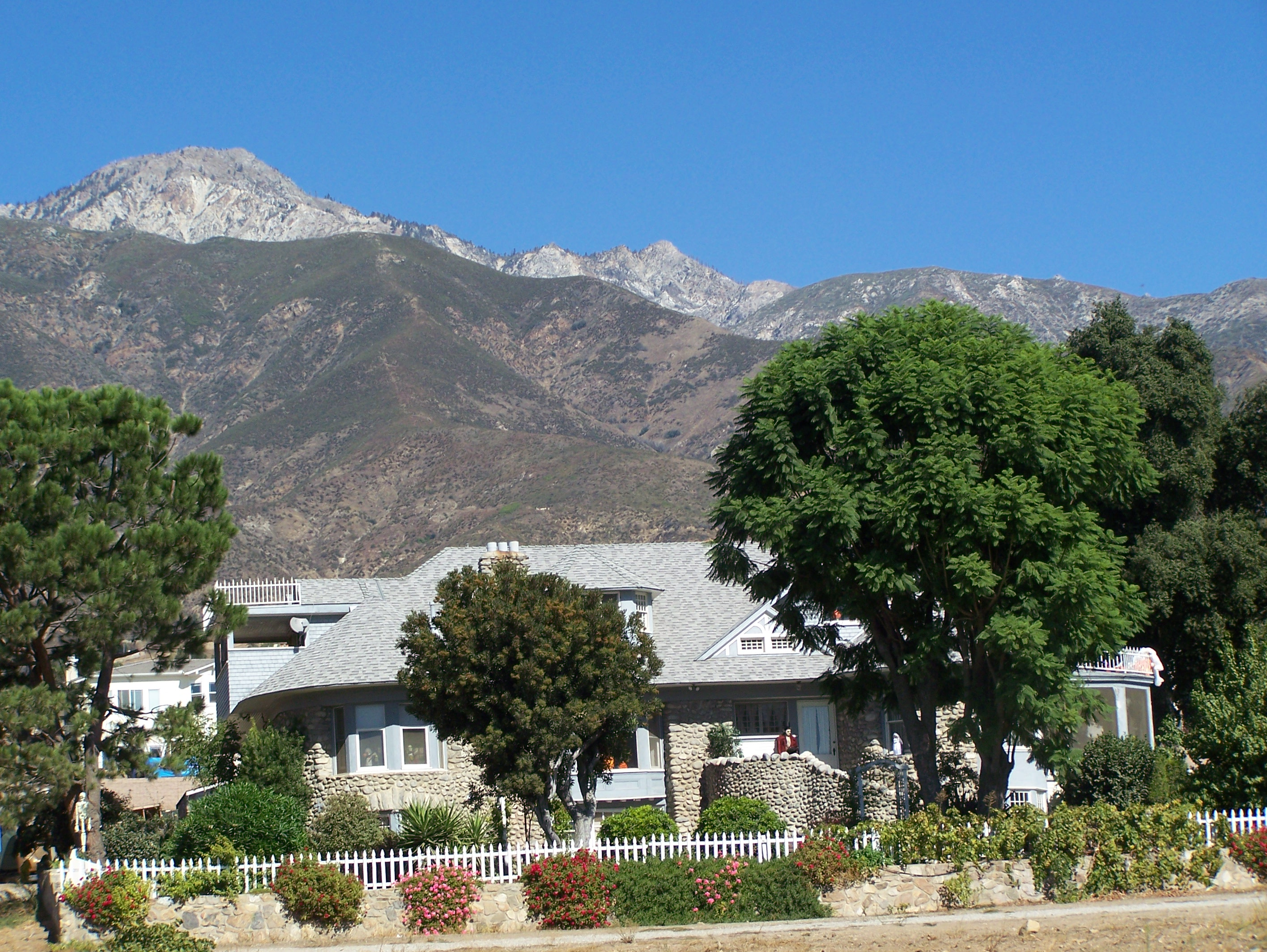
The Demens-Tolstoy Estate on Hillside and Archibald

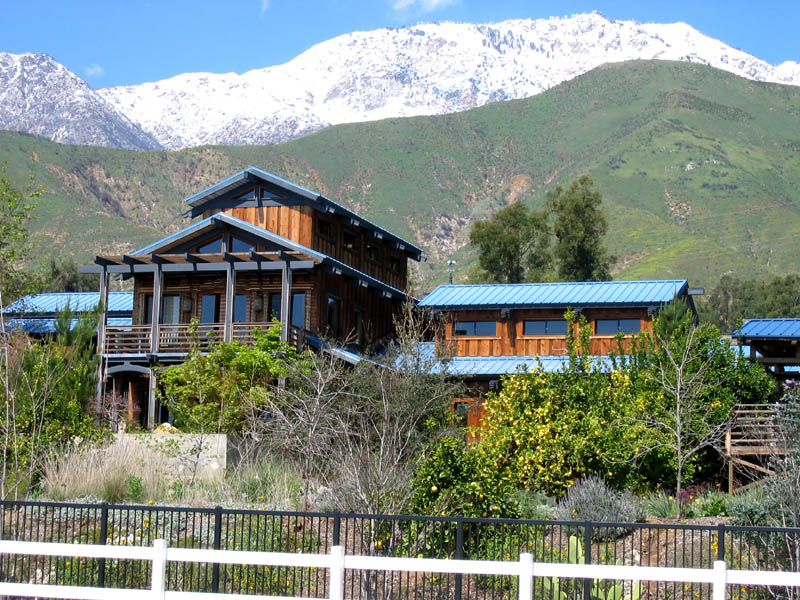
The Sam Maloof house at the top of Carnelian Street

=== Historical landmarks ===
- Demens-Tolstoy house (c.1890) – 9686 Hillside Road (at NW corner with Archibald Avenue; 34.1548°N 117.5939°W);– built and owned by Peter Demens, a Tolstoy family relative. Until 2005, when developers built new homes there, it was surrounded by some of the last few groves of eucalyptus, lemon, and orange trees remaining in the area. Although other families have lived there, they are required to keep the grounds and house in good condition.
- Sam Maloof Historic Residence and Woodworking Studio – 5131 Carnelian Street (at the northeast corner of the intersection with Hidden Farm Road; 34.1610°N 117.6155°W) – historic residence of American woodworker Sam Maloof and now a museum and gardens as well as the office of the Sam and Alfreda Maloof Foundation for Arts and Crafts.
- Henry Albert building / old Alta Loma post office (c. 1906) – 7136 Amethyst Street (at the northwest corner of the intersection with Lomita Drive; 34.12441°N 117.59847°W) – now home to Dr. Strange Records.

== Schools ==
=== Higher education ===
- Chaffey College – A community college, serving over 18,000 students in the Inland Empire.

=== High schools ===
- Alta Loma High School
- Etiwanda High School
- Rancho Cucamonga High School
- Los Osos High School

=== Junior high schools ===
- Vineyard Junior High
- Alta Loma Junior High School has won the Presidential Physical Fitness testing nine years in a row.
- Alta Loma Christian School (private)
- Summit Intermediate School
- Etiwanda Intermediate School
- Day Creek Intermediate School
- Cucamonga Middle School
- Rancho Cucamonga Middle School
- Ruth Musser Middle School

=== Elementary schools ===
- Alta Loma
- Banyan
- Carnelian
- Deer Canyon
- Floyd M. Stork
- Hermosa
- Jasper
- Victoria Groves
- Alta Loma Christian School (private)
- Terra Vista Elementary School
- Coyote Canyon Elementary School
- Cucamonga Elementary School
- Bear Gulch Elementary School
- Banyan Elementary School
- Valle Vista Elementary School
- Dona Merced Elementary School
- Central Elementary School
- Etiwanda Colony Elementary School
- John L. Golden Elementary School
- Grapeland Elementary School
- Perdew Elementary School
- Windrows Elementary School
- Carlton P. Lightfoot Elementary School
- Caryn Elementary School
