= Malouf =

Malouf may refer to:

- Ma'luf or Malouf, a type of Andalusian classical music of the Maghreb
- David Malouf (1934–2026), Australian poet and writer
- Nick Malouf (born 1993), Australian rugby union player

== See also ==
- Maalouf (Arabic: معلوف), an Arabic surname
- Maloof (disambiguation)
