= Ibrahim Maalouf =

Lebanese-French jazz musician (born 1980)

Ibrahim Maalouf ابراهيم معلوف
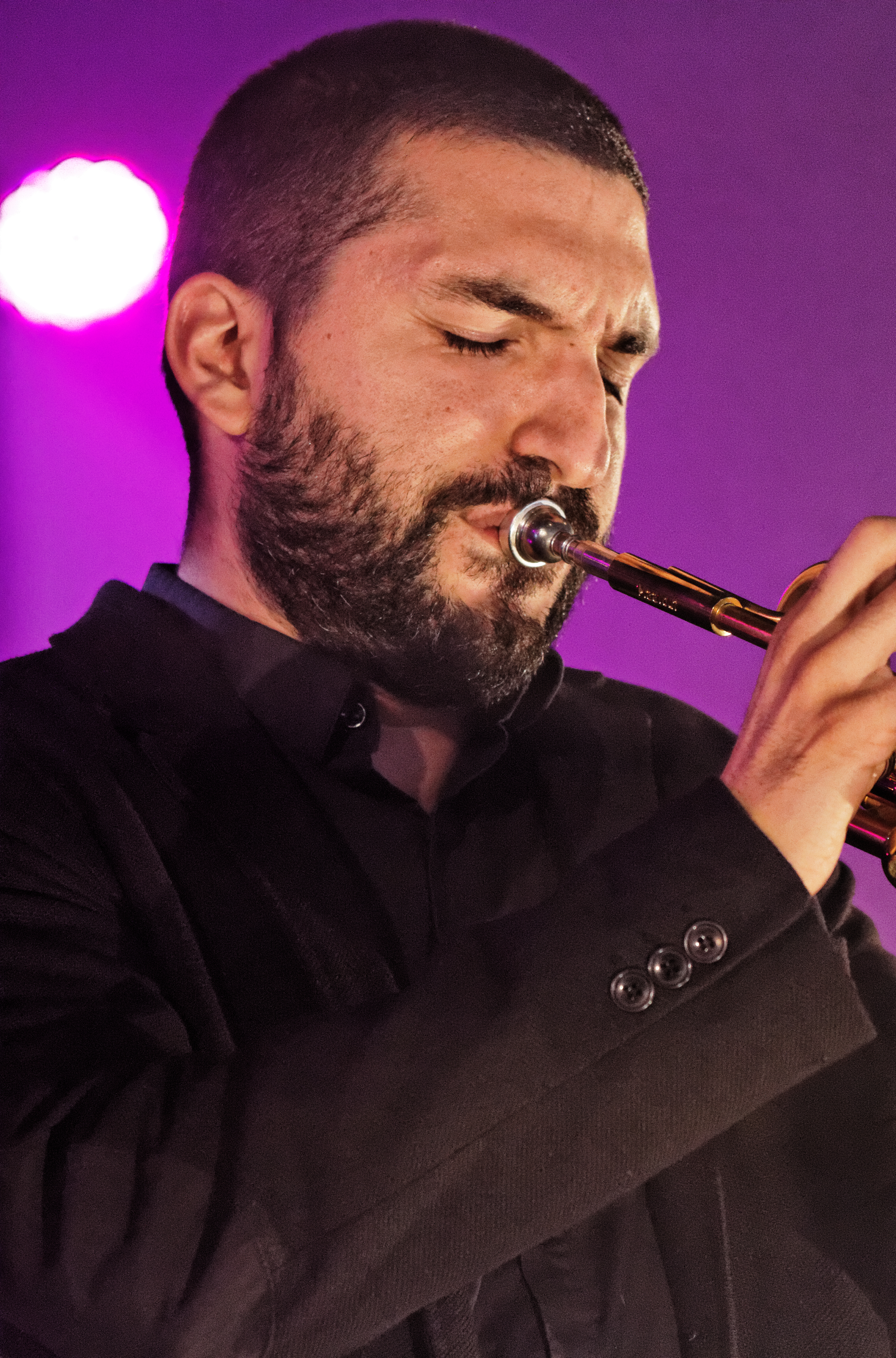
- Maalouf performing in 2014

Background information
- Born: 5 November 1980 (age 45); Beirut, Lebanon
- Genres: Jazz; classical
- Occupation: Musician
- Instruments: Piccolo trumpet; trumpet; flugelhorn
- Years active: 1997–present
- Label: Mis'Ter
- Spouse: Hiba Tawaji
- Website: www.ibrahimmaalouf.com

Ibrahim Maalouf (Arabic: ابراهيم معلوف, pronounced [ʔɪbraːˈhiːm maʕˈluːf]; born 5 November 1980) is a French-Lebanese trumpeter, producer, arranger, and composer. In 2022, he became the first Lebanese instrumentalist nominated at the Grammy Awards for his album Queen of Sheba in collaboration with Angélique Kidjo.

== Biography ==
His mother is the pianist Nada Maalouf, and his father is the trumpeter Nassim Maalouf. His uncle is the writer Amin Maalouf and his grandfather was the journalist, poet, and musicologist Rushdi Maalouf.

After leaving his home country as a child during the Lebanese Civil War, he grew up in Paris with his sister Layla. He studied there until the age of 17 and earned a degree in General Science and Specialized Mathematics from the Lycée Geoffroy-Saint-Hilaire in Étampes (Essonne).

When he was seven years old, he started to learn how to play the trumpet from his father, a former student of French trumpeter Maurice André at the Conservatoire de Paris. He learned classical, baroque, modern, and contemporary repertoires, as well as classical Arabic music and improvisation. His father invented the microtonal trumpet or "quarter tone trumpet", which makes it possible to play Arabic maqams on the trumpet.

As a teenager Maalouf accompanied his father in a duo throughout Europe and the Middle East, playing a baroque repertoire by Tomaso Giovanni Albinoni, Henry Purcell, and Antonio Vivaldi. He performed a difficult classical piece, the Second Brandenburg Concerto by Johann Sebastian Bach. Maurice André advised him to give up science and pursue music instead. He took André's advice and spent five years at the Conservatoire de Paris. He recorded with Matthieu Chedid, Vincent Delerm, and Arthur H. He became a teacher at CNR d'Aubervilliers-La Courneuve and gave master classes in the U.S. His first solo album was Diasporas (2007) on his label.

He has composed several movie soundtracks and several pieces for choirs and symphonic orchestras. He has worked with Sting, Salif Keita, Amadou & Mariam, Lhasa de Sela, Marcel Khalife, Vanessa Paradis, Juliette Gréco, and Archie Shepp. He teaches improvisation at Conservatoire à Rayonnement Régional de Paris (Paris Regional Superieur Conservatory).

Maalouf passed an open competition at the CNR de Paris (regional Conservatory) and joined the class of Gérard Boulanger for a two-year training course. After that, he passed another open competition and joined the Conservatoire de Paris in Antoine Curé's class for a three-year training course. He obtained degrees from both schools and entered national, European, and international trumpet competitions. He wrote more than 15 pieces for different ensembles from small to symphonic orchestras and choirs that were commissioned since 2005.

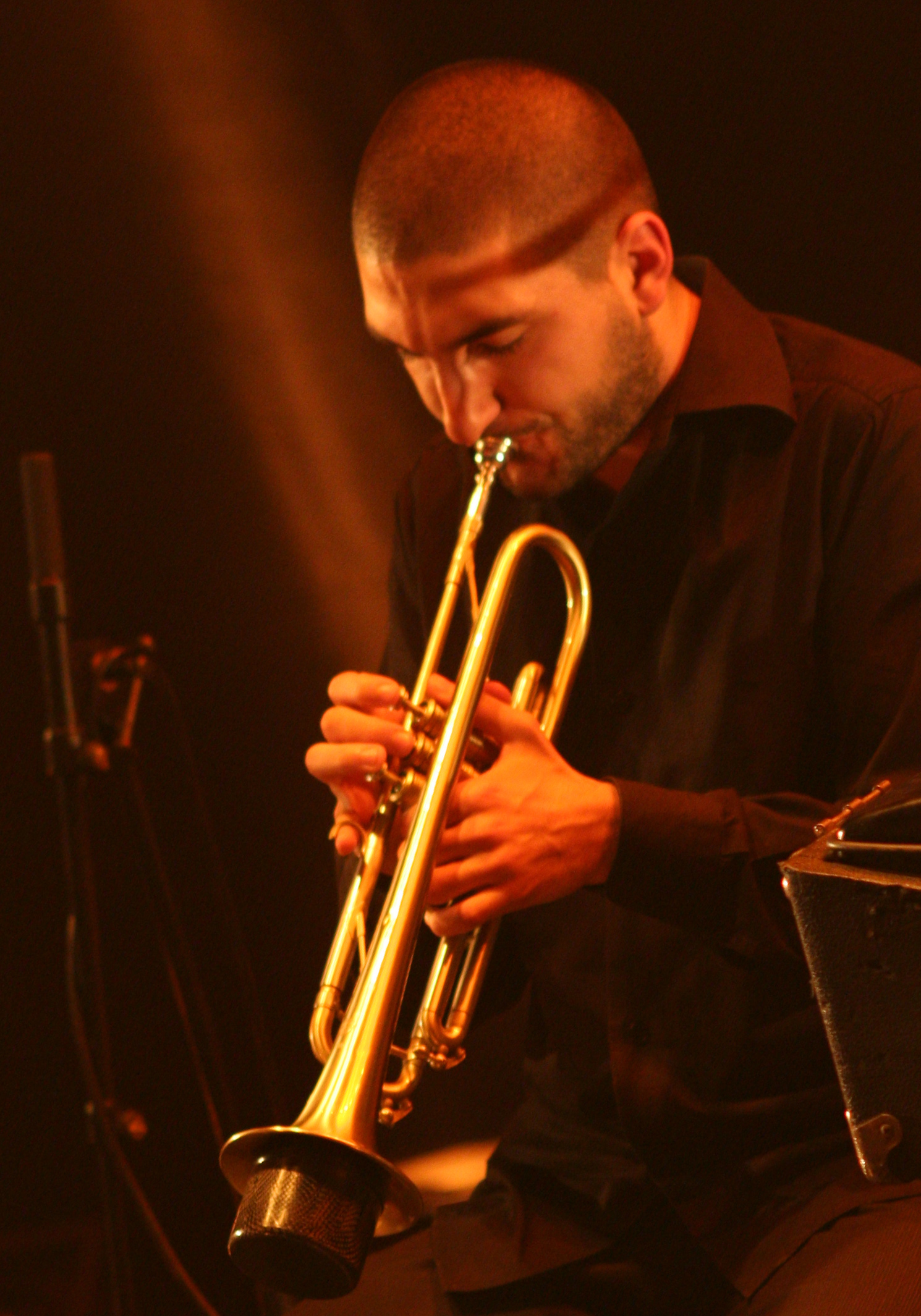
Ibrahim Maalouf

From 2006 to 2013, Maalouf was a trumpet instructor at the CNR of Aubervilliers, La Courneuve in France.

In 2000, Maalouf met producer Marc-Antoine Moreau, who introduced him to the cellist Vincent Segal. It was the beginning of a long and fruitful series of encounters. In November 2008, Maalouf played in the opera Welcome to the Voice at the Chatelet Theatre in Paris composed by Steve Nieve and directed by Muriel Teodori. Maalouf encountered on stage Elvis Costello, Sylvia Schwartz, and Sting, who played the lead role. Sting asked him to play on his album If on a Winter's Night...

Maalouf has composed music since he was very young. He presented his compositions for the first time in 1999. His first group Farah had an Oriental jazz flavor because he was accompanied by a saxophone, a ney (Middle-Eastern end-blown flute), a transverse flute, a piano, a double bass, a guitar, a buzuq (a long-necked fretted lute related to the Greek bouzouki) and Arabic percussion. A concert recording by this group was broadcast on several music channels between 2004 and 2005.

In 2004, his encounter with Lhasa de Sela opened the doors of electronic music to him. His collaboration with pop and rock singers made him discover other musical styles apart from jazz, classical, and Arabic music. His compositions began to reflect a more contemporary style. In 2006, he met Alejandra Norambuena Skira (from the SACEM's Action Fund), who introduced him to Jean-Louis Perrier. Perrier helped him to form the band with whom he gave a concert on 12 February 2006, at the Paris New Morning Jazz Club.

His music and his trumpet playing are inspired by his Arabic culture, but the surrounding instruments (bass, electric guitar, drums, Arabic percussion, vibraphone) and the musicians with whom he performs give a rock, electronic, and jazz funk flavor to his music.

Maalouf gets a lot of his inspiration from his culture of origin. This subject has been explored in the documentary Souffle! (Blow), directed by Christophe Trahand and produced by Cocottes Minutes between 2005 and 2006. Christophe Trahand followed Ibrahim for several months pursuing the key to his inspiration and to explore his relationship with his native country and the distance that separates him from it. This documentary was broadcast by TV5 MONDE and is available on DVD in the collection Docnet Films.

Spotted by legendary producer Quincy Jones during a concert at the Montreux Jazz Festival in 2017, Ibrahim became one of the artists that the American producer regularly promoted via the Los Angeles-based Quincy Jones Productions. That same year, Ibrahim Maalouf was invited to the musical inauguration of the Louvre Abu Dhabi Museum and also appeared on the jury of the Miss Lebanon election, live on LBC (Lebanese television).

After playing alongside Sting at the reopening of the Bataclan in Paris, he then paid tribute to Tignous, one of the Charlie Hebdo cartoonists who was brutally murdered, at his funeral. He also honored the memory of the victims of the Paris terrorist attacks of fall 2015 in a national tribute, composing a hymn sung by young French star Louane. In 2021 he was chosen to play the national anthem in front of the Eiffel Tower in Paris, on 14 July 2021, the performance was broadcast on national TV for 6 million viewers.

In November 2022 he released his 16th studio album Capacity to Love, an urban music album, but above all a hymn to inclusion. The album includes artists such as Erick The Architect, leader of the Brooklyn-based rap group Flatbush Zombies, Tank and the Bangas, Cimafunk, Shelea Frazier, a protégé of Quincy Jones, the young Alemeda recently signed to TDE, Kendrick Lamar's label, D Smoke, winner of " Rhythm + Flow " the Netflix rap contest, the English singer JP Cooper, but also artists more identified in France such as the Californian crooner Gregory Porter, Pos of De La Soul; the mythical group of New York rap, the French star Matthieu Chédid, or the Franco-Brazilian Flavia Coelho. Among all these guests, Ibrahim Maalouf has also invited Sharon Stone to lay her voice on a powerful and committed track.

== Awards ==
Between 1999 and 2003, Maalouf earned awards in fifteen competitions throughout the world. These include first prize in the National Trumpet Competition (Washington D.C.) in 2001, first prize in the Hungarian International Trumpet Competition in Pilisvörösvár in May 2002, and second prize (ex aequo) in the Maurice André International Competition in Paris in 2003. In July 2010, he was given the Instrumental Revelation of the Year at the French Jazz Music Awards (Victoires du Jazz). He won Best World Music Artist at the French Music Awards in 2014. In 2017, at the César Awards, he won the Best Original Score award. In 2022, he became the first Lebanese instrumentalist nominated at the Grammy Awards for his album Queen of Sheba in collaboration with Angélique Kidjo and in 2023 he secured his second nomination at the Grammy Awards for his song Todo Colores in collaboration with Cimafunk and Tank & the Bangas from his latest album Capacity to Love.

== Honours ==
Ribbon bar	Country	Honour
	France	Knight of the National Order of Merit
	France	Officier of the Ordre des Arts et des Lettres

== Discography ==
=== Studio albums ===
Year	Album	Peak positions					Notes
Year	Album	FRA	BEL (Fl)	BEL (Wa)	NLD	SWI	Notes
2007	Diasporas	—	—	—	—	—	
2009	Diachronism	97	—	173	—	—	
2011	Diagnostic	84	—	—	—	—	
2012	Wind	57	74	128	17	—	
2013	Illusions	29	151	34	27	78	
2014	Au pays d'Alice... (joint album with Oxmo Puccino)	43	—	113	—	—	
2015	Red & Black Light	8	188	33	41	68	
2015	Kalthoum	17	160	54	21	95	
2017	Dalida	29	132	51	—	49	
2018	Levantine Symphony N°1	51	—	113	—	84	
2019	S3NS	16	—	53	88	—	
2020	40 mélodies	28	169	26	—	49	
2021	First Noel	18	—	73	—	40	
2022	Queen of Sheba	—	—	—	—	—	Nominated at the 2023 Grammy Awards
2022	Capacity to Love	35	—	118	—	—	Nominated at the 2024 Grammy Awards with Todo Colores for BEST GLOBAL MUSIC PERFORMANCE

=== Live albums ===
Year	Album	Peak positions		
Year	Album	FRA	BEL (Fl)	BEL (Wa)
2016	10 ans de live!	10	—	137
2016	Live Tracks 2006–2016	93	158	70

=== Singles ===
Year	Single	Peak positions	Album
Year	Single	FRA	Album
2014	"True Sorry"	57	Illusions
2015	"Red & Black Light"	101	Red & Black Light

=== Other songs ===
Year	Single	Peak positions	Album
Year	Single	FRA	Album
2017	"J'attendrai" (featuring Melody Gardot)	93	Dalida
2017	"Paroles, paroles" (featuring -M- and Monica Bellucci)	99	Dalida
2017	"Love in Portofino" (featuring Golshifteh Farahani)	181	Dalida
2017	"Laissez-moi danser" (featuring Izïa)	190	Dalida

=== Soundtracks ===
Year	Album	Peak positions		
Year	Album	FRA	BEL (Fl)	BEL (Wa)
2014	Yves Saint Laurent	78	147	125
2016	Dans Les Forets De Siberie	–	–	–
2017	Hikari			
2020	Une Belle Équipe	–	–	–
2021	9 jours à Raqqa			
2021	Ne pas laisser de traces			
2024	Finalement			

=== Guest appearance ===
- The Way Things Go - Laurent David (2011, alter-nativ)

== Productions ==
Year	Album	FR	BEL (Wa)	SWI	Certification
2013	Funambule (Grand Corps Malade, musical direction by Ibrahim Maalouf)	3	4	28	

== See also ==
- Maalouf
