= Kafarakab =

Kafarakab كفرعقاب
- Village
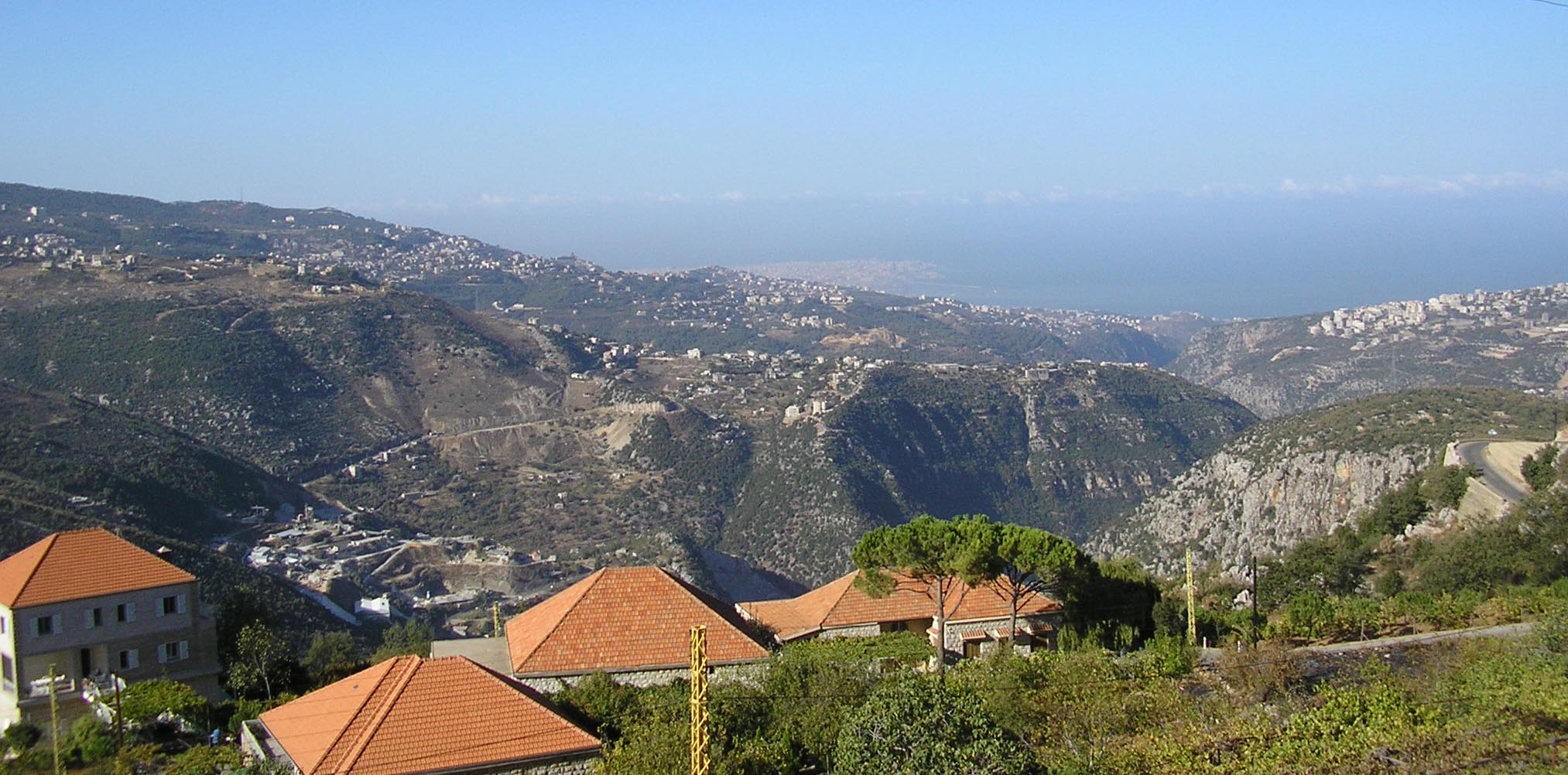
- View of Kfarakab

- Location within Lebanon
- Coordinates: 33°56′49″N 35°44′28″E
- Country: Lebanon
- Governorate: Mount Lebanon Governorate
- District: Matn District
- Elevation: 1,100 m (3,600 ft)
- Time zone: UTC+2 (EET)
  - Summer (DST): UTC+3 (EEST)
- Postal code: 4852
- Dialing code: +9614

Kafarakab (Arabic: كفرعقاب, romanized: Kfar ʿAqāb) (also spelled Kfarakab or Kfar Akab and pronounced "Kfara-ab" in Lebanese Arabic) is the francophone spelling of the name of a village in the mountains of Lebanon. In Arabic, it means the home (kfar: كفر) of the hawk (ʿaqāb: عقاب). The village, which is located in the Matn District of the Mount Lebanon Governorate, is of particular significance because it is one of the various historic points of origin of the Maalouf family. It was founded c. 1560 AD when three families of the Maalouf clan, living at the time across the valley in the village of Mhaydse, received permission from the ruling emir to establish the village. The family history is traced back to the beginnings of Christianity in the Middle East beginning with the Ghassanid tribe, which converted to Christianity nearly 2,000 years ago. The family name is now widespread worldwide.

The village is of no great size, consisting of only a few dozen old homes built on terraced mountainsides lined with grape vineyards and many varieties of fruit trees. The population swells during the summer as people leave the heat of the Lebanese coastline for the freshness of the mountains. Its weather is moderate, with temperatures ranging near 70 °F (21 °C) in the summer, and near 30 °F (−1 °C) in the winter season. Snowfall is common in the winter, with snow accumulations reaching 3 to 4 feet (0.91 to 1.22 meters).

The population follows the Christian faith, divided between Antiochian Eastern-Orthodox, Antiochian Oriental-Orthodox and Melkite. The local St. Mary church is separated into two halves, one for each faith. The scenic view is perhaps the most notable aspect of this red terra cotta rooftop cluster - including a view of the snow-capped Lebanon mountains to the east, and the Mediterranean sea and the city of Beirut to the west. The village sits at an elevation about 3,600 ft (1,100 m) just below the village of Baskinta and the towering Mount Sannine. Its distance to Beirut is approximately 40 km, or approximately 1 hour of driving. Its GPS coordinates are 33°56′49″N 35°44′28″E

From Kfarakab, the Maalouf clan migrated within Lebanon to Zahlé and Niha in the Bekaa Valley where it became one of the most prominent families in these villages. The migration continued in the late 1800s and 1900s to Brazil, the United States of America and Canada where the family prospered and has become known in many spheres of influence.

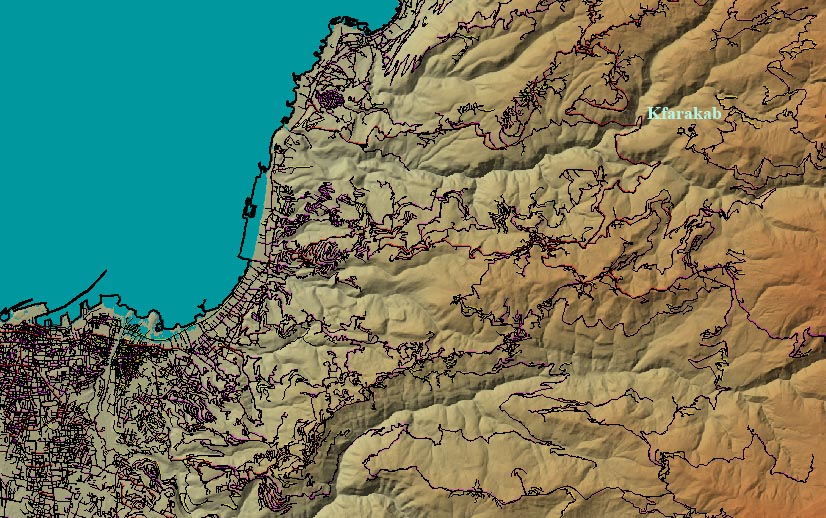
The location of Kfarakab

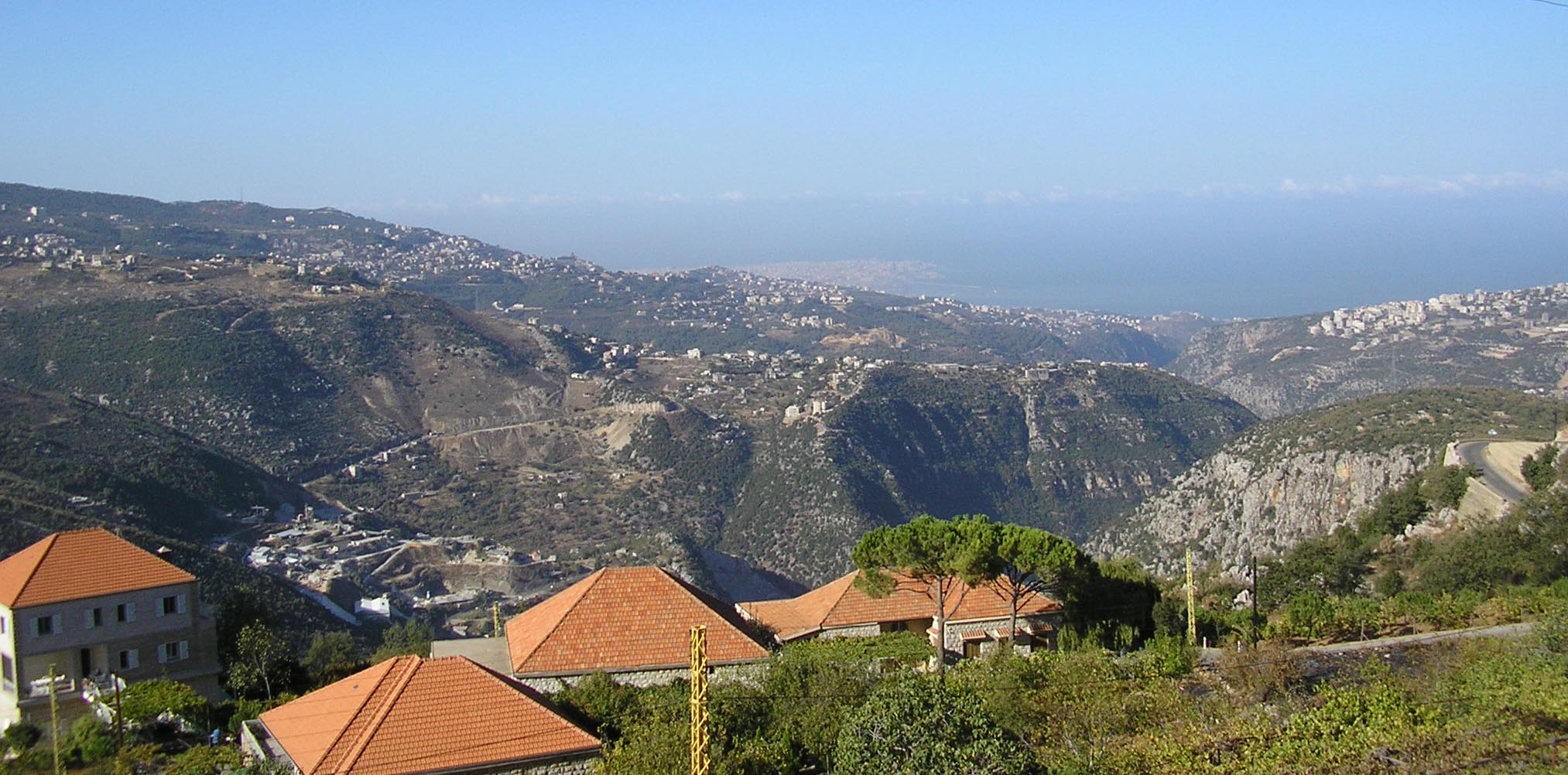
The view from Kfarakab

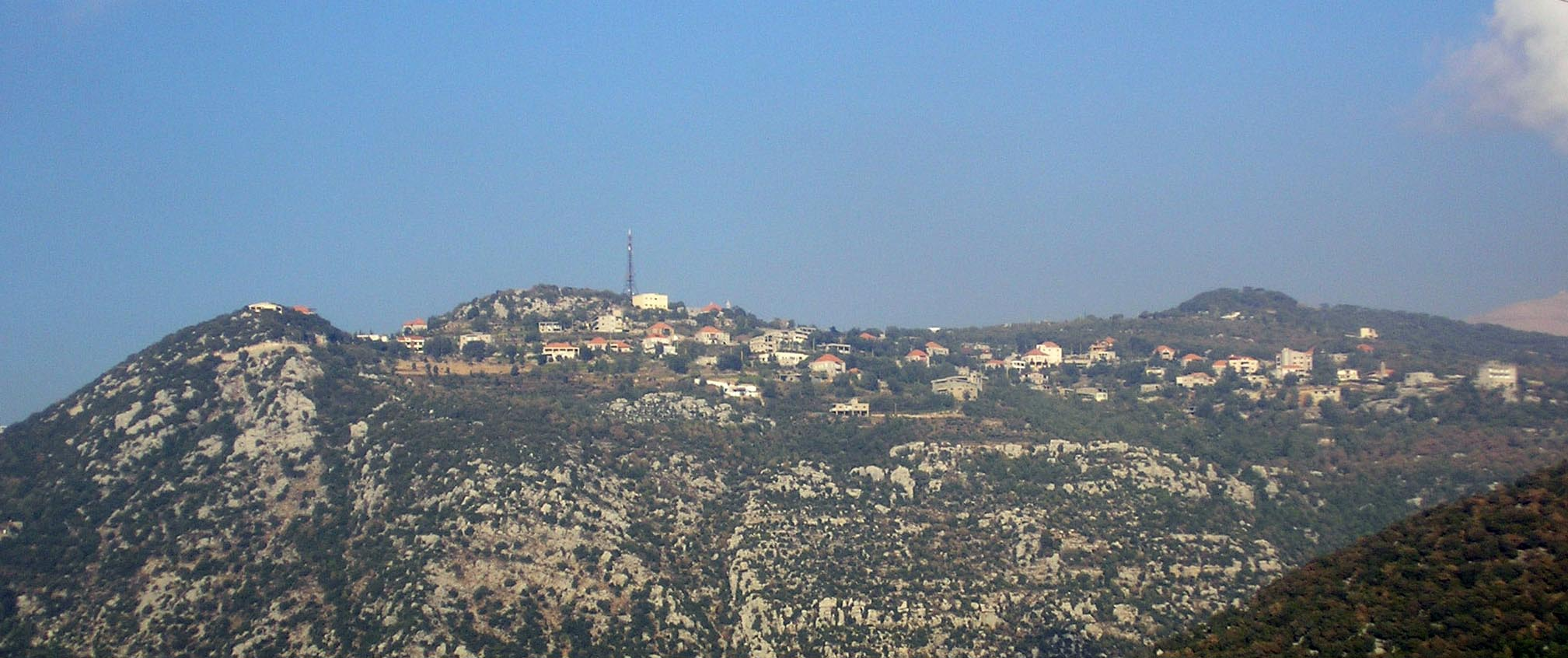
Kfarakab form Abou mizan

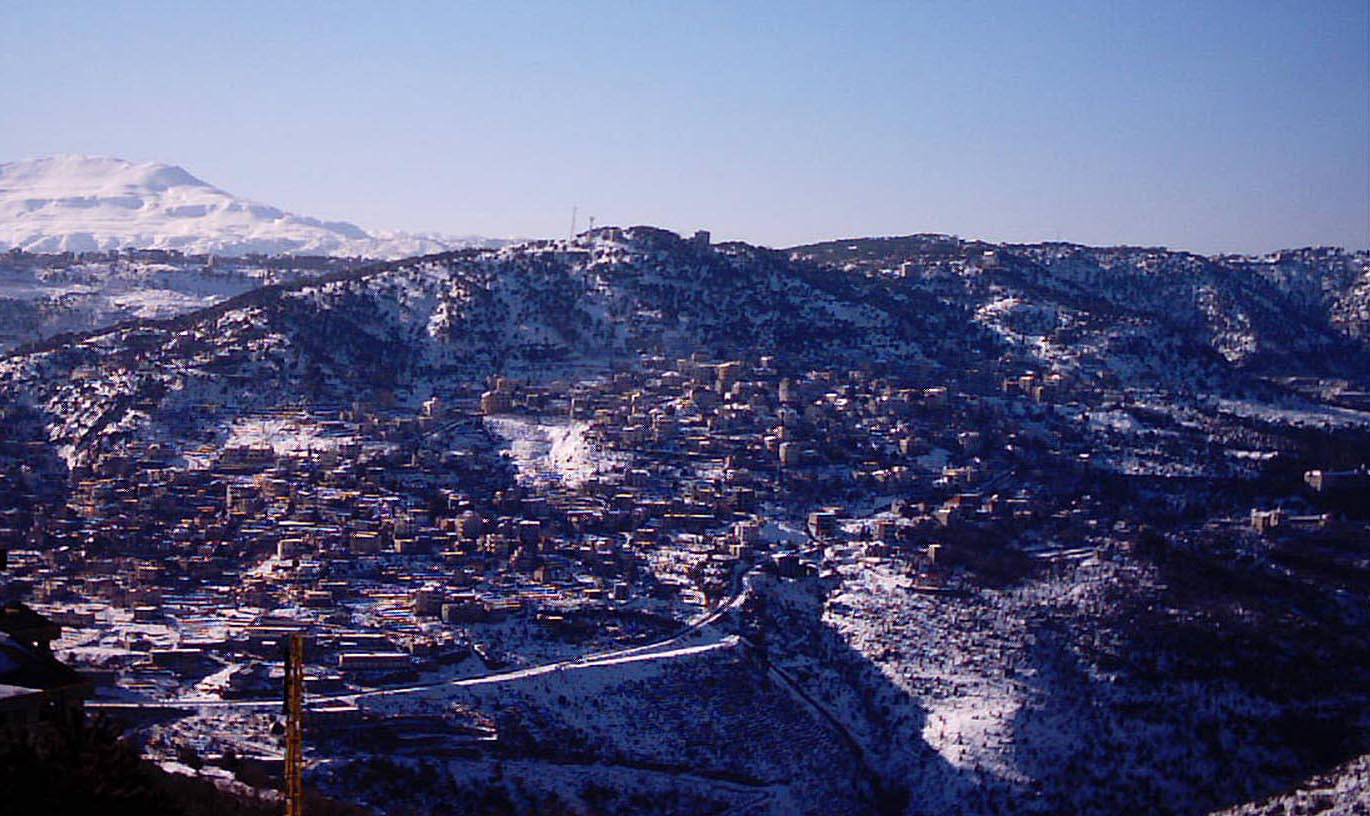
Snow view from kfarakab

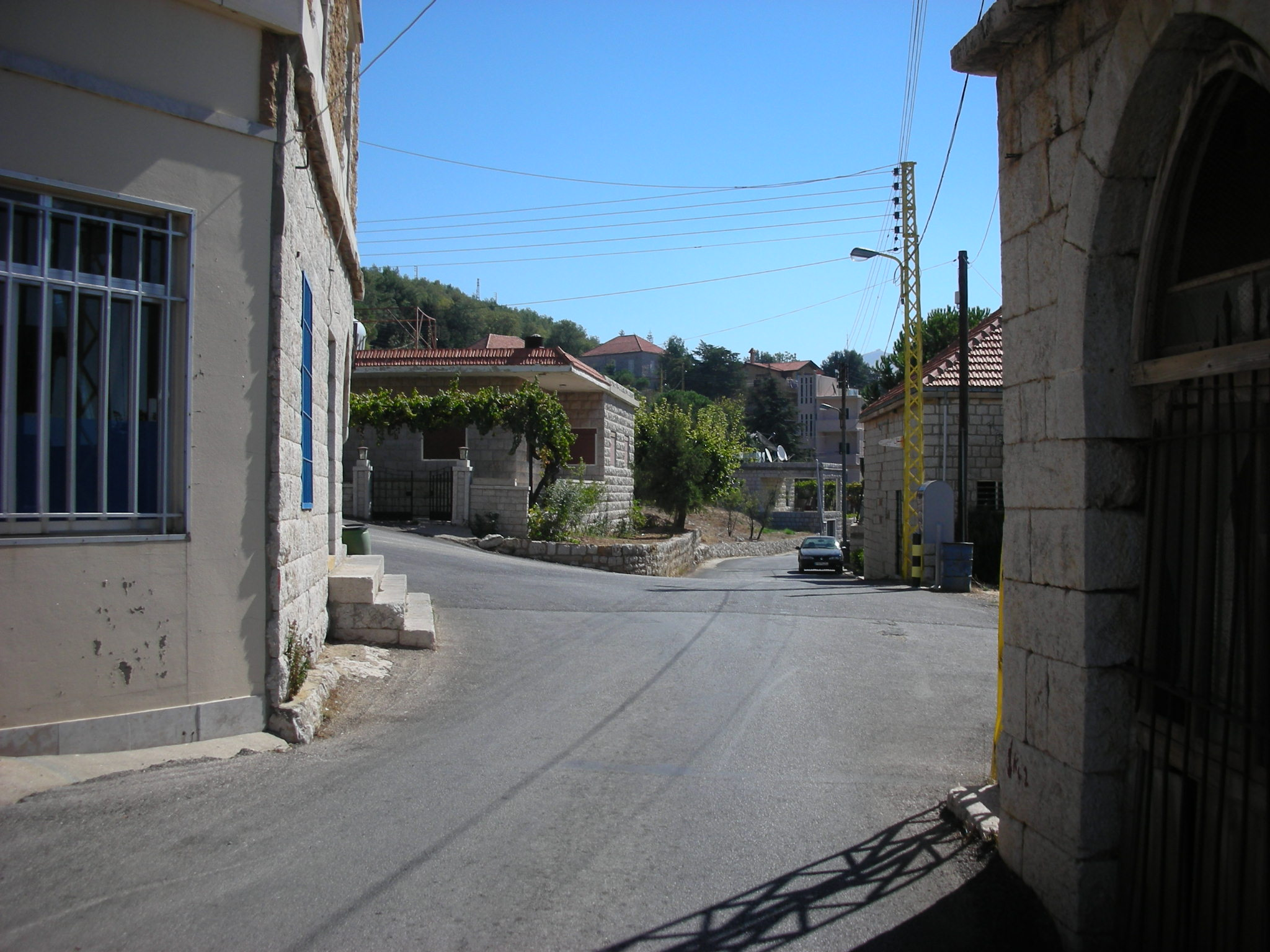
Kafarakab main street, Blata

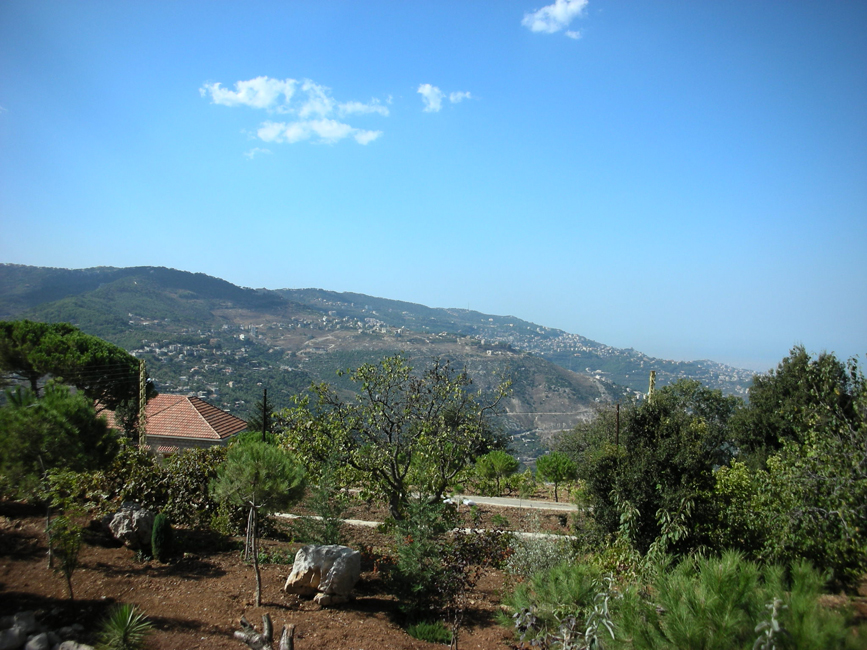
A view from Kafarakab

== Notable residents ==
- Fady Maalouf, German singer, born in Zahlé (lives now in Berlin)
- Nassim Maalouf, classical trumpeter, born in Kafarakab
- Nahim Malouf Abraham (1885-1965), businessman and community builder in Canadian, Texas
