= Sam and Alfreda Maloof Compound =

Historic house in California, United States

- U.S. National Register of Historic Places
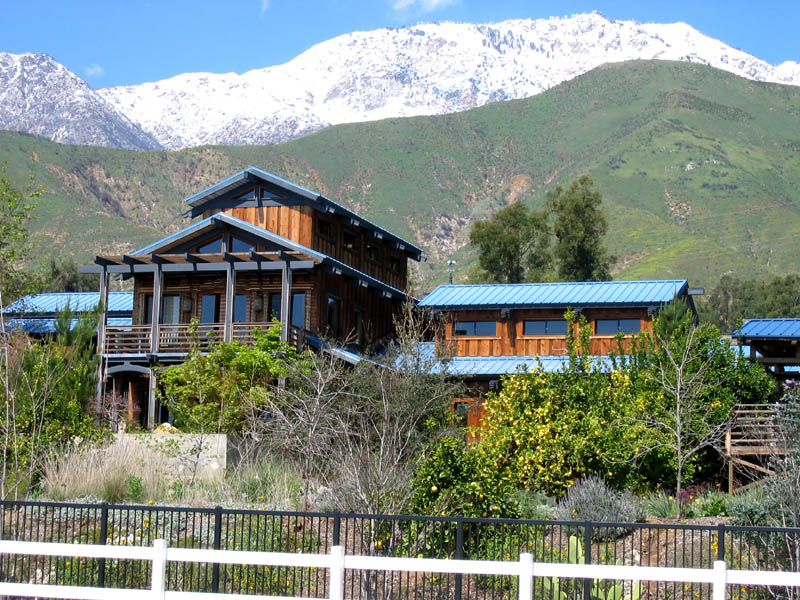

- Location within California Location within the United States
- Location: 5131 Carnelian St., Alta Loma, California
- Coordinates: 34°09′40″N 117°36′56″W
- Area: 5.5 acres (2.2 ha)
- Built: 1956
- Architect: Maloof, Sam
- Architectural style: Contemporary
- NRHP reference No.: 03000471
- Added to NRHP: November 9, 2010

The Sam and Alfreda Maloof Compound is a historic residential complex located at 5131 Carnelian Street in Alta Loma, California. The complex includes the house and workshop of woodworker and furniture designer Sam Maloof, who designed the buildings himself. Maloof's house includes hand-carved redwood doors and windows, which Maloof gradually carved to replace the pre-made fixtures. Maloof also replaced many of the house's functional elements with his own creations, including door handles and surrounds, rafters, and even toilet seats. Maloof used the adjacent workshop and display room to build and show his furniture, and he experienced his greatest period of success in the 1960s and 1970s while working in the house. The house was relocated in the early 2000s due to the construction of California State Route 210 through the area; it is now a museum of Arts and Crafts work.

The property was added to the National Register of Historic Places on November 9, 2010.
