= Nassim Maalouf =

Lebanese classical trumpeter (born 1941)

Nassim Maalouf (Arabic: نسيم معلوف) (born 1941 in Kafarakab, Lebanon) is a classical trumpet soloist particularly known for his adaptation of the trumpet to Arabic music with the introduction of quarter tones on the instrument.

== Family ==
Nassim Maalouf was born in 1941 in Kfarakab, a village in Mount Lebanon, Lebanon. He grew up in a rural family and received only a basic education, as his parents could not afford to keep him in school. His uncle later gave him an oud, which sparked his interest in music. At the age of 23, he discovered the trumpet while attending the National Conservatory of Music in Beirut. In 1964, he moved to Paris to pursue further musical studies.

He is a distant relative of Lebanese writer Amin Maalouf.

Maalouf's son, Ibrahim Maalouf, is a jazz trumpeter and composer.

== Career ==
Maalouf studied at the Conservatoire de Paris with the great French trumpeter Maurice André, graduating in 1970.

While he had by that time mastered the European classical trumpet repertoire he had for some time felt restricted by being able to play only in the major and minor scales. Although he wished to interpret the numerous Arabic modes (known as maqamat, singular maqam) on his instrument, he nevertheless found this quite difficult, as the necessary "half-sharps" and "half-flats" could only be obtained via the unreliable method of modulating lip pressure.

Finally, Maalouf realized that adding to his trumpet a fourth valve half the length of the second valve would allow for the production of quarter tones. Maalouf worked for two years with the craftsman Michel Wikrikaz of the Henri Selmer company in Paris to produce his design of a "quarter-tone" trumpet and flugelhorn, both suitable for performing Arabic maqamat throughout the full chromatic range of the instrument.

Maalouf uses his right hand to play the first three valves and the index finger of his left hand to depress the fourth valve. Maalouf's quarter-tone trumpet was not the first such instrument, however; the American jazz trumpeter Don Ellis and others had earlier created similar instruments.

In addition to his career as trumpet soloist, Maalouf has also taught at the National Conservatory in Beirut. Maalouf's son, Ibrahim Maalouf (b. 1980), is also a classically trained trumpeter and plays the quarter-tone trumpet.

Maalouf has released a solo CD, Improvisations Orientales (1994), on the Club Du Disque Arabe label.
