= Maria Maalouf =

Lebanese journalist

- Born: 1974 (age 51–52); Zahlé, Lebanon
- Occupations: Journalist, Broadcaster, Publisher, Press Writer, Ambassador for Peace in the Middle East from the Kingdom of Norway and Political Analyst
- Known for: “Bila Rakib” on New TV

Maria Maalouf (or Maria Maaloof, Arabic: ماريا معلوف) is a Lebanese Christian-Maronite journalist broadcaster, publisher and writer known for her controversial stances against Hezbollah and the Syrian regime. In March 2017, Maalouf garnered attention after publicly calling on Israel to murder Hezbollah secretary-general Hassan Nasrallah on her Twitter account. She was subsequently charged and brought in for questioning under sedition charges In return, she sued Nasrallah on murder and rape charges.

Maalouf lives in political exile in the United States. She was interviewed by Israeli television channel Kan in 2021, being the first Lebanese to be hosted on air by an Israeli TV station.

== Biography ==
Maalouf was born in 1974 in Zahle, Lebanon, in the well-known Maalouf Family. After finishing her secondary studies at the Congregation of the Maronite Sisters of the Holy Family, she joined the Faculty of Social Sciences at the Lebanese University. Maalouf holds an MA in Political Sociology from the University of Lyon.

== Work ==
Maalouf created and presented the political program Bila Rakib (بلا رقيب) on the Lebanese news channel New TV, as well as With Maria Maalouf (مع ماريا معلوف) on NBN. In addition, she presented an Arab political program on the Egyptian El Mehwar TV, and now hosts a program on Hawas TV channel and vision TV show on Saudi 24.

She is the owner of Dar Al Khaleej Printing and Publishing, which publishes The Gulf Mirror (Meraat Al Khalij), an economic, social and cultural magazine, as well as Banko, a magazine concerned with banks and other media and advertising activities.

Maalouf was the editor-in-chief and owner of the pan-Arab news website and newspaper Al-Rowad (الرواد), which was first issued in 1932 and has been issued weekly since 2011. She is also presenting her program Lel-Rouwad Faqat on the YouTube channel Al-Rouwad Web TV.

She was the last journalist to have met President Yasser Arafat before his death.

She was the first Lebanese journalist to have met with President Obama after his election.

== Interviews ==
Maalouf has interviewed a number of Arab and international personalities, such as the president of Bosnia and Herzegovina Bakir Izetbegović, former United States Secretary of State Madeleine Albright, American thinker Francis Fukuyama, and United States National Security Advisor Zbigniew Brzezinski. Moreover, she hosted President Amin Gemayel and former Lebanese Minister of Justice Ibrahim Najjar on her program Lel-Rouwad Faqat. The program also hosted many political and economic figures from the United Arab Emirates, as well as the Governor of the state of Maryland, the Mayor of Baltimore, the Vice President of the Iraqi Council of Ministers, Dr. Tariq al-Hashimi, and former Prime Minister of Iraq, Dr. Ayad Allawi.

== Works ==
- A Woman Looking for a Home
- The Political History of the Hrawis
- The Tunisian Woman

== Television programs ==
- El Mehwar TV Network and El Mehwar FM Network – With Maria Maalouf
- Al Moutawasset TV – Bila Rakib
- NBN Network – With Maria Maalouf
- New TV Network – Bila Rakib pionners Hawas tv vision Saudi 24 TV
