= Maluf =

Maluf may refer to:

- Maloof (Arabic:معلوف ), the family surname written as Maalouf (with alternate spellings: Maloof, Malouf, Maluf; Malluf)
- Paulo Maluf (born 1931), Brazilian politician
- Ma'luf, genre of art music
- Camila Maluf, Brazilian volleyball player
- Luana Maluf, Brazilian sports journalist, presenter, and content creator

== See also ==
- Maalouf
