= Sam Maloof =

American furniture creator and woodworker

- Born: January 24, 1916; Chino, California, U.S.
- Died: May 21, 2009 (aged 93); Alta Loma, California, U.S.
- Occupation: Woodworker
- Spouses: Alfreda Louise Ward (m. 1948–1998; her death); Beverly Wingate Maloof (m. 2001–2009; his death)
- Children: 3

Sam Maloof rocker

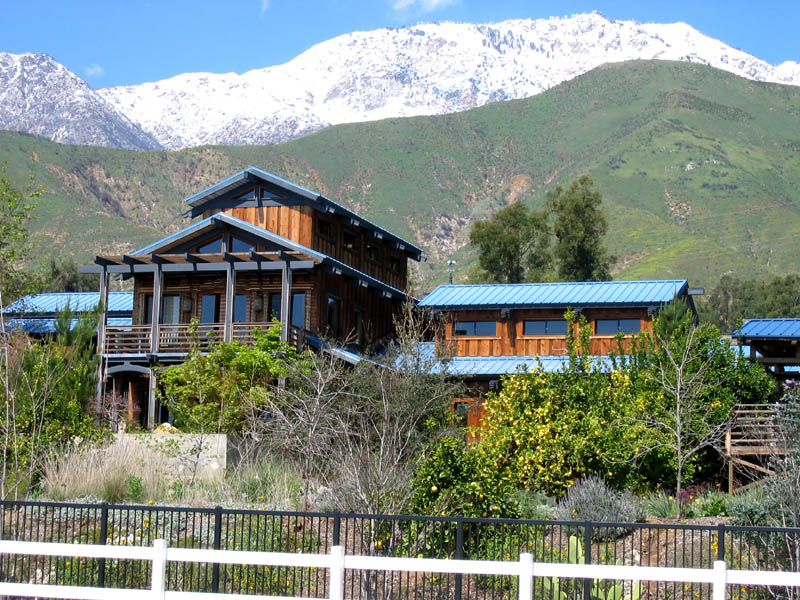
The street-side view of the Sam Maloof house

The rear of the Sam Maloof site showing the roofs of his shops and museum. Note the roof lines.

Sam Maloof (January 24, 1916 – May 21, 2009) was an American furniture designer and woodworker. Maloof's work is in the collections of several major American museums, including the Metropolitan Museum of Art, the Los Angeles County Museum of Art, the Philadelphia Museum of Art, and the Smithsonian American Art Museum. Maloof, the first craftsman to receive a MacArthur fellowship, was described by The New York Times as "a central figure in the postwar American crafts movement".

== Early life and education ==
Maloof was born Samuel Solomon Maloof, a member of the large Maalouf family, in Chino, California, to Lebanese immigrants. Maloof's father, Slimen Nasif Nadir Maloof, and mother, Anisse, had immigrated to the U.S. in 1905 from Lebanon, which was at that time a region of the Ottoman Empire. Maloof learned to speak Spanish from a Mexican-born housekeeper and Arabic from his parents even before he learned English. He was engaged in woodworking even as a child, made a broad spatula for his mother for turning bread, and carved dollhouse furniture, cars, and other toys. He attended high school first at Chaffey High School in Ontario, California, where he took his first woodworking class and was recognized by his art teacher as having extraordinary skill. Later he attended Chino High School.

== Career ==
Shortly after completing high school, Maloof began working in the art department of the Vortox Manufacturing Company in Claremont, California. He was drafted into the United States Army on October 11, 1941. Maloof was soon promoted from private to master sergeant while performing display work in Alaska. He was one of 35,000 WWII troops sent to protect Alaska from the Japanese, an engagement the Allies expected to be a "bloodbath." In actuality, the Japanese forces had left Kiska before the Allies arrived. Maloof was one of the few soldiers who had a camera, and while not trained as a photographer, Maloof took 1,800 photographs which were "alive and clear and informative."

After completing military service, Maloof left the army in 1945 to return to Southern California. In 1946, Maloof became reacquainted with Millard Sheets while he was screen printing for Angelus-Pacific. Sheets invited Maloof to come to Claremont, California, to work for him as his studio assistant.

In 1947, while waiting for Millard Sheets at Scripps College, Maloof met Alfreda Ward. Ward was on leave from her job at the Indian Service where she developed and administered arts and crafts programs. It was love at first sight.

Maloof married Alfreda Ward on June 27, 1948, and the couple moved into a house at 921 Plaza Serena, Ontario, California, where Sam set up a furniture workshop in the garage. Mostly from necessity, Maloof designed and built a suite of furniture for his home using salvaged materials. Commissioned pieces followed and, from 1949 to 1952, Maloof continued working in the garage of his Ontario home. In 1953, Maloof relocated to Alta Loma, California. Over time, he added 16 rooms, including a furniture-making shop and studio, to the original 6-room house. In 2000, when the path of the new CA-210 freeway extension included the Maloof property, the home was moved about 3 miles to its current location at 5131 Carnelian Street (at the northeast corner of the intersection with Hidden Farm Road; 34.1612°N 117.6157°W). The Sam and Alfreda Maloof Compound serves as the office of the Sam and Alfreda Maloof Foundation for Arts and Crafts which offers tours of the Historic Home on Thursdays and Saturdays.

President Jimmy Carter came to his home and signed a photograph that said, "to my woodworking hero." The White House has several of the rocking chairs Maloof designed.

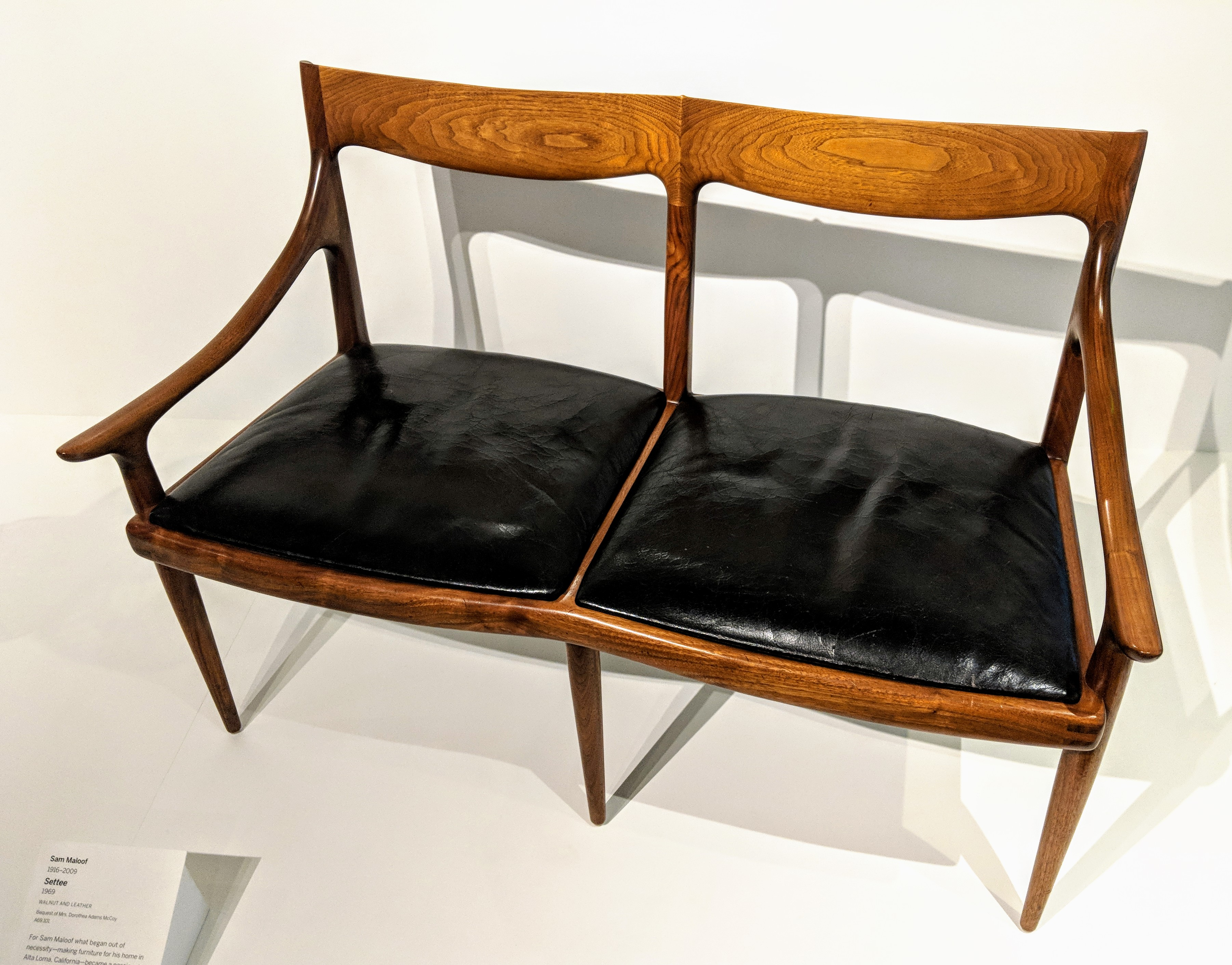
A walnut and leather settee on display at the Oakland Museum of California

Maloof's work is in the collections of several major American museums, including the Metropolitan Museum of Art, the Los Angeles County Museum of Art, the Philadelphia Museum of Art, and the Smithsonian American Art Museum. In 1985 he was awarded a MacArthur "Genius" grant. Presidents Jimmy Carter and Ronald Reagan have both owned Maloof rockers. He is featured in the 2007 PBS series "Craft in America: Memory, Landscape, Community", produced by Carol Sauvion.

Maloof's chairs, for which he is perhaps most famous, have a sculptural quality about them, yet are also ergonomic, and austere in their simplicity. They can be characterized by rounded corners at mortise and tenon joints (which are always plainly visible); carved ridges and spines, particularly on the arm rests; decorative Ebony dowels; deep, dished-out seats (always made from several boards glued together); and clear finishes.

Maloof tended to favor a handful of woods: Claro Walnut, Cherry, Oak, Rosewood and Yew. On larger pieces, he often used Poplar in areas that would not be visible during ordinary use.

He was described by the Smithsonian Institution as "America's most renowned contemporary furniture craftsman" and People magazine dubbed him "The Hemingway of Hardwood." His business card merely said "woodworker." "I like the word," he told a Los Angeles Times reporter, his eyes brightening behind large, owl-eyed glass frames. "It's an honest word."

In 1985 Mr. Maloof became the first craftsman to receive a MacArthur fellowship; and despite such recognition, he declined to identify himself as an artist. His autobiography was titled Sam Maloof: Woodworker.

== Death ==
Maloof died at the age of 93 on May 21, 2009, at his home in the Alta Loma section of Rancho Cucamonga, California.
