= Maloof Productions =

American entertainment company

Maloof Productions is an American entertainment development and production company formed by the Maloof family, led by Chairman and CEO Phil Maloof and President Andrew Jameson, focuses on film, television, and music.

== Maloof Television ==
The company's television division, Maloof Television, is perhaps best known for producing Living Lohan, a primetime reality series that aired in summer 2008 on E!. The division also produced the reality series Bullrun in 2007 for Spike TV and in 2009 for SpeedChannel. Along with George Clooney and Steven Soderbergh, the division also produced a HBO comedy pilot focusing on a fictional NBA team in 2007 and is developing the reality series Rebuilding the Kingdom with producer Mark Burnett as of 2008.

== Maloof Motion Pictures ==
Maloof Motion Pictures, the company’s film division, produced Dimension Film's Feast in conjunction with Ben Affleck, Matt Damon and Wes Craven. The film was released theatrically in September 2006 and was named a "Must-See" film for Fall by Entertainment Weekly. The division is currently at work on its next project, The Big Biazarro, a drama based on the Leonard Wise novel, to star Pierce Brosnan, from a script by Vondie Curtis-Hall.

In addition to film and television production, Maloof Productions spearheads the entertainment outreach for the Maloof properties. The company brokered partnerships with 20th Century Fox, Columbia Pictures and Dimension Films for the world premieres of Elektra, Deuce Bigalo: European Gigalo and Feast respectively at the Palms Casino Resort. It was also instrumental in integrating Maloof Music artist Narwhal into both the Feast soundtrack and the film itself.

== Malpoof Music ==
Records put out by Malpoof Productions get distributed through David Geffen's Interscope label.

== See also ==
- Maloof Family
