= List of The Wildlands Conservancy preserves =

The Wildlands Conservancy operates 24 preserves, containing over 200,000 acres (81,000 ha) in the western United States.

The Wildlands Conservancy preserves
The Wildlands Conservancy preserves

Summary by state (Note: All data are from The Wildlands Conservancy’s official webpages and publications unless otherwise noted.)
State	Count	Size	
State	Count	acres	ha
California	22	197,583	79,959
Oregon	1	14,000	5,700
Utah	1	415	168
Total	24	211,998	85,793

== Preserves ==
Preserves operated by The Wildlands Conservancy (Note: All data are from The Wildlands Conservancy’s official webpages and publications unless otherwise noted.)
Name	Image	State	Size		Established	Website
Name	Image	State	acres	ha	Established	Website
Bearpaw Reserve		California	600	240	1996	site
Beaver Valley Headwaters Preserve		California	6,094	2,466	2021	site
Bluff Lake Reserve		California	80	32	2000	site
Eel River Canyon Preserve		California	26,600	10,800	2021	site
Eel River Estuary Preserve		California	1,100	450	2008	site
Emerald Waters Reserve		California	3,019	1,222	2019	site
Enchanted Rocks Preserve		Oregon	14,000	5,700	2022	site
Estero Americano Coast Preserve		California	547	221	2016	site
Galena Peak Wilderness Reserve		California	1,280	520	2018	site
Jenner Headlands Preserve		California	5,630	2,280	2009	site
Mariposa Reserve		California	897	363	2005	site
Mission Creek Preserve		California	4,760	1,930	1997	site
Oak Glen Preserve		California	909	368	1996	site
Pioneertown Mountains Preserve		California	25,500	10,300	1995	site
Rana Creek Preserve		California	14,142	5,723	2023	site
Santa Margarita River Trail Preserve		California	1,384	560	2018	site
Seawood Cape Preserve		California	128	52	2019	site
Sounding Seas Dunes Reserve		California	80	32	2009	site
Speaking Springs Preserve		Utah	415	168	2023	site
Spyrock Reserve		California	5,832	2,360	2005	site
Two Rivers Preserve		California	2,480	1,000	2015	site
West Walker River Preserve		California	89	36	2019	site
Whitewater Preserve		California	2,851	1,154	2005	site
Wind Wolves Preserve		California	93,000	38,000	1996	site

== Works ==
- The Wildlands Conservancy (December 28, 2012). Behold the Beauty (1st ed.). The Wildlands Conservancy. ISBN 978-0988819702.
- The Wildlands Conservancy (2021). Behold the Beauty (2nd ed.). The Wildlands Conservancy.

== See also ==
- The Wildlands Conservancy
- List of ecoregions in the United States (WWF)
