= Bearpaw Reserve =

Nature preserve in San Bernardino County, California

- IUCN category V (protected landscape/seascape)
- Location within California
- Interactive map of Bearpaw Reserve
- Location: San Bernardino County, California
- Nearest city: Yucaipa
- Coordinates: 34.09071°N 116.96750°W
- Area: 600 acres (240 ha)
- Max. elevation: 6,000 ft (1,800 m)
- Min. elevation: 4,500 ft (1,400 m)
- Established: 1996
- Operator: The Wildlands Conservancy
- Website: Bearpaw Reserve

Bearpaw Reserve is a nature preserve on the north-facing slopes of the Yucaipa Ridge in the San Bernardino Mountains. Conifer and oak woodlands support wildlife such as flying squirrels and the southern spotted owl. Columbine Falls is a seasonal waterfall about 110 feet (34 m) high. The 600 acres (240 ha) property is owned and managed by The Wildlands Conservancy as part of its system of preserves.

== Geography ==
The site ranges from 4,500 feet (1,400 m) to 6,000 feet (1,800 m) in elevation on the north slope of the Yucaipa Ridge. It is largely surrounded by the San Bernardino National Forest and lies near Allen Peak and Birch Mountain. Columbine Falls is located within the tract. The San Bernardino Valley Audubon Society’s Bearpaw Sanctuary adjoins the property.

== Flora and fauna ==
Habitats include mixed conifer forests of incense cedar, ponderosa pine, and coulter pine, along with chaparral and oak woodlands. A rare hybrid of black oak and interior live oak, sometimes called the oracle oak, occurs in the area. Wildlife recorded on the land include black bears, flying squirrels, and the southern spotted owl.

== History ==
The property was donated to The Wildlands Conservancy in 1996.

In September 2020 the El Dorado Fire burned through parts of Bearpaw, damaging understory vegetation. Studies analyzed fire impacts in the Mill Creek watershed, including UAV surveys, multispectral imagery, and ecological succession research.

== Conservation ==
In 2022, a tree-planting and restoration project at Bearpaw was filed through the California Environmental Quality Act process.

== Recreation ==
Public access is limited. The Columbine Falls Group Campground offers group camping for community organizations, schools, and universities. Individual or family camping is not available.

== See also ==
- List of The Wildlands Conservancy preserves
- Oak Glen Preserve
