= Beaver Valley Headwaters Preserve =

Nature preserve in Siskiyou County, California

- IUCN category V (protected landscape/seascape)
- Location within California
- Interactive map of Beaver Valley Headwaters Preserve
- Location: Siskiyou County, California
- Nearest city: Callahan, California
- Coordinates: 41°19′17″N 122°46′58″W
- Area: 6,094 acres (2,466 ha)
- Max. elevation: 5,538 ft (1,688 m)
- Min. elevation: 3,180 ft (970 m)
- Established: 2021
- Operator: The Wildlands Conservancy
- Website: Beaver Valley Headwaters Preserve

Beaver Valley Headwaters Preserve is a nature preserve in northern California that protects a section of the East Fork Scott River, part of its watershed, and the summit of Hayden Ridge. The 6,094 acres (2,466 ha) preserve includes riparian forests, meadows, and grasslands. Conservation efforts emphasize improving river flows and fisheries habitat. The property is owned and managed by The Wildlands Conservancy as part of its system of preserves.

== Geography ==
The preserve encompasses 2.5 miles (4.0 km) of the East Fork Scott River within the Scott Valley, historically called Beaver Valley by Hudson's Bay Company fur trappers. It contains a mosaic of habitats including conifer and willow riparian forests, grasslands, and wetland meadows. Elevations range from 3,180 feet (970 m) to 5,538 feet (1,688 m) at Hayden Ridge, which forms the boundary between Scott Valley and Noyes Valley. Within about one mile of river frontage, three tributaries enter the East Fork: Noyes Valley Creek, Mule Creek, and Big Mill Creek.

With private donations and a large grant from the state of California, the Wildlands Conservancy announced in August 2026 that it was acquiring the AP Ranch, adding an adjacent 8.0 miles (12.9 km) of East Fork Scott River and adding 14,177 acres (57.37 km^{2}) to the existing 6,000 acres (24 km^{2}) property.

== Flora and fauna ==
The East Fork Scott River and its tributaries provide habitat for federally threatened Southern Oregon / Northern California Coast (SONCC) coho salmon evolutionarily significant unit (ESU) {Oncorhynchus kisutch), as well as not federally listed Upper Klamath and Trinity River (UKTR) Chinook salmon fall- and spring-run chinook salmon ESU (Oncorhynchus tshawytscha), and Klamath Mountains Province (KMP) steelhead distinct population segment (DPS) (Oncorhynchus mykiss)

Roosevelt elk (Cervus canadensis roosevelti),have been observed in the area, which lies within the mapped home range of the species.

The wetlands and riparian forests also support diverse species dependent on aquatic and meadow ecosystems.

== History ==
In 1836, Hudson Bay Company trappers entered Beaver Valley and heavily reduced the beaver population. The loss of beaver dams altered stream hydrology, reducing the impounded water needed for salmonid rearing. The Wildlands Conservancy acquired the property in 2021, with the Trust for Public Land helping to facilitate the transaction.

== Conservation ==
Conservation efforts focus on the recovery of salmon and steelhead habitat in the East Fork Scott River and its tributaries including Noyes Valley Creek, Mule Creek, and Big Mill Creek.

This is part of wider efforts across the Scott River basin to counter the legacy of mining tailings and seasonal low flows that restrict fish passage. Restoration efforts are intended to increase summer baseflows and support salmon and steelhead populations.

== Recreation ==
The preserve is closed to the public, but future plans call for public access. Fishing is prohibited under California Department of Fish and Wildlife regulations due to the imperiled condition of local fish populations.

== Works ==
In 2023, California Trout released a short film, Transforming the Beaver Valley Headwaters Preserve, featuring aerial footage of the property and interviews with partners including The Wildlands Conservancy, Scott River Watershed Council, and California Trout.

== See also ==
- List of The Wildlands Conservancy preserves
