= Eel River Estuary Preserve =

Nature preserve in Humboldt County, California

- IUCN category V (protected landscape/seascape)
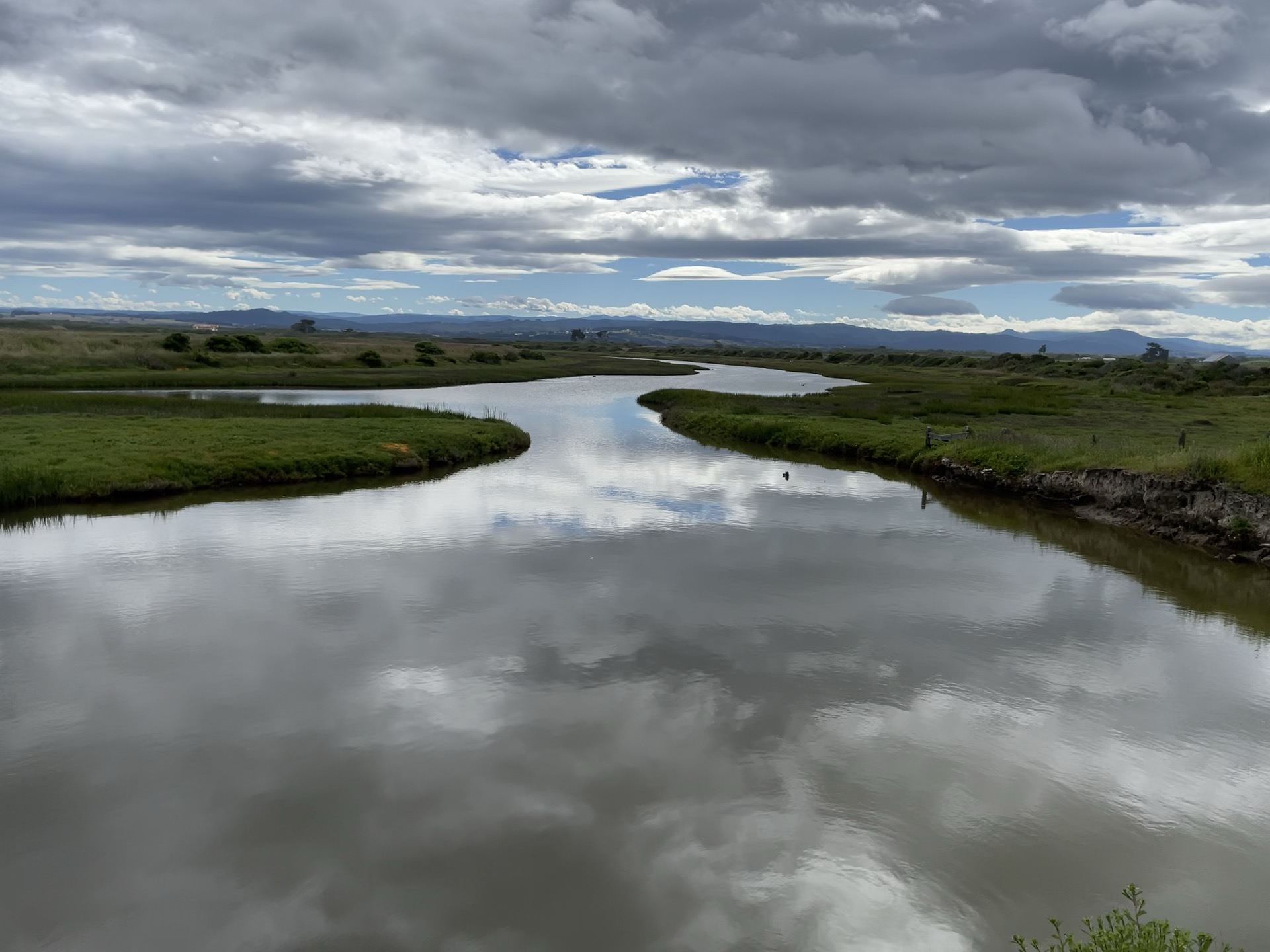
- Eel River Estuary channel

- Location within California
- Interactive map of Eel River Estuary Preserve
- Location: Humboldt County, California
- Nearest city: Fortuna, California
- Coordinates: 40°37′39″N 124°18′59″W
- Area: 1,100 acres (450 ha)
- Max. elevation: 30 ft (9.1 m)
- Min. elevation: 0 ft (0 m)
- Established: 2008
- Operator: The Wildlands Conservancy
- Website: Eel River Estuary Preserve

Eel River Estuary Preserve and the adjoining Sounding Seas Dunes Reserve are nature preserves in California, protecting the estuary at the mouth of the Eel River together with surrounding wetlands, dunes, and shoreline habitats. Together the preserves total 1,300 acres (530 ha) and are owned and managed by The Wildlands Conservancy as part of its system of preserves.

== Geography ==
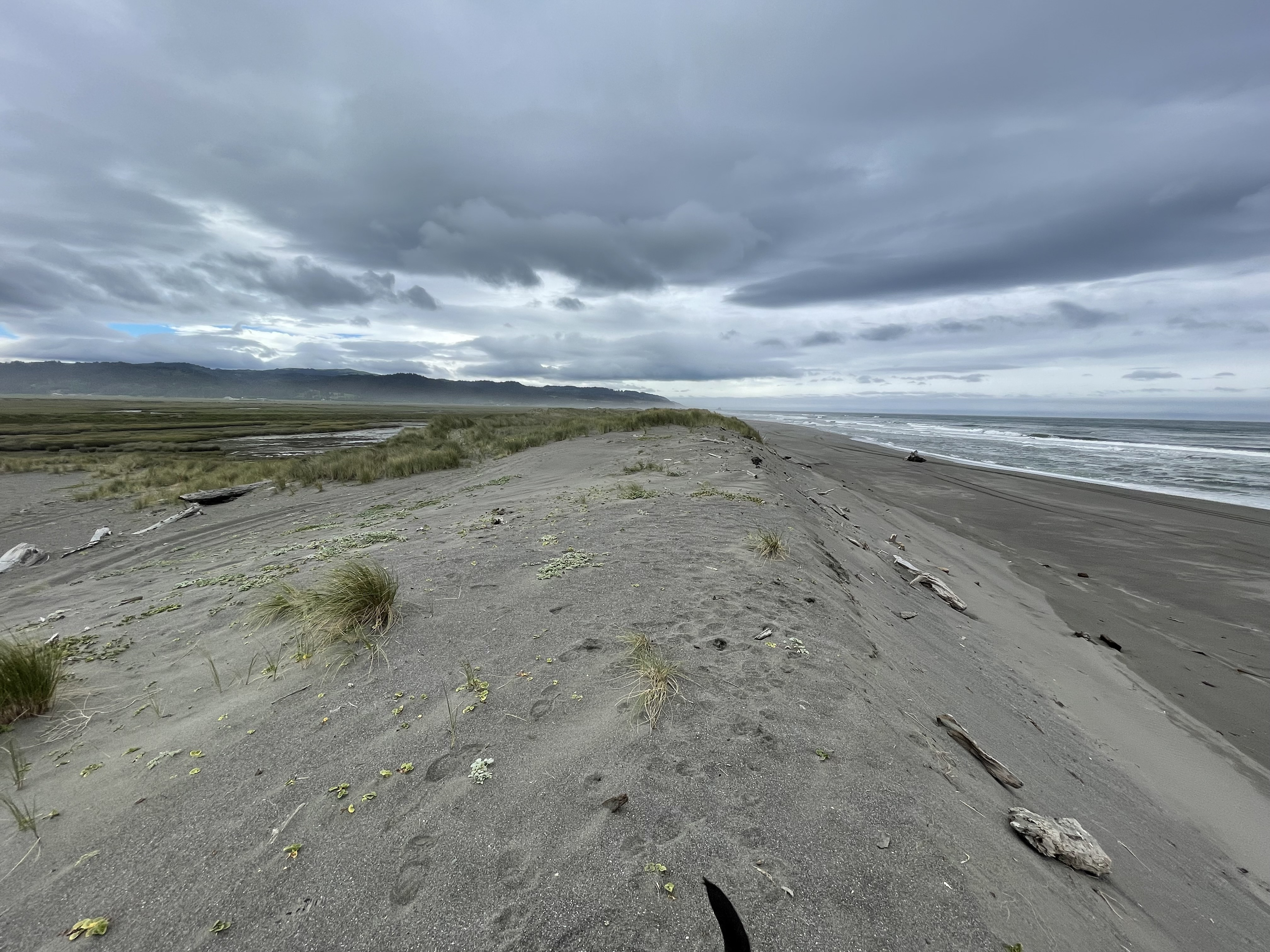
Sounding Seas Dunes ridge

The preserves are located at the mouth of the Eel River and include tidal wetlands, freshwater marsh, grasslands, beach, and coastal dunes. The landscape includes a half-moon bay, coastal habitat used by migratory waterfowl, and a small island that serves as a haul-out site for seals. The preserve landscape transitions from estuary wetlands to coastal dunes and the Pacific Ocean.

== Flora and fauna ==
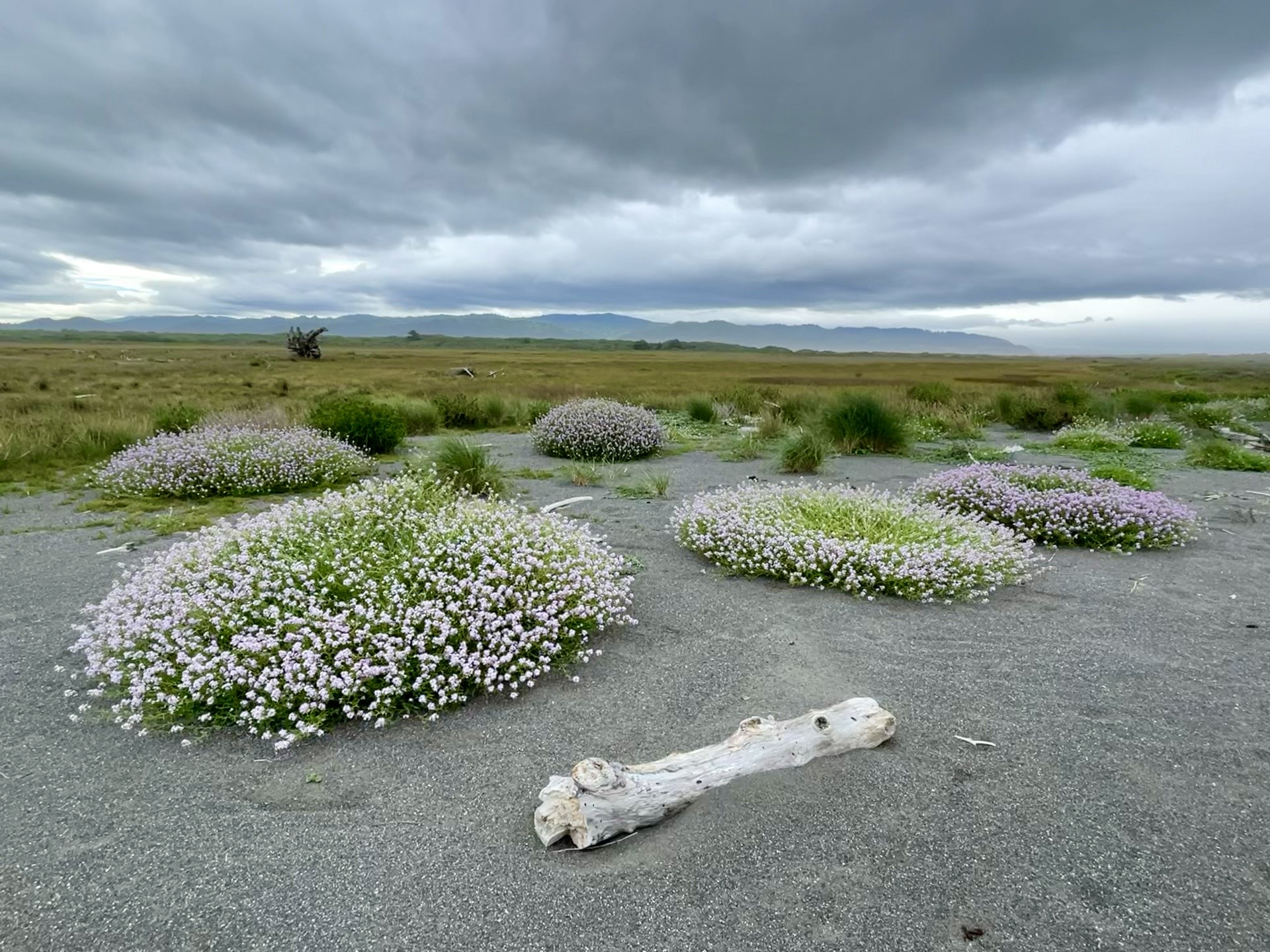
Spring wildflowers in coastal dunes

The Eel River estuary includes tidal marshes, freshwater wetlands, grasslands, dunes, intertidal flats, and eelgrass beds. The estuary provides rearing habitat for juvenile salmonids, including Chinook salmon, coho salmon, and steelhead trout. Juvenile Chinook occur at high densities during summer months.

The dunes provide habitat for the federally listed snowy plover and the rare beach layia.

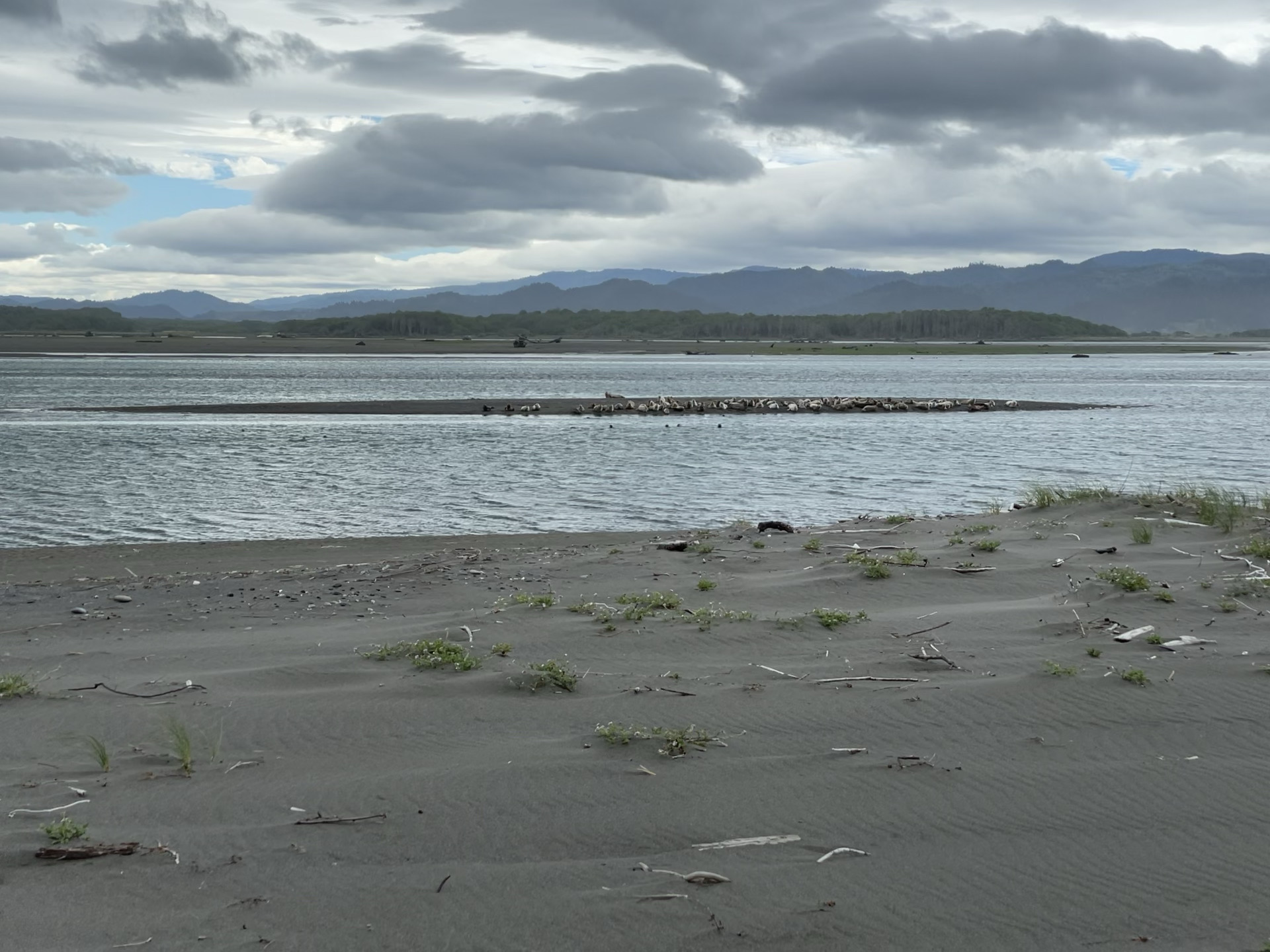
Seals on estuary island

The estuary lies within the Eel River Delta and the Humboldt Bay Important Bird Area, designated by the National Audubon Society.

The Pacific Birds Habitat Joint Venture describes Humboldt Bay, the Eel River Delta, and Lake Earl as the largest coastal wetlands between San Francisco Bay and the Columbia River. The mouth of the Eel River is designated as a site of International Importance under the Western Hemisphere Shorebird Reserve Network. Species reported in the estuary include Aleutian cackling geese, black brant, and tundra swans. Tundra swans winter regularly in the estuary as part of the Pacific Flyway.

Marine mammals are present in the estuary. Harbor seals regularly use haul-out sites near the river mouth. Sea lions, dolphins, and porpoises occasionally enter the estuary during seasonal fish runs.

== History ==
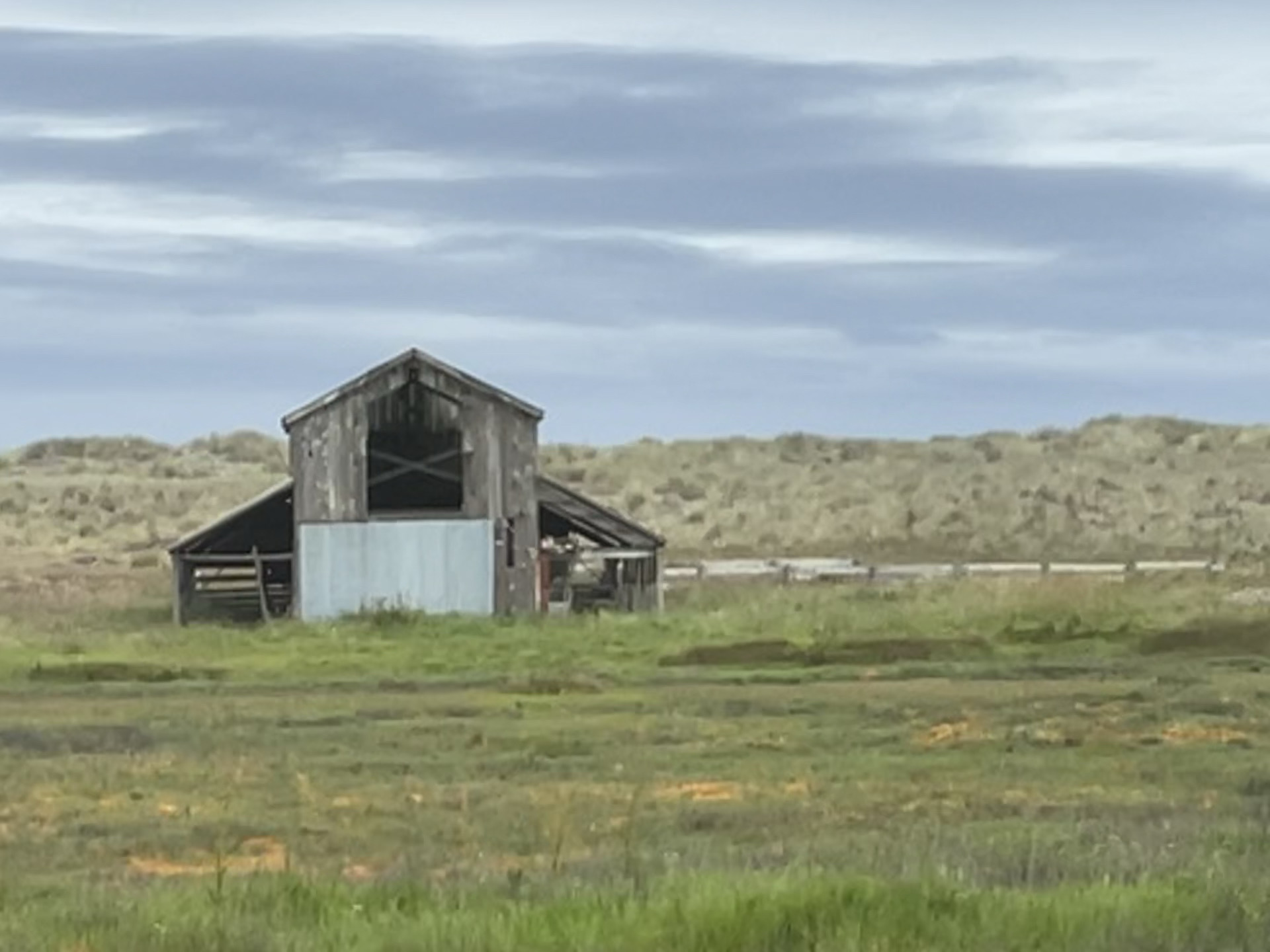
Connick Ranch barn

Beginning in the late 19th century, much of the estuary was diked, drained, and converted to agricultural pastureland, reducing tidal wetlands and narrowing Centerville Slough. In 1974, the California Department of Fish and Wildlife identified the Eel River estuary as a top acquisition priority. The Wildlands Conservancy purchased the former Connick Ranch in 2008, creating the Eel River Estuary Preserve. The following year, the conservancy acquired the adjoining dunes, establishing the Sounding Seas Dunes Reserve.

== Conservation ==
The Eel River estuary has long been identified as a priority area for tidal wetland restoration and salmon habitat recovery. Restoration planning has included proposals to restore tidal inundation, improve fish passage, restore tidal marsh processes, and expand estuarine rearing habitat for salmonids.

In August 2025, the California Coastal Commission approved the Russ Creek and Centerville Slough Restoration Project, affecting much of the preserve and surrounding estuary lands. The project includes removal of levees and tidal gates to restore tidal flow, along with demolition of selected ranch-era structures associated with former land use. During the review process, representatives of the Wiyot Tribe raised concerns regarding cultural impacts, grazing, and consultation, while other environmental organizations expressed conditional support for the project. Construction is scheduled from 2026 to 2028.

== Recreation ==
Public access to the preserve has historically been limited and reservation-based. The approved restoration project includes expanded public access, including approximately three miles of trails, kayak launch sites, and public access along the beach between Centerville Beach County Park and the mouth of the Eel River.

== See also ==
- List of The Wildlands Conservancy preserves
- Seawood Cape Preserve
