= Santa Margarita River Trail Preserve =

Nature preserve in San Diego County, California

- IUCN category V (protected landscape/seascape)
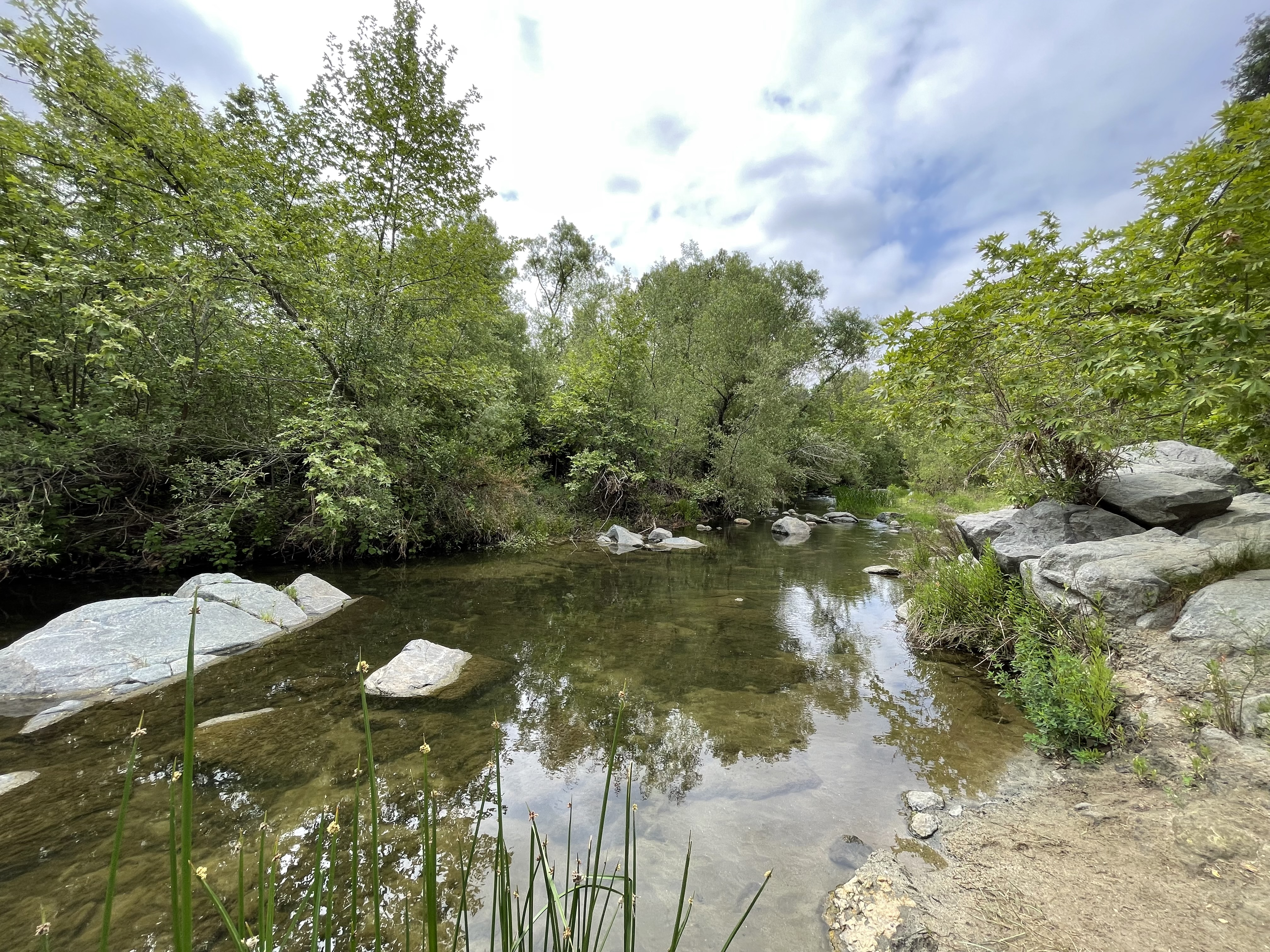
- Santa Margarita River and riparian corridor

- Location within California
- Interactive map of Santa Margarita River Trail Preserve
- Location: San Diego County, California
- Nearest city: Fallbrook, California
- Coordinates: 33.41338°N 117.24159°W
- Area: 1,384 acres (560 ha)
- Max. elevation: 1,100 ft (340 m)
- Min. elevation: 320 ft (98 m)
- Created: 2018
- Operator: The Wildlands Conservancy
- Website: Santa Margarita River Trail Preserve

Santa Margarita River Trail Preserve is a nature preserve owned and managed by The Wildlands Conservancy, a nonprofit land conservancy. The 1,384 acres (560 ha) property, established in 2018, is located in San Diego County, California, near Fallbrook, California. It protects a five-mile stretch of the Santa Margarita River, one of the last free-flowing rivers in Southern California. It is one of the preserves managed by The Wildlands Conservancy.

== Geography ==
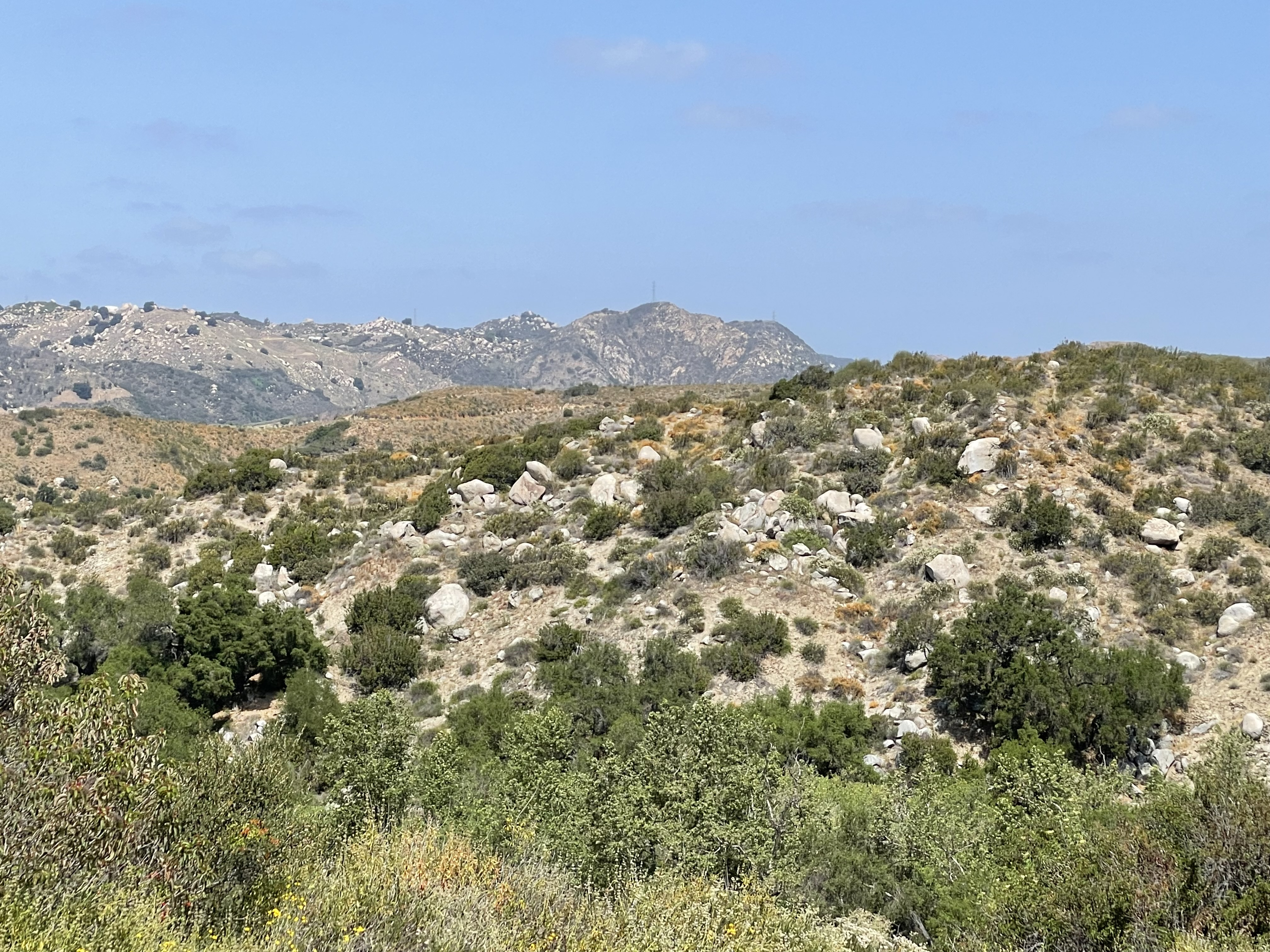
Overlook above riparian corridor

The preserve encompasses riparian woodlands along the Santa Margarita River, shaded by oak and sycamore trees. Its terrain ranges from chaparral and coastal sage scrub hillsides to riverine habitats, with elevations between 320 feet (98 m) and 1,100 feet (340 m). The preserve protects more than five miles of river corridor, creating one of the longest continuous stretches of protected riparian habitat in coastal Southern California. It is part of a larger corridor of conservation lands that includes the California Department of Fish and Wildlife, the Bureau of Land Management, the Santa Margarita Ecological Reserve, and the adjoining county park.

== Flora and fauna ==
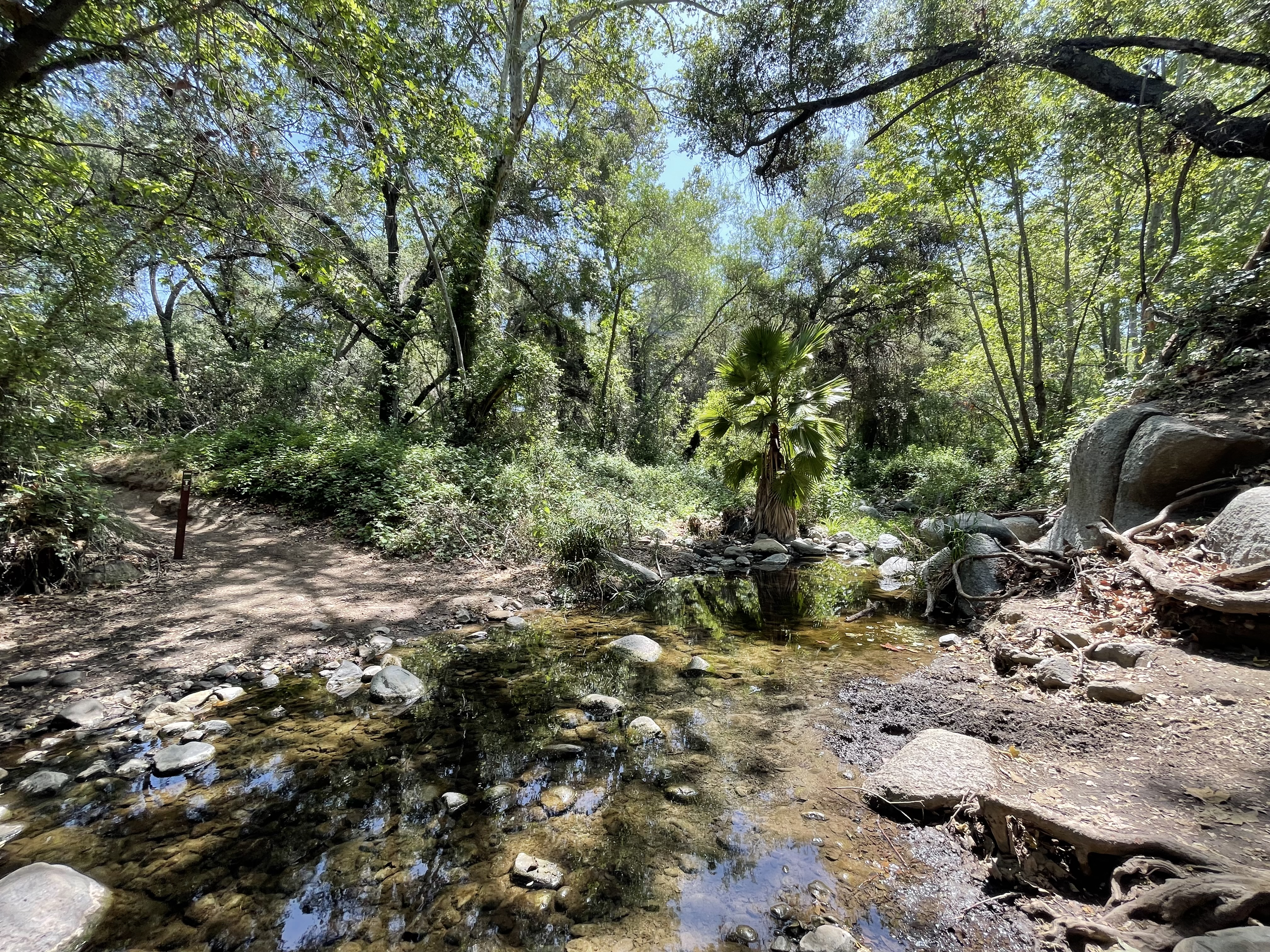
Rainbow Creek crossing

The preserve includes riparian woodlands dominated by coast live oak and western sycamore, along with surrounding hillsides of chaparral and coastal sage scrub.

Surveys in the river corridor have documented several sensitive or federally listed species, including the least Bell’s vireo, southwestern willow flycatcher, and arroyo toad. The river also supports aquatic species such as rainbow trout and Pacific lamprey, and is recognized as potential habitat for the endangered southern steelhead trout.

California golden beavers are active in the preserve, creating ponds and impoundments along the river channel.

== History ==
For over six decades, the property was owned by the Fallbrook Public Utility District, which had once considered constructing a hydroelectric dam on the Santa Margarita River.

In August 2018, FPUD sold its land to The Wildlands Conservancy, ending its long-standing plan to dam the river. The acquisition was supported by funds from bonds authorized under Proposition 68.

The California State Coastal Conservancy also approved funding for the acquisition, citing the preserve’s ecological significance and recreational value.

Following the transfer, The Wildlands Conservancy partnered with the Fallbrook Trails Council to continue maintaining the trail system.

== Conservation and management ==
The preserve contributes to recovery efforts for southern steelhead trout, including the Sandia Creek Drive Bridge Replacement Project in partnership with California Trout. Management goals emphasize biodiversity protection, watershed health, and maintaining regional habitat connectivity.

== Restoration ==
The preserve is the site of the Sandia Creek Drive Bridge Replacement Project, a multi-year effort to improve both public access and river ecology. For decades, a low-water causeway provided vehicle access across the Santa Margarita River but created a barrier for migrating fish and was frequently closed during floods.

The replacement project aims to restore natural river flow and provide fish passage for the federally endangered southern steelhead trout, while also ensuring safe travel for thousands of vehicles daily, including access to nearby Camp Pendleton .

Construction began in 2023 but was paused after the discovery of Native American cultural artifacts. At the request of the Pechanga Band of Indians, the bridge design was altered to avoid the sensitive site, requiring a new alignment and structural redesign.

The redesigned steel bridge will be constructed adjacent to the existing crossing, with completion targeted for 2027. Once finished, it will open 12 miles of upstream habitat to juvenile and adult steelhead, while replacing the flood-prone culvert causeway.

The project is a collaboration among The Wildlands Conservancy, California Trout, the County of San Diego, the Pechanga Band of Indians, and multiple state and federal agencies.

== Recreation and access ==
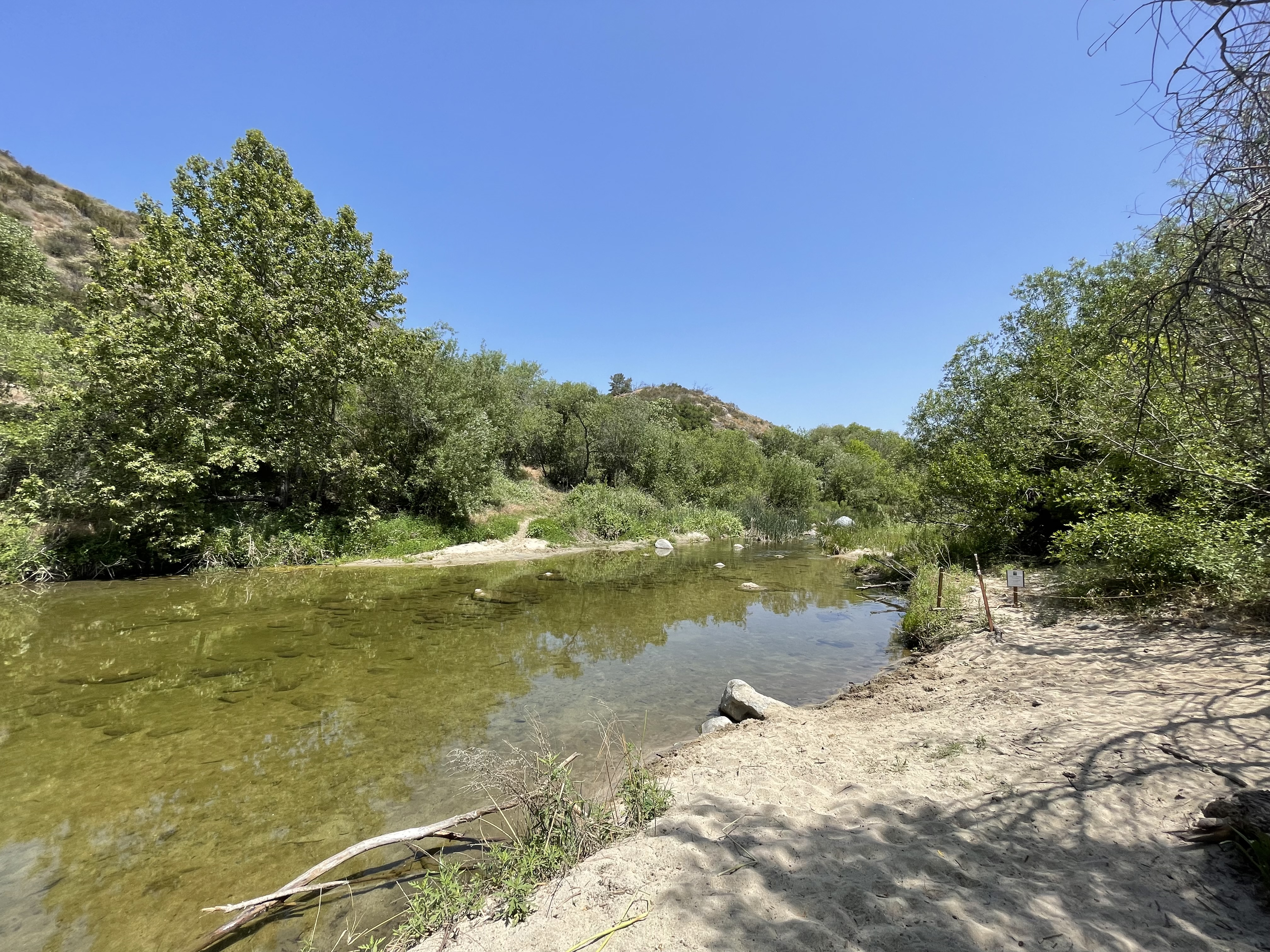
Trail ford across the river

The preserve contains more than 18 miles of multi-use trails open to hiking, biking, and horseback riding. Equestrians have a long history of using the trail system, with some stretches offering parallel routes designed for horseback use.

The trail network connects with the adjoining county park, which serves as a key access point and trailhead for equestrian users. The Santa Margarita River, which runs for five miles through the preserve, has been described as one of the last free-flowing rivers in Southern California and a popular setting for hiking.

Heavy visitation has occasionally led to overcrowding and parking challenges. In 2020, local reports noted illegal parking and congestion near the trailhead, leading to expansions of available parking areas.

== See also ==
- List of The Wildlands Conservancy preserves
