= California Trout =

American nonprofit organization

- Abbreviation: CalTrout
- Formation: 1971; 55 years ago
- Founder: Richard May
- Type: 501(c)(3) non-profit
- Legal status: Nonprofit organization
- Headquarters: San Francisco, California
- Region served: California
- Methods: Habitat restoration, advocacy
- Executive director: Curtis Knight
- Staff: 60 (2023)
- Volunteers: 75 (2023)
- Website: caltrout.org

California Trout (CalTrout) is a 501(c)(3) conservation nonprofit focused on protecting and restoring wild fisheries across California through habitat restoration, watershed restoration, and policy advocacy. Its projects have included dam removal, fish-passage restoration, meadow and estuary restoration, and conservation efforts for native trout, salmon, and steelhead.

== History ==
In 1968, the Hat Creek Demonstration Project helped establish the concept of wild trout management in California and contributed to the eventual formation of California Trout.

California Trout was established in 1971 by angler and conservationist Richard May after splitting from Trout Unlimited to form an independent organization focused on California's fisheries.

In 2024, four hydroelectric dams were removed from the Klamath River, reopening more than 300 miles of habitat for native salmon and steelhead. CalTrout collaborated with numerous organizations on the effort.

== Programs ==
Work is organized around regional programs and statewide initiatives. The regions are North Coast, Central Valley, Sierra Headwaters, Bay Area, Mount Shasta–Klamath, South Coast, and Mount Lassen.

Key initiatives include Protect the Best, Reconnect Habitat, Integrate Fish and Working Lands, Steward Source Water Areas, and Restore Estuaries. Selected projects include:

=== Protect the Best ===
Alameda Creek (Bay Area): CalTrout participated in a decades-long effort to restore fish passage along Alameda Creek. Historically this creek produced the most steelhead and Chinook salmon in the San Francisco Bay watershed. In 2025, the final major fish barrier was removed, reopening access to upstream spawning habitat.

=== Reconnect Habitat ===
Klamath River (North Coast): CalTrout was a partner in the removal of dams on the Klamath River, completed in 2024 in what has been described as the largest dam removal project in U.S. history. The multi-year effort also involved tribal nations, federal agencies, and conservation groups such as American Rivers.

Santa Margarita River (South Coast): In San Diego County, CalTrout has led the Sandia Creek Drive Bridge Replacement Project on the Santa Margarita River, located within the Santa Margarita River Trail Preserve, which is owned and managed by The Wildlands Conservancy. The project, undertaken with partners including NOAA Fisheries and San Diego County, is designed to remove a long-standing barrier and reopen 12 miles of upstream habitat for endangered southern steelhead.

=== Steward Source Water Areas ===
Sierra Meadows Strategy (Sierra Headwaters): CalTrout participated in the Sierra Meadows Partnership, a collaborative initiative supporting restoration and protection of Sierra Nevada meadows that store water, improve watershed health, and support native ecosystems.

=== Restore Estuaries ===
Eel River Estuary (North Coast): CalTrout is a partner in the Cannibal Island Restoration Project in Humboldt County, a 795-acre effort to reconnect tidal wetlands in the Eel River estuary. The project, approved in 2025 with support from the California Department of Fish and Wildlife and the California Coastal Conservancy, is designed to restore habitat for salmon, steelhead, and other native species while improving flood resilience.

== Advocacy ==
In addition to restoration projects, CalTrout has been active in policy advocacy. In 2018, it joined Restore Hetch Hetchy in proposing limited public boating access on the Hetch Hetchy Reservoir for the first time, arguing that San Francisco had long benefitted from the water system but the American public had not.
