= Enchanted Rocks Preserve =

Nature reserve in Jefferson County, Oregon

- IUCN category V (protected landscape/seascape)
- Location within Oregon
- Location: Jefferson County, Oregon
- Nearest city: Mitchell, Oregon
- Coordinates: 44°46′15″N 120°23′22″W
- Area: 14,000 acres (57 km^{2})
- Max. elevation: 5,048 feet (1,539 m)
- Min. elevation: 1,400 feet (430 m)
- Created: 2022
- Operator: The Wildlands Conservancy
- Website: Enchanted Rocks Preserve

Enchanted Rocks Preserve is a nature preserve owned and managed by The Wildlands Conservancy, a nonprofit land conservancy. Spanning over 14,000 acres (57 km^{2}) in Jefferson County, Oregon, northwest of Mitchell, the preserve includes a section of the National Wild and Scenic John Day River. It is part of the organization's collection of natural lands, and more preserves can be found in the list of preserves.

== Geography ==
The preserve includes 2 miles (3.2 km) of the John Day River and 17 miles (27 km) of Cherry Creek.

== Flora and Fauna ==
Wildlife includes Rocky Mountain elk, bald eagles, and beavers.

== History ==
In 2022, The Wildlands Conservancy acquired the Cherry Creek Ranch, creating the first Wildlands Conservancy preserve in Oregon.

== See also ==
- List of The Wildlands Conservancy preserves
