= Spyrock Reserve =

Nature preserve in Mendocino County, California

- IUCN category V (protected landscape/seascape)
- Location within California
- Interactive map of Spyrock Reserve
- Location: Mendocino County, California
- Nearest city: Laytonville, California
- Coordinates: 39°51′55″N 123°26′13″W
- Area: 5,832 acres (2,360 ha)
- Max. elevation: 3,100 ft (940 m)
- Min. elevation: 700 ft (210 m)
- Established: 2005
- Operator: The Wildlands Conservancy
- Website: Spyrock Reserve

Spyrock Reserve is a nature preserve with five miles of frontage on the National Wild and Scenic Eel River. Its namesake, Spy Rock, is a 540-foot promontory above the river and a landmark for Eel River travelers. It is part of the Eel River Emerald Necklace, a series of preserves along the Eel River. The 5,832 acres (2,360 ha) reserve is owned and managed by The Wildlands Conservancy as part of its system of preserves.

== Geography ==
Spyrock Reserve is located along the Eel River in Mendocino County, California. The preserve includes oak woodlands, grasslands, fir stands, and two perennial creeks. It lies 10.5 miles downstream from Dos Rios, where the river’s main and middle forks join.

== Flora and fauna ==
The reserve includes riverine and riparian habitats. Fish populations include salmon and steelhead trout.

== History ==
The property was acquired in 2005 as part of The Wildlands Conservancy's Eel River Emerald Necklace initiative.

== Recreation ==
There is no public land access to the preserve. The reserve can be viewed from the river.

== See also ==
- List of The Wildlands Conservancy preserves
- Eel River Canyon Preserve
