= Emerald Waters Reserve =

Nature preserve in Humboldt and Trinity counties, California

- IUCN category V (protected landscape/seascape)
- Location within California
- Interactive map of Emerald Waters Reserve
- Location: Humboldt County, California and Trinity County, California
- Nearest city: Alderpoint, California
- Coordinates: 40°07′20″N 123°33′35″W
- Area: 3,019 acres (1,222 ha)
- Max. elevation: 2,600 ft (790 m)
- Min. elevation: 340 ft (100 m)
- Established: 2019
- Operator: The Wildlands Conservancy
- Website: Emerald Waters Reserve

Emerald Waters Reserve is a nature preserve that protects 4.5 miles (7.2 km) of the Eel River in a remote canyon with aquamarine-colored pools and steep oak woodlands. The 3,019 acres (1,222 ha) preserve is owned and managed by The Wildlands Conservancy as part of its system of preserves.

== Geography ==
The preserve includes 4.5 miles (7.2 km) of riverfront along the Eel River. Its terrain ranges from 340 feet (100 m) to 2,600 feet (790 m), dominated by white oak woodlands and oak savanna that descend steep canyon slopes to the river. Other trees include bay laurel, buckeye, and pockets of Douglas fir. The name "Emerald Waters" refers to the aquamarine river and swimming holes.

== Flora and fauna ==
The Eel River supports salmon and steelhead trout. Upland habitats support large mammals, including Roosevelt elk that occasionally range onto the property.

== History ==
The Wildlands Conservancy acquired the property in 2019.

== Conservation ==
The preserve forms part of The Wildlands Conservancy's Eel River Emerald Necklace conservation initiative.

== Recreation ==
The preserve is not open to public access. Planning for a segment of the Great Redwood Trail extends to the northern boundary of the preserve near Alderpoint.

== See also ==
- List of The Wildlands Conservancy preserves
- Eel River Canyon Preserve
