= Oak Glen Preserve =

Nature preserve in San Bernardino County, California

- IUCN category V (protected landscape/seascape)
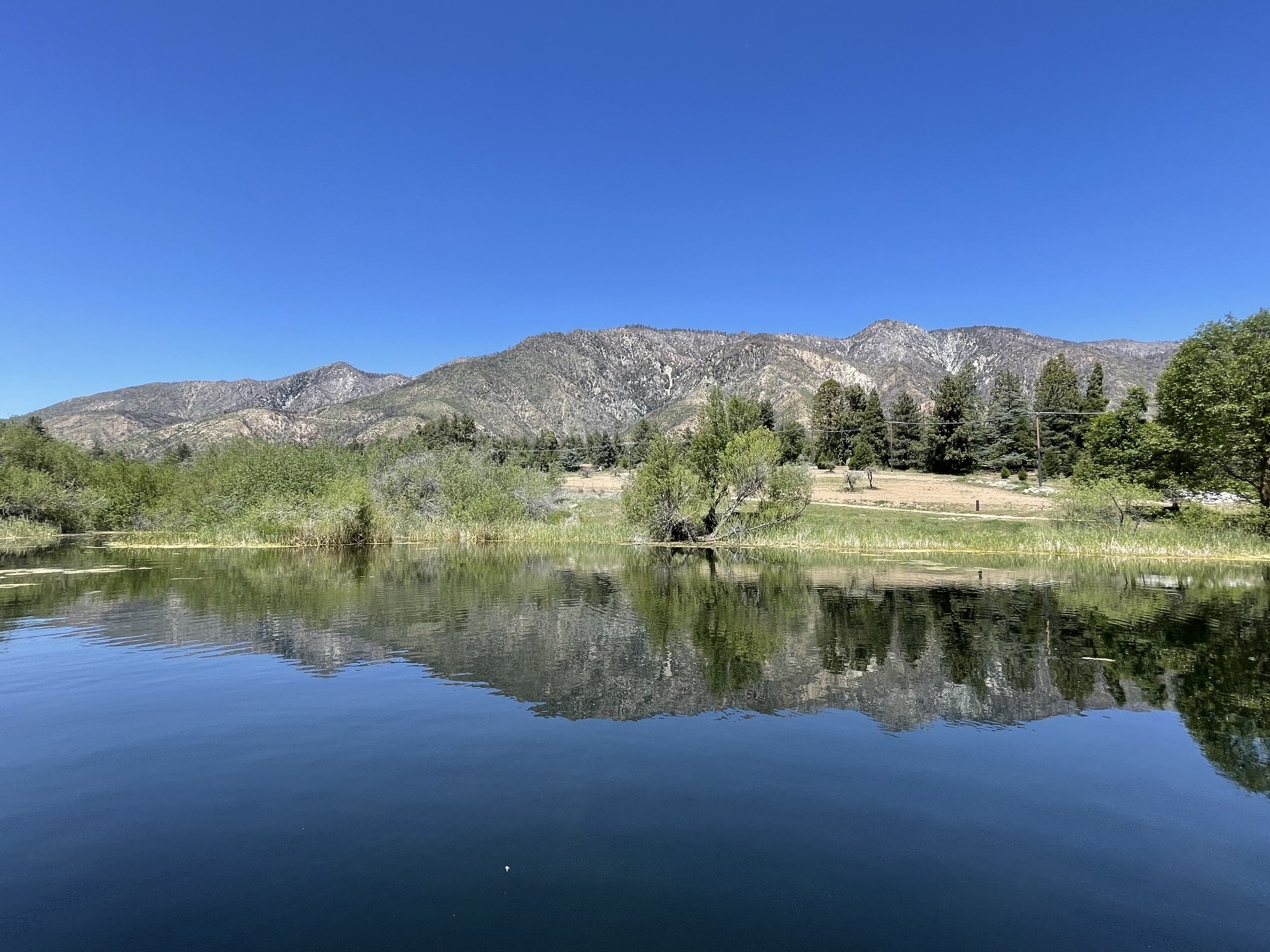
- Yucaipa Ridge

- Location within California
- Interactive map of Oak Glen Preserve
- Location: San Bernardino County, California
- Nearest city: Oak Glen, California
- Coordinates: 34°2′25″N 116°56′29″W
- Area: 909 acres (368 ha)
- Max. elevation: 8,683 ft (2,647 m)
- Min. elevation: 4,430 ft (1,350 m)
- Created: 1996
- Visitors: 600,000 (in 2023)
- Operator: The Wildlands Conservancy
- Website: Oak Glen Preserve

Oak Glen Preserve is a nature preserve owned and managed by The Wildlands Conservancy, a nonprofit land conservancy. Covering 909 acres (368 ha) in San Bernardino County, California, it is located in the western foothills of the San Bernardino Mountains. The preserve includes the Southern California Montane Botanic Garden and Children's Outdoor Discovery Center, as well as Los Rios Rancho, a historic apple orchard. It receives about 600,000 visitors annually. More preserves can be found in the list of preserves.

== Geography ==
The preserve is located in a glen at 5,024 feet (1,531 m) in the San Bernardino Mountains of the Transverse Ranges, beneath Wilshire Peak (8,700 feet (2,700 m)) and adjacent to Pisgah Peak (5,496 feet (1,675 m)). Although the core preserve around the botanic garden is relatively level, additional preserve parcels extend onto nearby mountain slopes and summits, including portions of Wilshire Peak, Cedar Mountain, and Oak Glen Peak along the ridge rising above the preserve.

In 2018, the 1,280-acre Galena Peak tract, including its 9,324 feet (2,842 m) summit, was separated into the distinct Galena Peak Wilderness Reserve.

== Flora and fauna ==
Oak Glen Preserve contains oak woodland, conifer forest, and chaparral vegetation communities.

The preserve contains the Champion Oak, an 800–1,000-year-old canyon live oak measuring 39 feet (12 m) in circumference and 124 feet (38 m) tall. American Forests recognizes it as the national champion of its species.

== History ==
Apple orchards have been part of Oak Glen since the 1860s. The community developed into a center of Southern California apple growing, its cool mountain setting contrasting with the surrounding desert.

By the late 20th century, Oak Glen’s growers faced economic pressures as global apple prices fell and visitor habits changed. Local growers increasingly turned to agritourism, offering pick-your-own orchards, cider pressing, and historical reenactments to attract visitors. Los Rios Rancho was at risk of subdivision in the mid-1990s, but in 1996 The Wildlands Conservancy acquired about 3,000 acres, including the ranch and additional nearby parcels reaching elevations of 9,300 feet, securing both the working orchard and surrounding open space.

Since 2004, most of the orchard has been leased to Riley Family Enterprises, which manages apple growing and associated visitor activities.

In 2014, the Southern California Montane Botanic Garden and Children's Outdoor Discovery Center were opened.

In 2018, pests killed many of the preserve's oak trees, requiring removal of diseased trees.

In December 2019, a major snowstorm caused extensive tree damage at the preserve, toppling hundreds of trees. Thirty percent of black oaks and many sycamores were lost.

In 2020, three fires impacted the preserve. The Apple Fire burned to Wilshire Peak and threatened the Champion Oak. The El Dorado Fire burned the north side of Oak Glen Preserve. A third fire destroyed Los Rios Rancho buildings, including the bakery, store, and packing house, as well as the preserve's ranger shop.

== Conservation ==
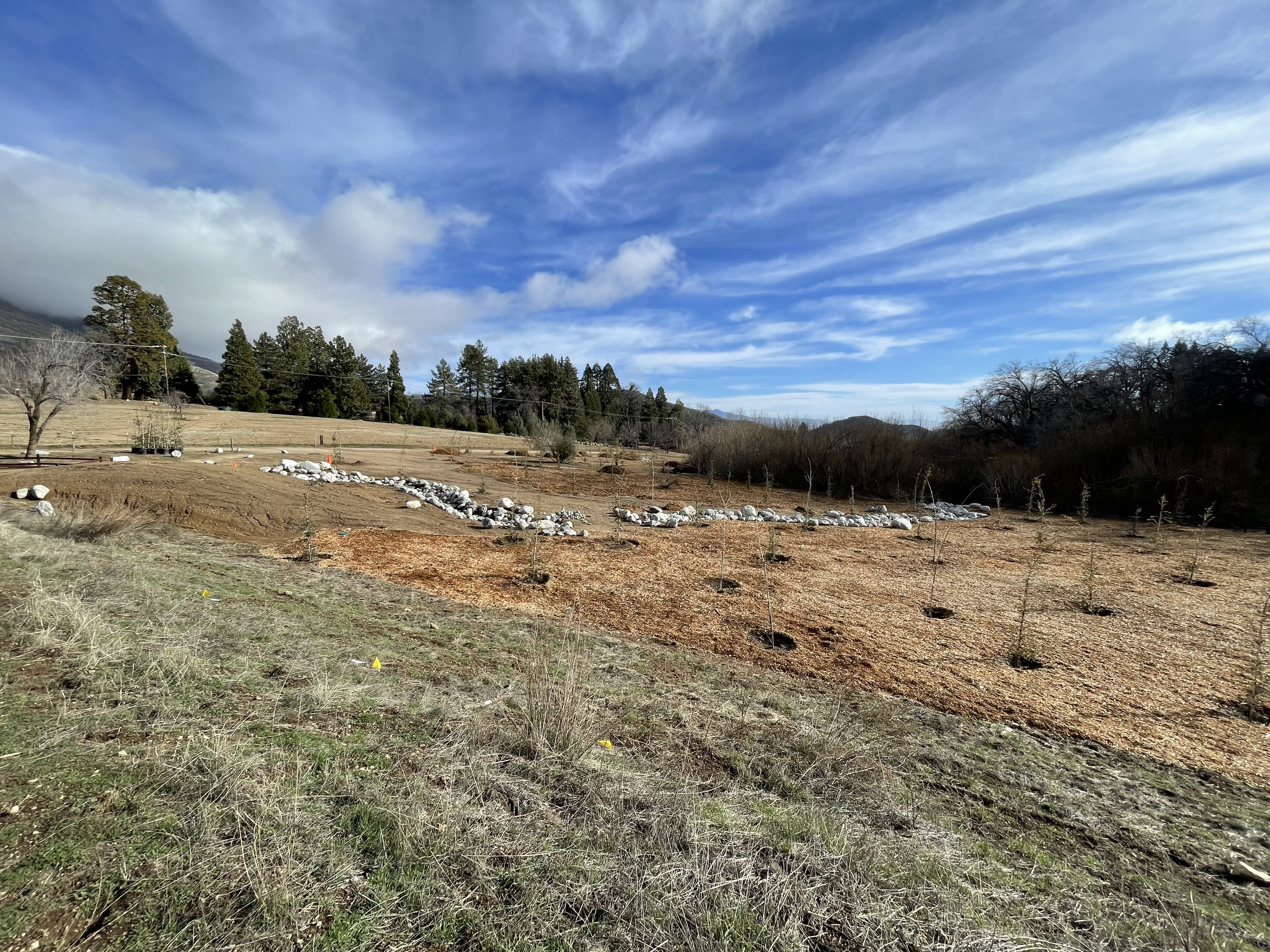
Oak restoration planting

Oak Glen Preserve has faced repeated ecological challenges, including pests, storms, and wildfire. In 2018, infestations of the invasive goldspotted oak borer caused widespread mortality of black oaks, requiring removal of diseased trees. The preserve also lost large numbers of trees during severe snowstorms in 2019–2020 and was affected by the Apple Fire and El Dorado Fire in 2020.

In 2024, The Wildlands Conservancy and the Global Conservation Consortium for Oak established the Experimental Oak Woodland at the preserve. The project planted three white oak species, including Engelmann oak, a species native to warmer and drier areas of Southern California. The project is intended to improve resilience to the goldspotted oak borer and climate change while serving as a long-term research and education site for oak conservation.

The preserve lies within a wildlife linkage identified in the South Coast Missing Linkages plan, which emphasized maintaining habitat corridors between desert and montane ecosystems.

== Recreation ==
Activities include picnicking, hiking, and educational programs. Trails pass through the botanic garden and surrounding landscape, with views of nearby peaks including Wilshire Peak and Pisgah Peak.

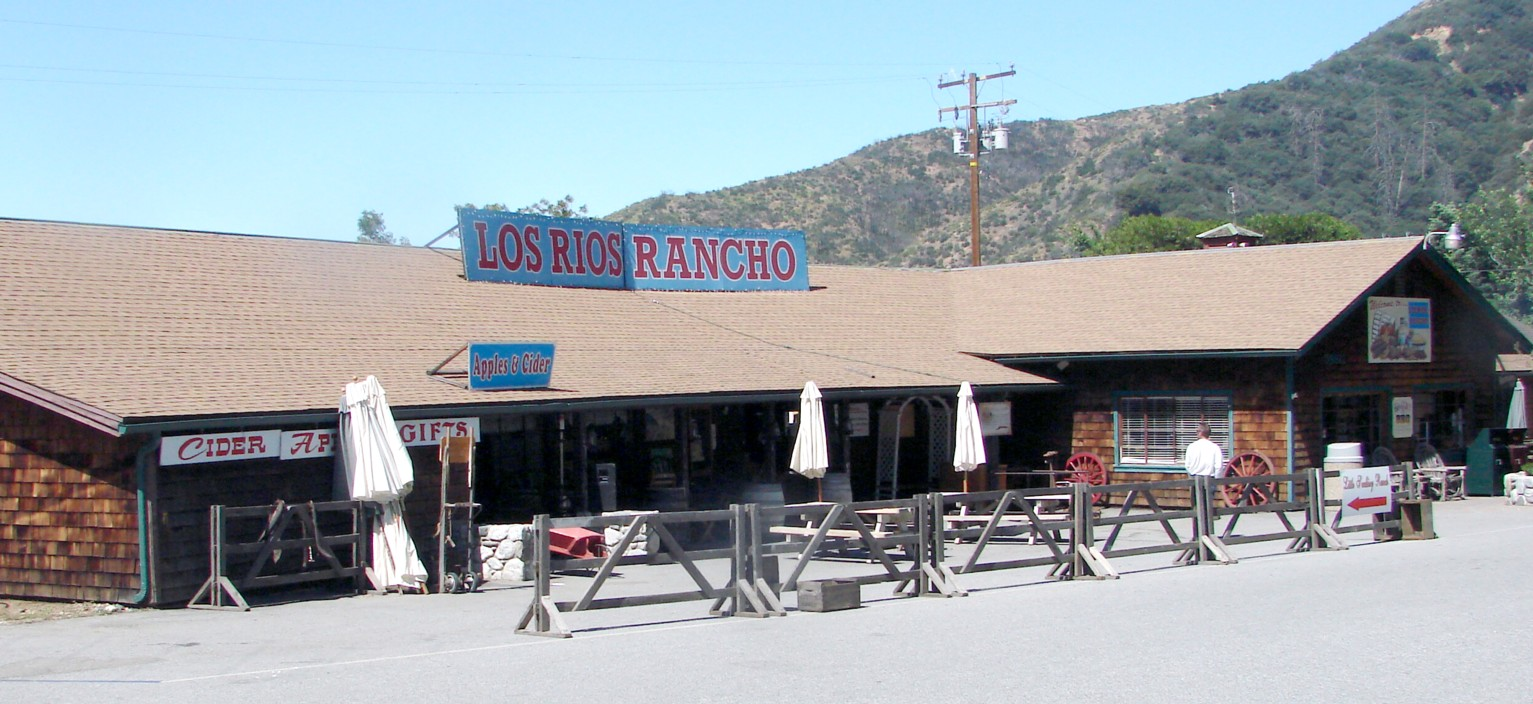
Los Rios Rancho store

Los Rios Rancho has operated since 1906 and is Southern California's largest apple orchard. From September to November, visitors can pick apples and purchase cider, pie, and other apple products. Seasonal events at the orchard and throughout Oak Glen attract large crowds each fall.

=== Trails ===
The preserve includes a two-mile Main Loop Trail with interpretive signage highlighting ponds, deciduous forest, and groves of conifers including giant sequoias, coast redwoods, Jeffrey pines, and sugar pines. A more strenuous trail leads to Preservation Point, an overlook above the preserve.

=== Botanic Garden ===
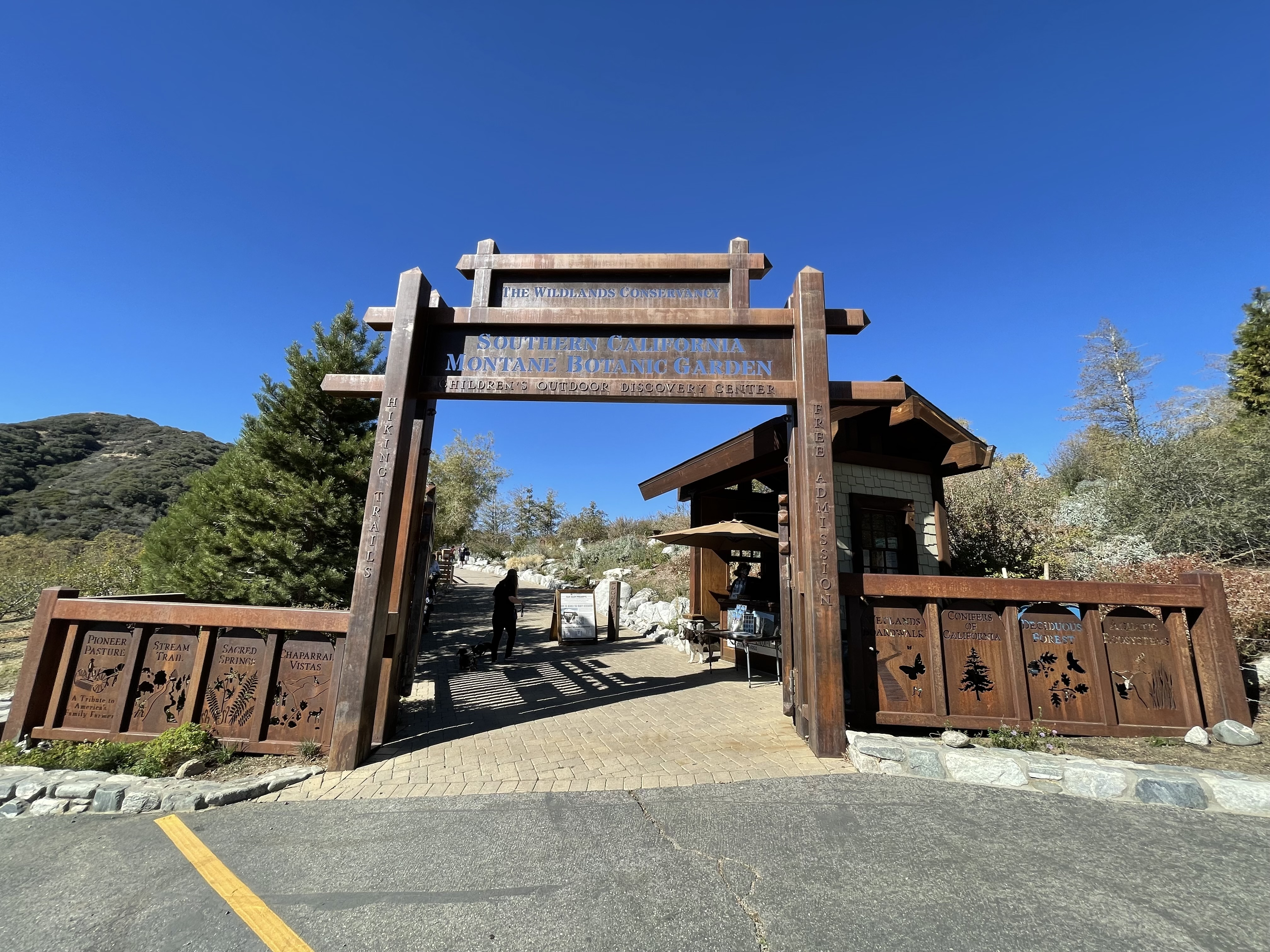
Botanic Garden entrance

The 220-acre Southern California Montane Botanic Garden contains ponds, streams, wetlands, oak and pine forest, chaparral, and willow woodland habitats. The garden includes a grove of giant sequoias planted by local ranchers beginning in the late 19th century, along with additional sequoias planted by The Wildlands Conservancy in 2003. The botanic garden is used for educational programs and public events.

=== Children’s Outdoor Discovery Center ===
The Children’s Outdoor Discovery Center is an interactive educational program in which naturalists guide students in exploring local ecosystems. By 2024, the program had introduced nearly half a million students to outdoor environments through field trips and hands-on activities at the preserve.

=== Botanic Garden venues ===
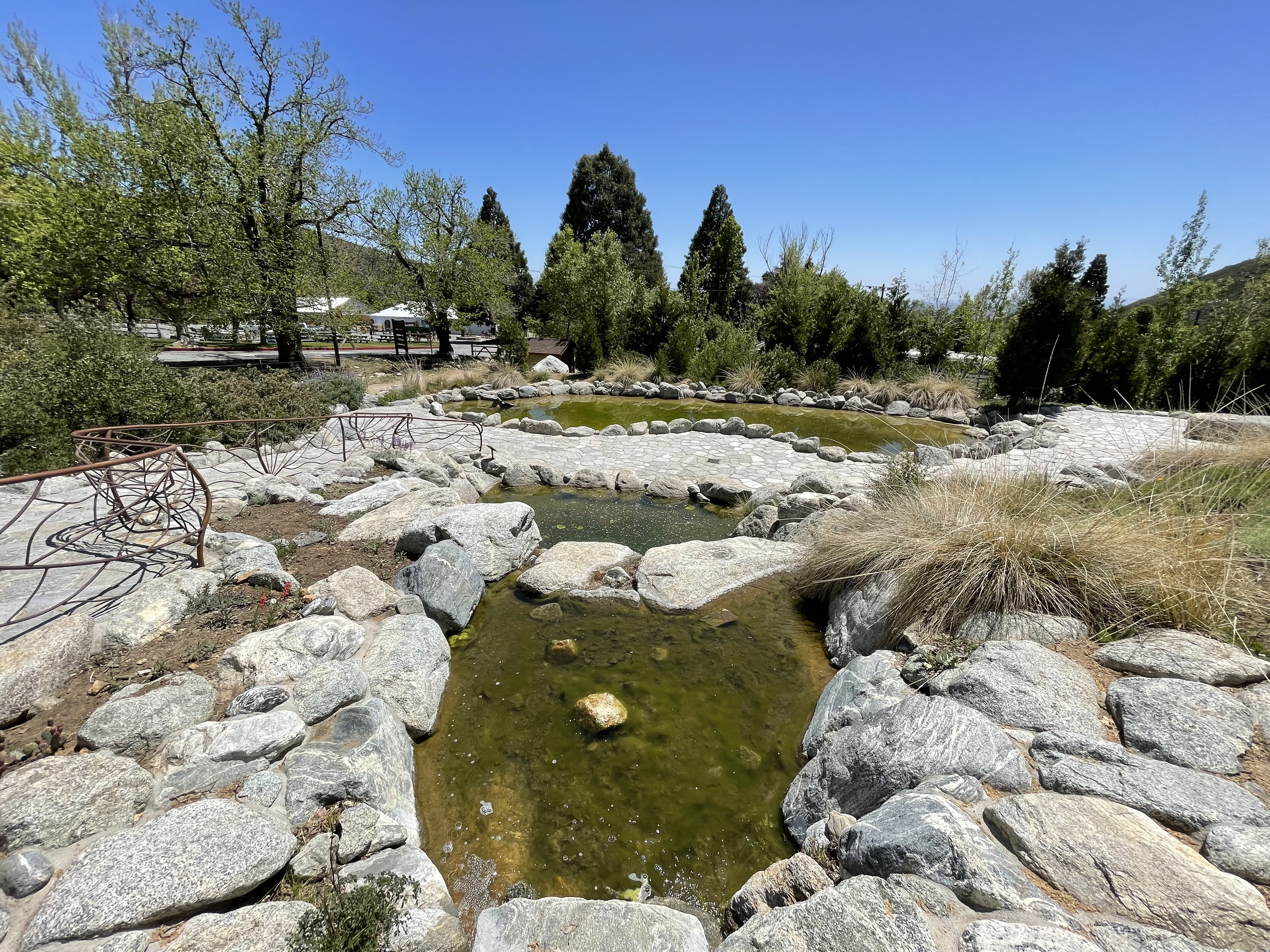
Falling Waters

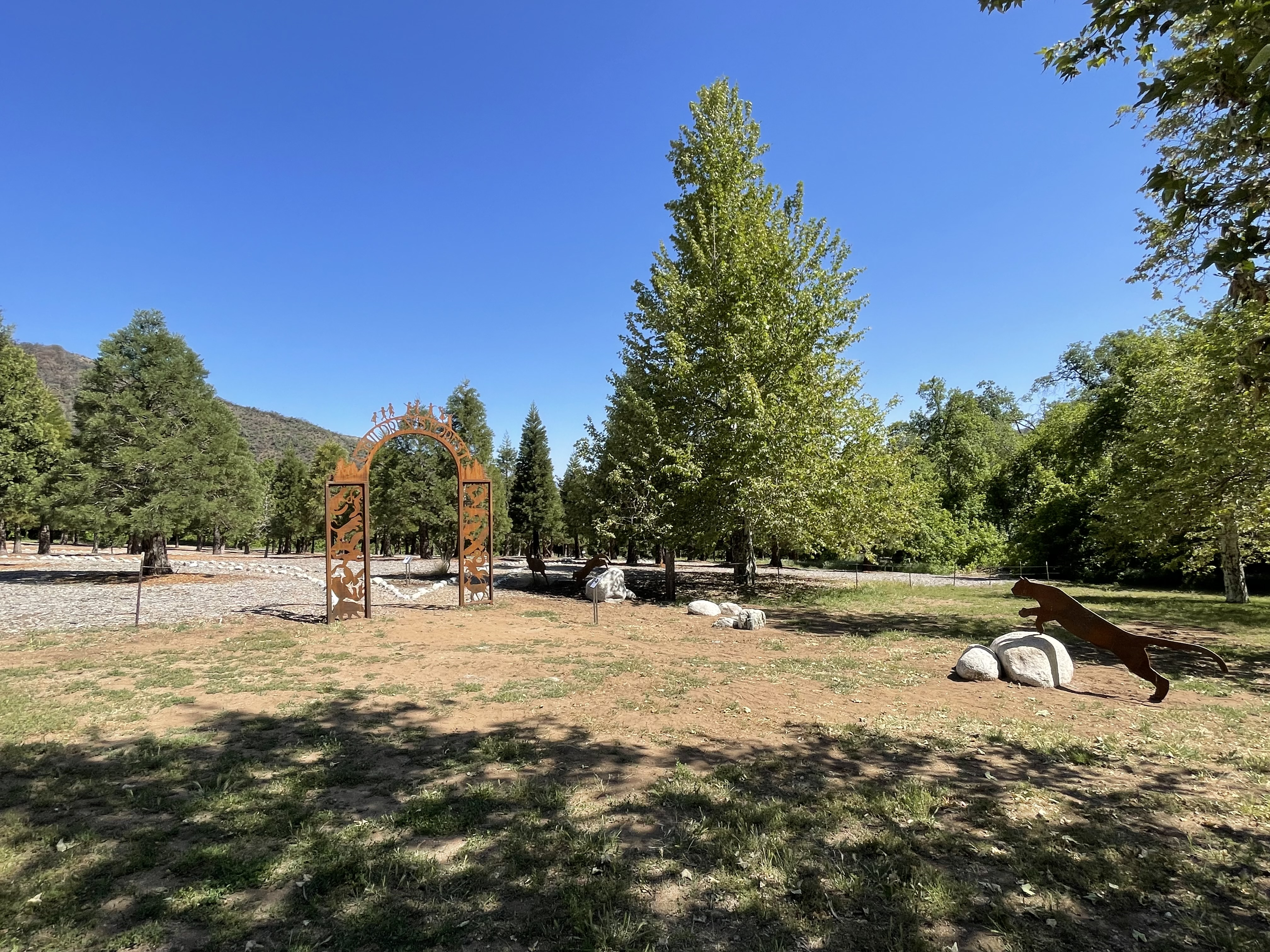
Children’s Forest

The Southern California Montane Botanic Garden includes a series of themed venues. Notable examples are Hummingbird Hill, planted with native species selected to attract hummingbirds, and the Artist’s Palette garden, which uses wildflowers chosen to evoke the colors of Monet’s paintings.

The Children’s Forest includes sequoias, cedars, and redwoods along a loop trail with interpretive features designed for children’s outdoor learning.

== See also ==
- List of The Wildlands Conservancy preserves
