= Seawood Cape Preserve =

Nature preserve in Humboldt County, California

- IUCN category V (protected landscape/seascape)
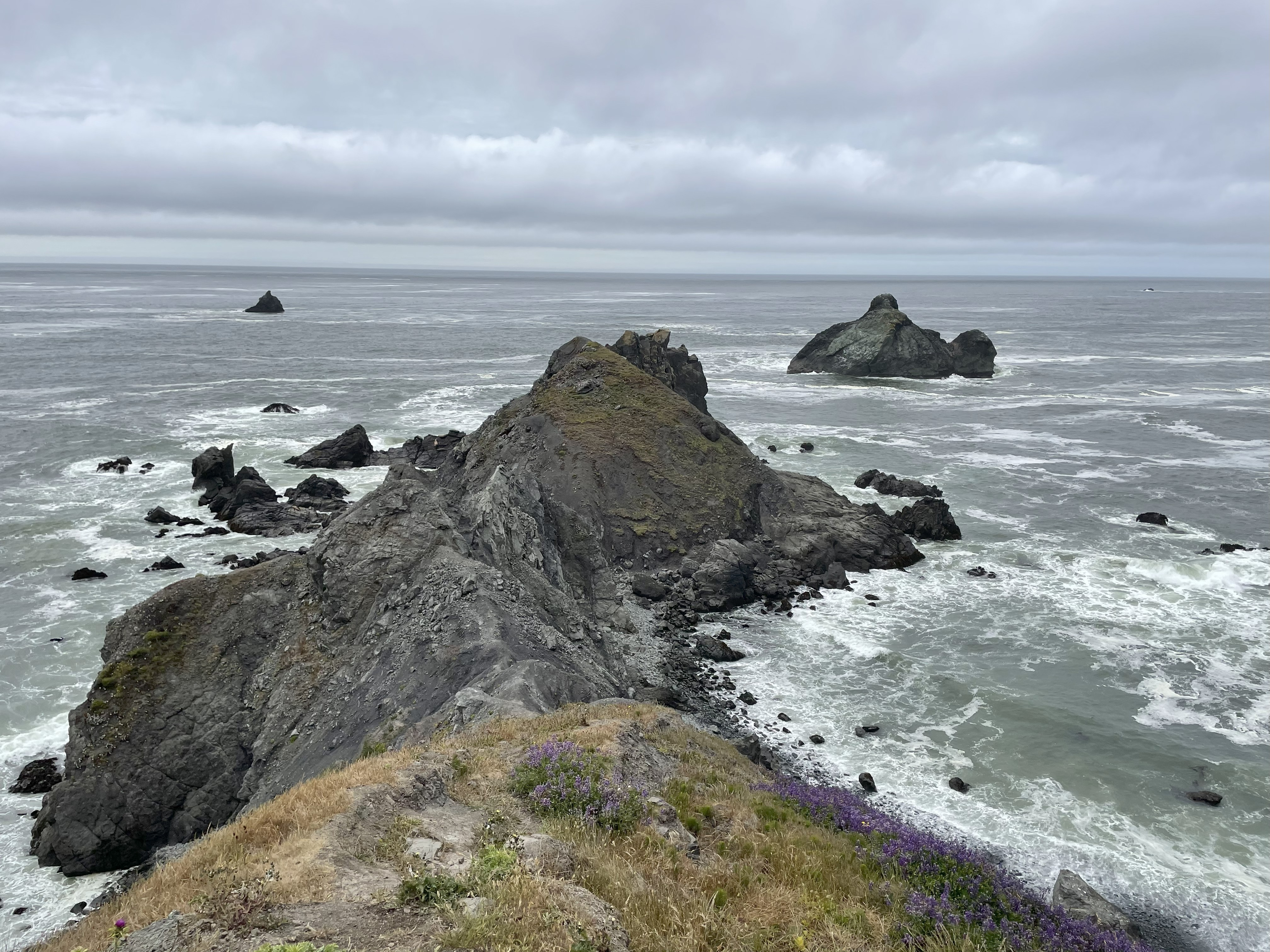
- Seawood Cape promontory

- Location within California
- Interactive map of Seawood Cape Preserve
- Location: Humboldt County, California, US
- Nearest city: Trinidad, California
- Coordinates: 41°06′05″N 124°09′41″W
- Area: 128 acres (52 ha)
- Max. elevation: 400 ft (120 m)
- Min. elevation: 0 ft (0 m)
- Created: 2018
- Operator: The Wildlands Conservancy
- Website: Seawood Cape Preserve

Seawood Cape Preserve is a nature preserve on the northern California coast, known for its rocky promontory with views north and south along the shoreline and offshore pinniped haul-out sites. The coastal bluff west of Patrick’s Point Road is open to the public for short walks to an overlook, while the inland side contains redwood and fir forest that is generally closed except for group access. The 128 acres (52 ha) preserve is owned by The Wildlands Conservancy as part of its system of preserves.

== Geography ==
The preserve lies a few miles south of Sue-meg State Park and includes nearly a mile of rocky coastline along the Pacific Ocean. Patrick’s Point Road divides the property, with coastal bluffs to the west and redwood–fir forest and canyon “fern gullies” to the east.

== Flora and fauna ==
Habitats include coastal bluff, wet meadow, alder woodland, and mixed spruce–fir and redwood forest. Marine mammals such as harbor seals and sea lions are common along the shoreline. A 2022 program of the California Native Plant Society highlighted coastal plant communities and restoration efforts at the preserve.

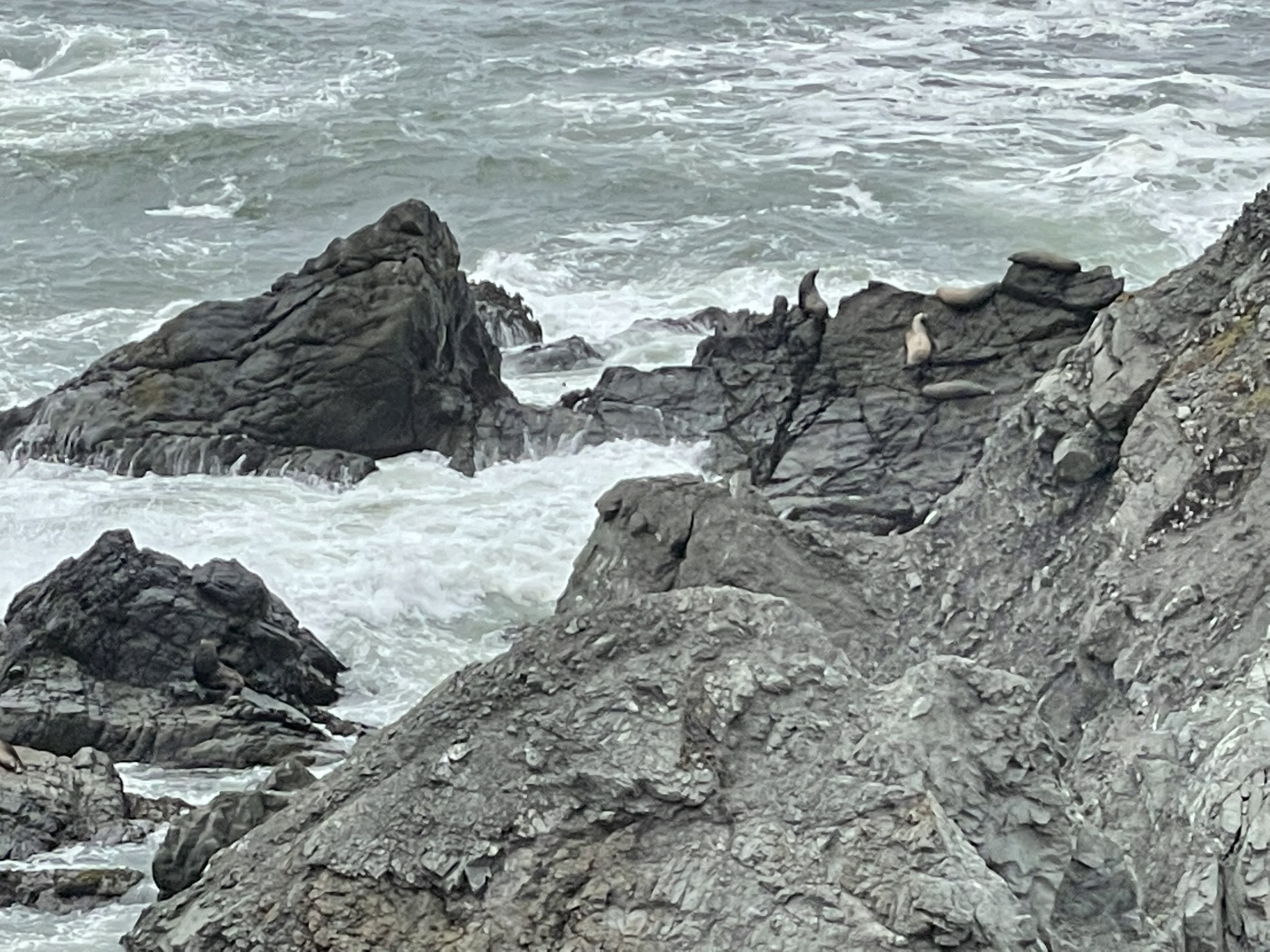
Pinnipeds on offshore rocks

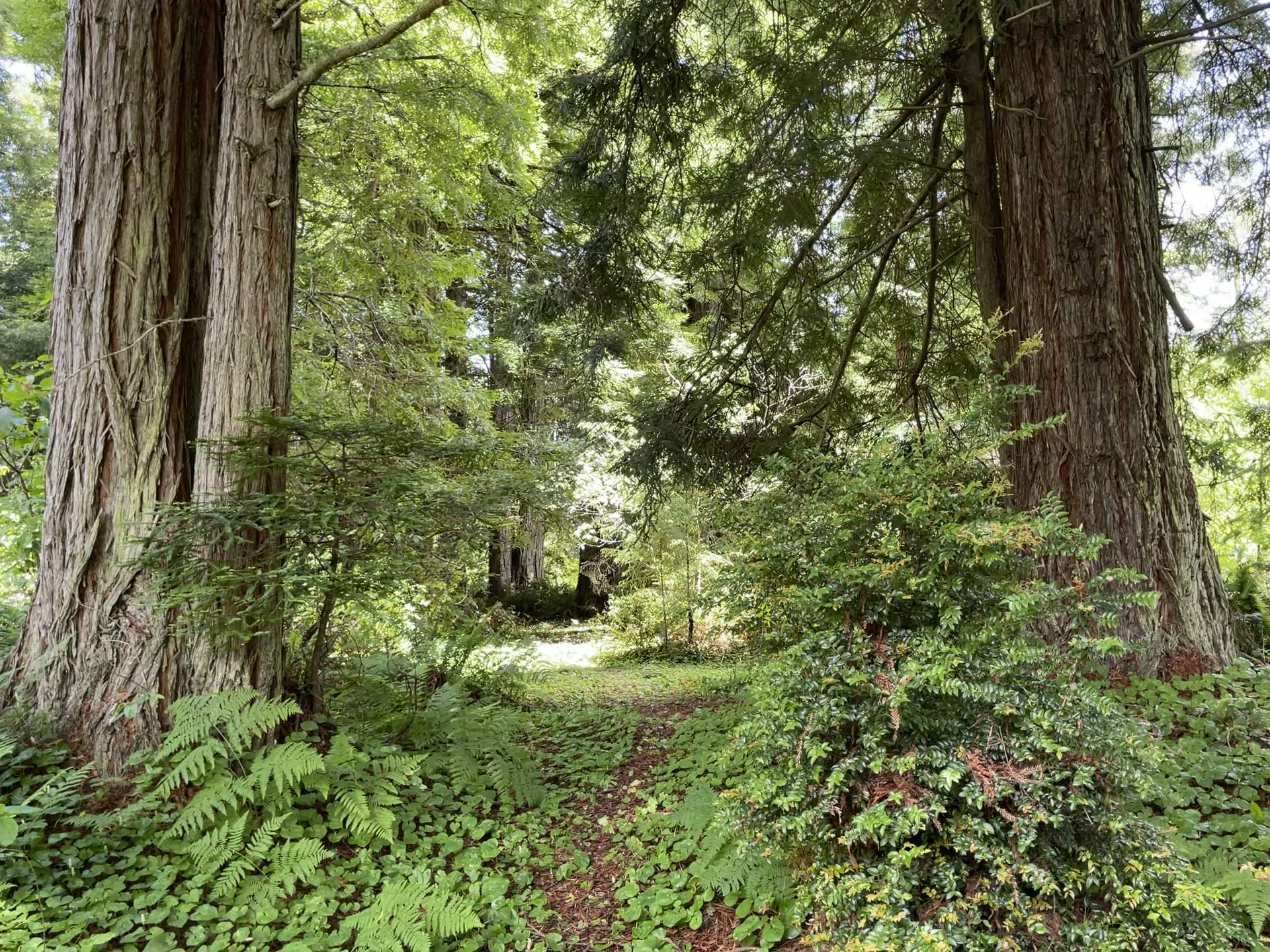
Redwood grove

== History ==
The Wildlands Conservancy acquired the property in 2018. An interview on Northcoast Environmental Center radio in 2020 discussed the acquisition as part of broader conservation in the Trinidad area.

== Conservation and management ==
The preserve was one of four study sites in a 2024 peer-reviewed project on the ultrasonic vocalizations of Humboldt’s flying squirrel.

== Education ==
The preserve has hosted youth volunteer and education events, consistent with The Wildlands Conservancy’s mission to involve young people in stewardship.

== Recreation ==
In February 2024, the California State Coastal Conservancy approved a grant of up to $315,150 for a public access plan at Seawood Cape Preserve. The plan covers trail improvements, campground infrastructure, and a new segment of the California Coastal Trail. It also includes development of an outdoor classroom, interpretive signage, a restroom, and improved parking facilities.

The Wildlands Conservancy has announced its intention to provide free camping once facilities are developed, including walk-in and bike-in sites.

The coastal bluff west of Patrick’s Point Road is open to the public, while the forested portion east of the road is generally closed except by reservation or permission. The preserve is occasionally included in events such as the annual Godwit Days birding festival.

== See also ==
- List of The Wildlands Conservancy preserves
