= The Wildlands Conservancy =

US conservation nonprofit organization

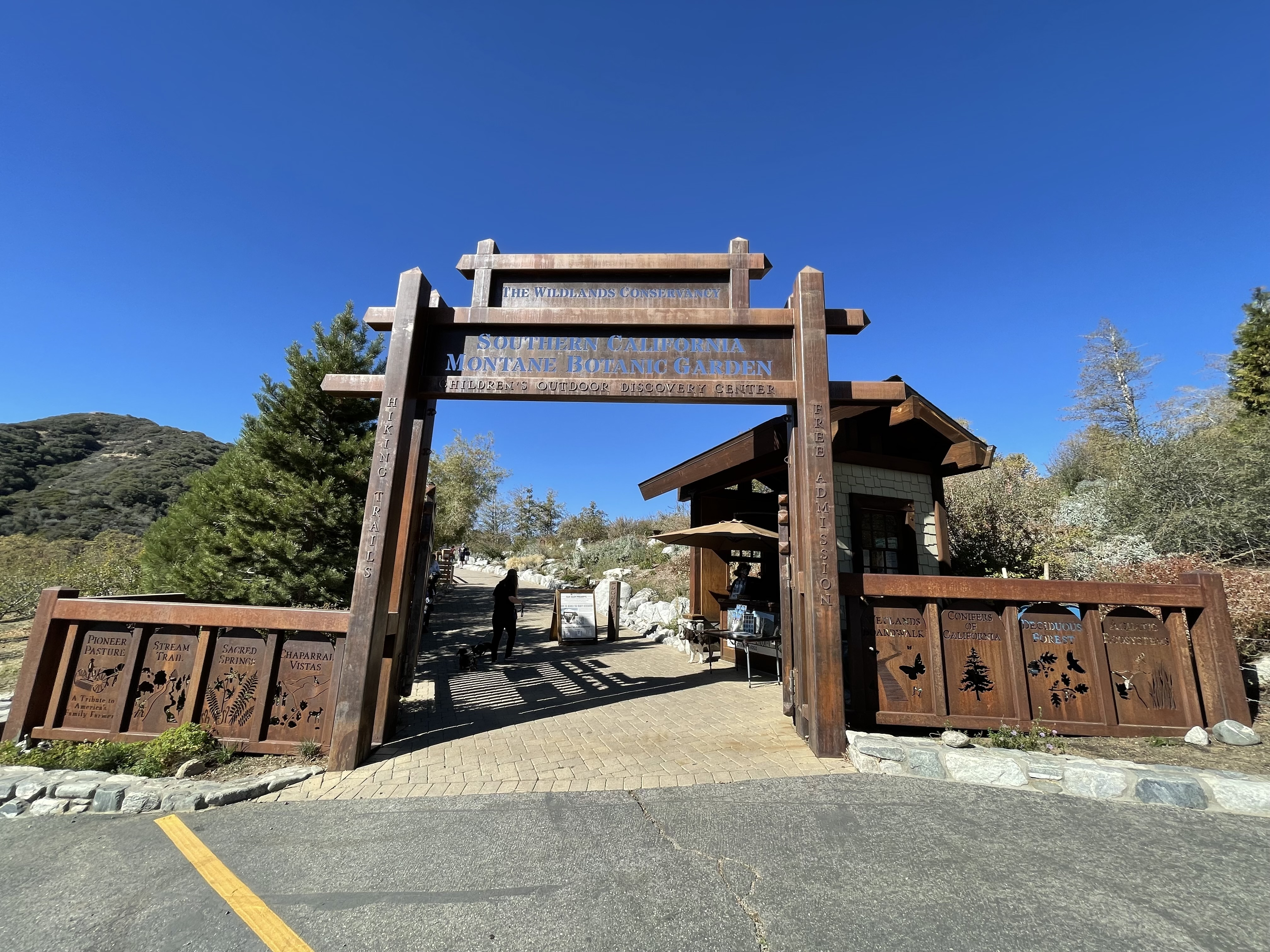
- Entrance arch at Oak Glen Preserve, headquarters of The Wildlands Conservancy
- Formation: 1995; 31 years ago
- Founder: David Gelbaum, David Myers
- Type: 501(c)(3) nonprofit organization
- Legal status: Charitable organization
- Purpose: Nature conservation and outdoor education
- Headquarters: Oak Glen, California
- Region served: California, Oregon, Utah
- Methods: Land acquisition, ecological restoration, public access, outdoor education
- Fields: Land conservation, ecological restoration, outdoor education
- Executive Director: Frazier Haney
- Staff: 106 (2024)
- Volunteers: 900 (2024)
- Website: wildlandsconservancy.org

The Wildlands Conservancy is a nonprofit land trust founded in 1995 that has protected more than 2,300,000 acres (930,000 ha) of land through acquisition and transfer. It manages 24 nature preserves totaling over 200,000 acres (81,000 ha) in California, Oregon, and Utah. Its preserves are visited by over 1.5 million people annually and offer free outdoor education programs for more than 60,000 youth each year. The conservancy has played a role in the establishment of several national monuments through land acquisitions and conservation initiatives.

Wildlands Conservancy preserves

== History ==
In 1995, The Wildlands Conservancy was founded to acquire and protect extensive private inholdings within public lands designated under the California Desert Protection Act of 1994, and to provide public access to conserved landscapes.

Beginning in the late 1990s, the conservancy's California Desert Land Acquisition Project acquired large tracts of former railroad and utility lands in the Mojave Desert. More than 500,000 acres (200,000 ha) were transferred to public agencies and later incorporated into national parks, wilderness areas, and national monuments.

Over time, the conservancy acquired and managed preserves throughout California and later in other western states.

The conservancy expanded beyond land acquisition to include restoration on its preserves and free, staff-led outdoor education programs.

== Holdings ==
The Wildlands Conservancy owns and manages 24 nature preserves across three states, totaling over 200,000 acres. It has transferred more than 500,000 acres to public agencies.

=== Representative landscapes ===
The preserves span a wide range of landscapes, including coasts, mountains and valleys, deserts, rivers, and canyons.

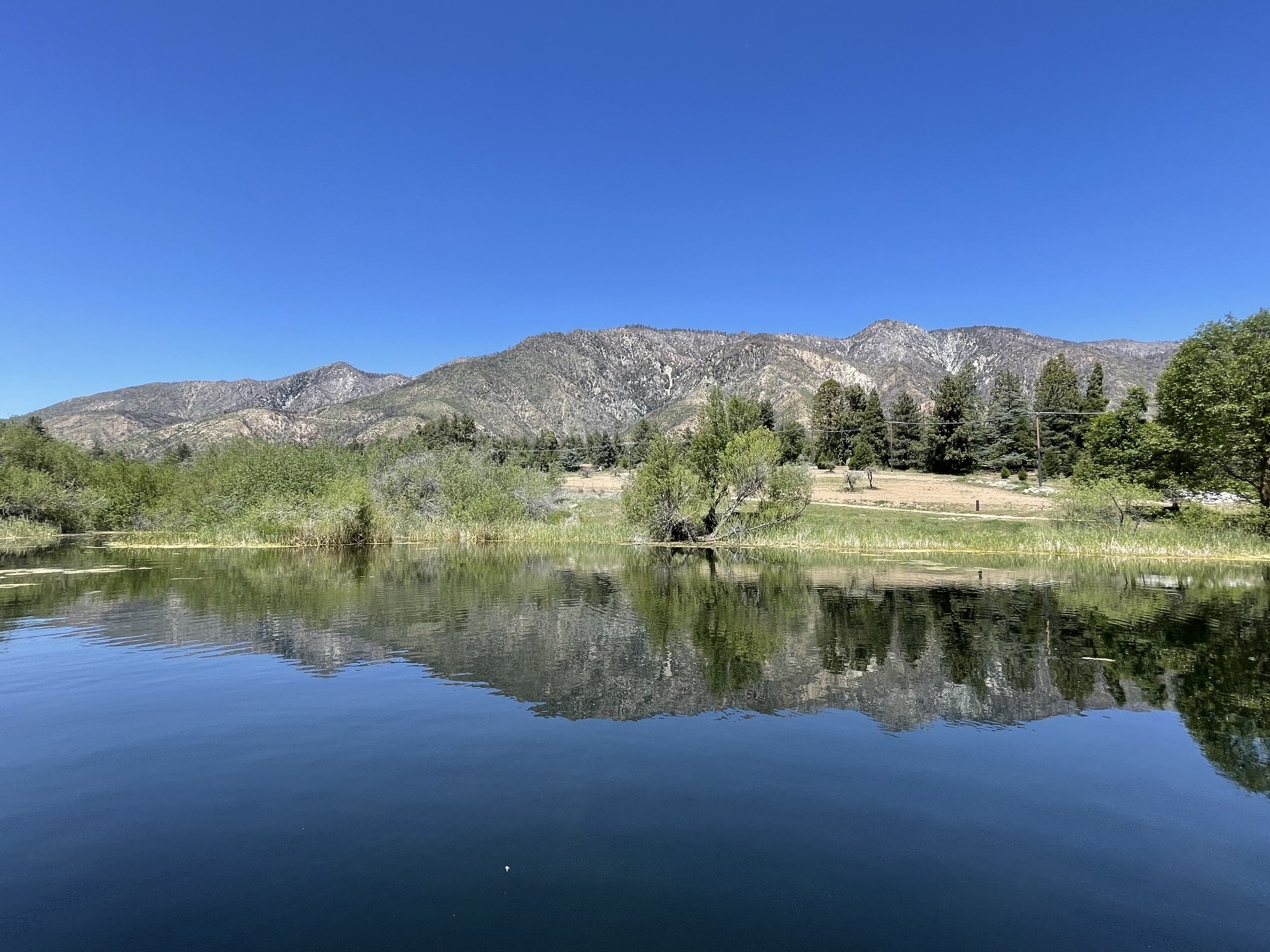
Oak Glen Preserve

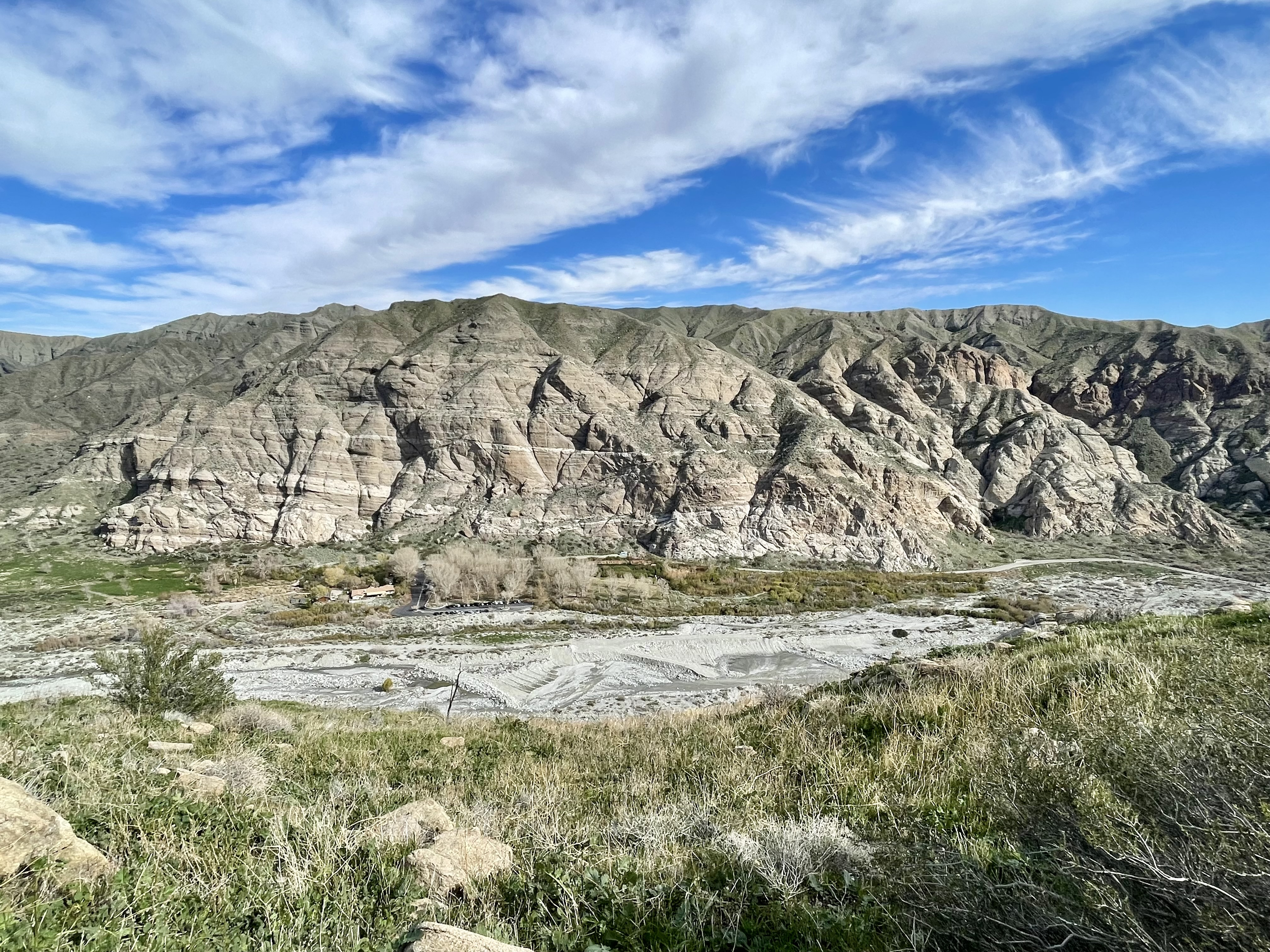
Whitewater Preserve

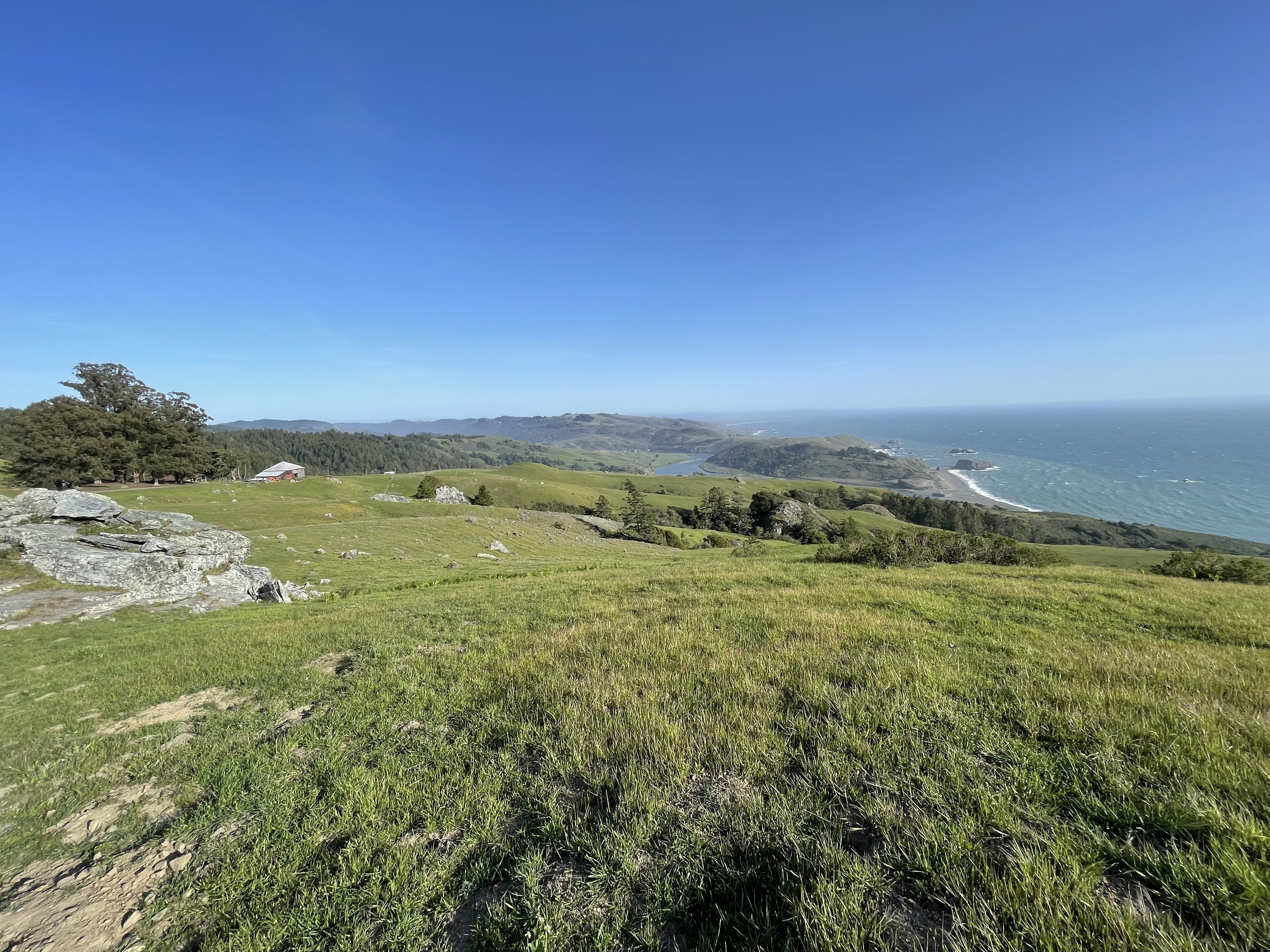
Jenner Headlands Preserve

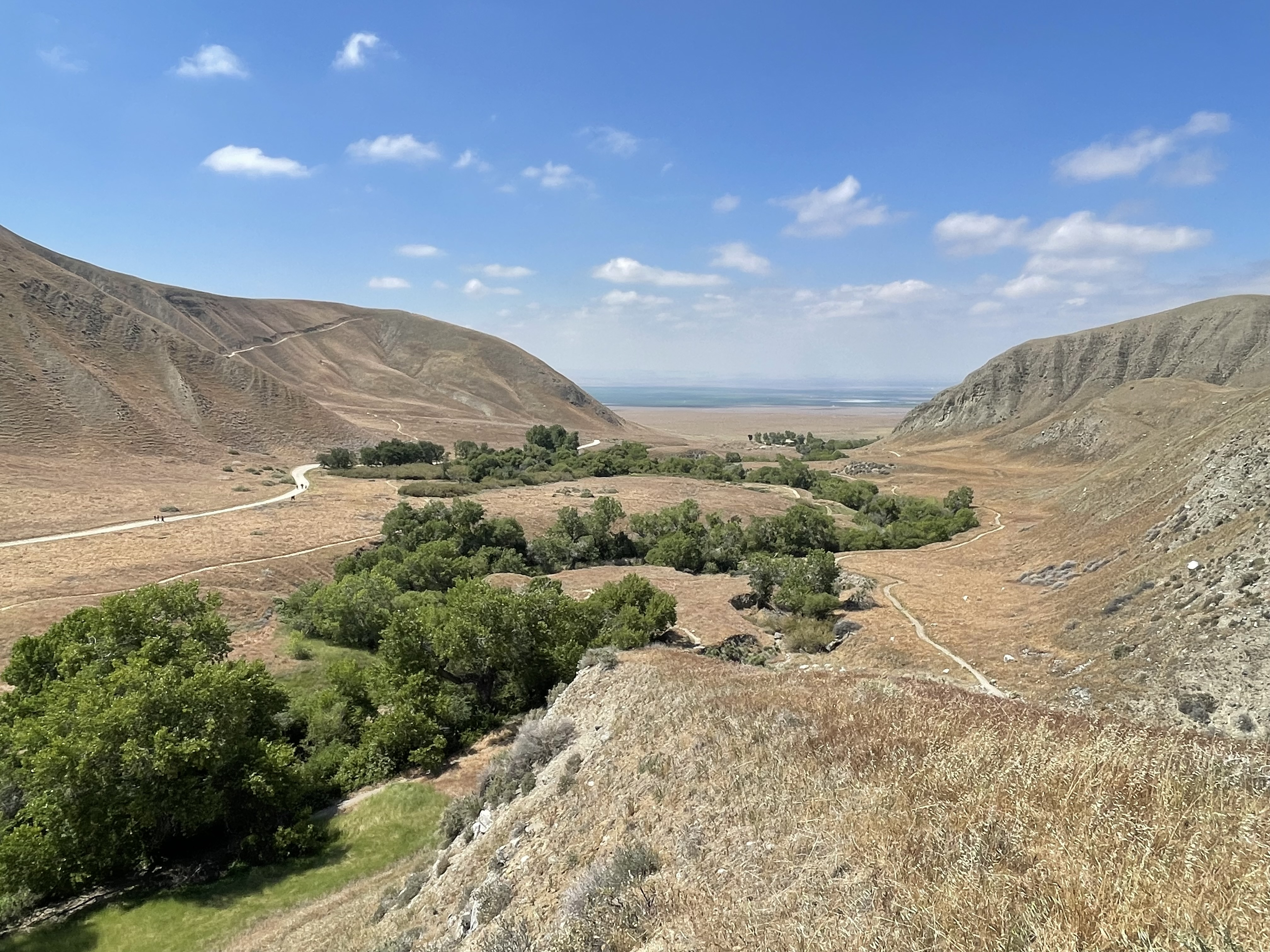
Wind Wolves Preserve

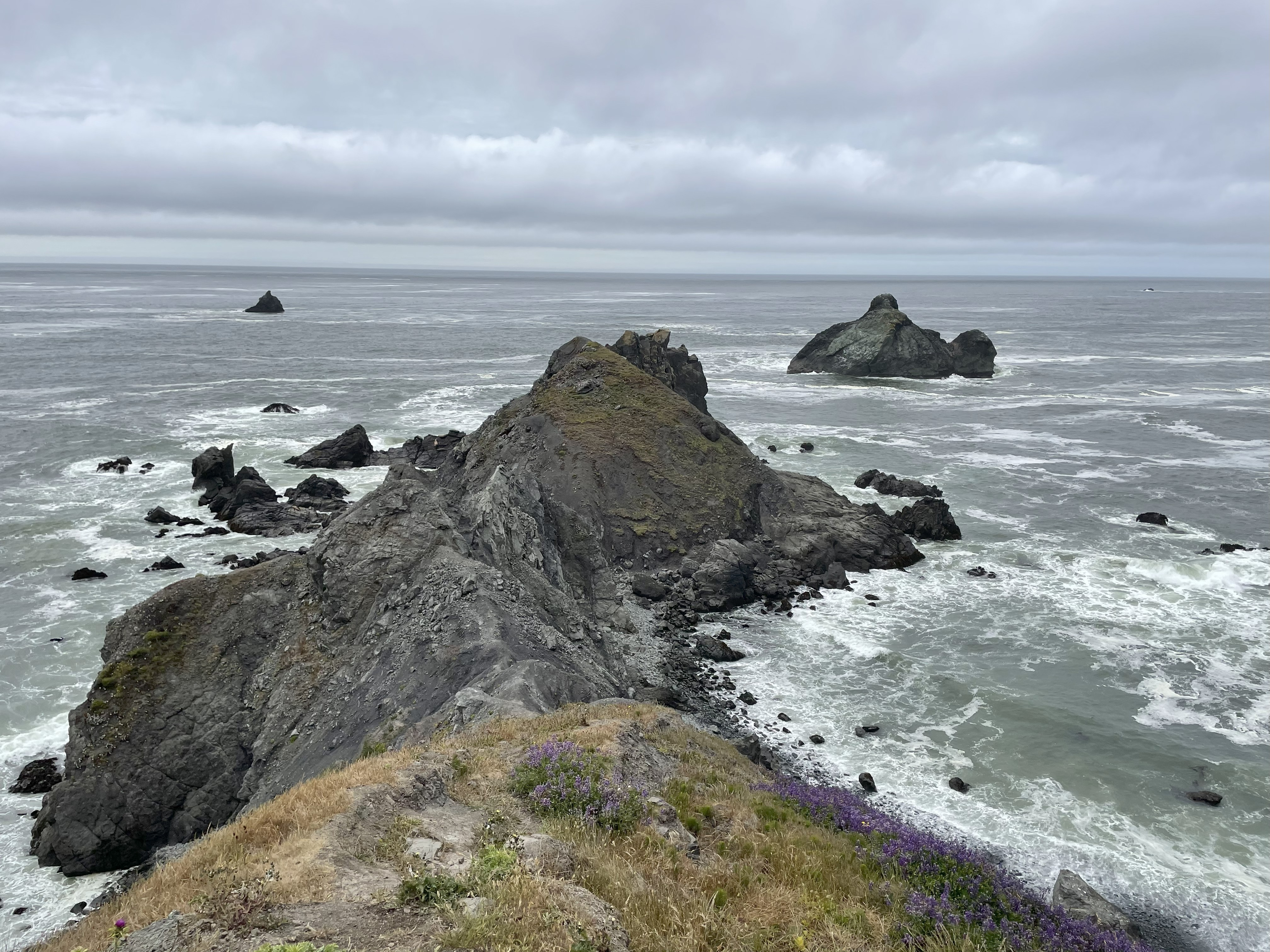
Seawood Cape Preserve

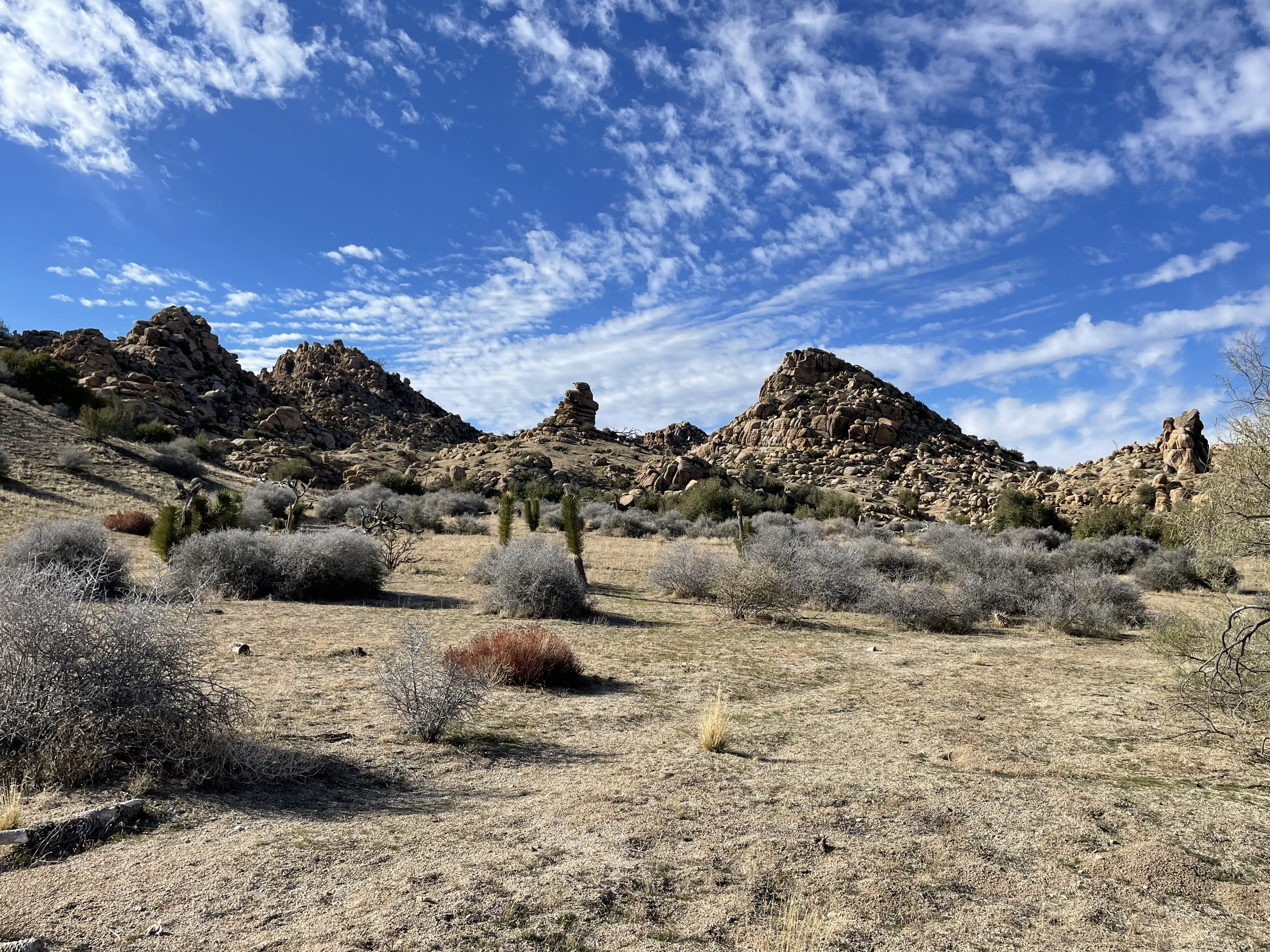
Pioneertown Mountains Preserve

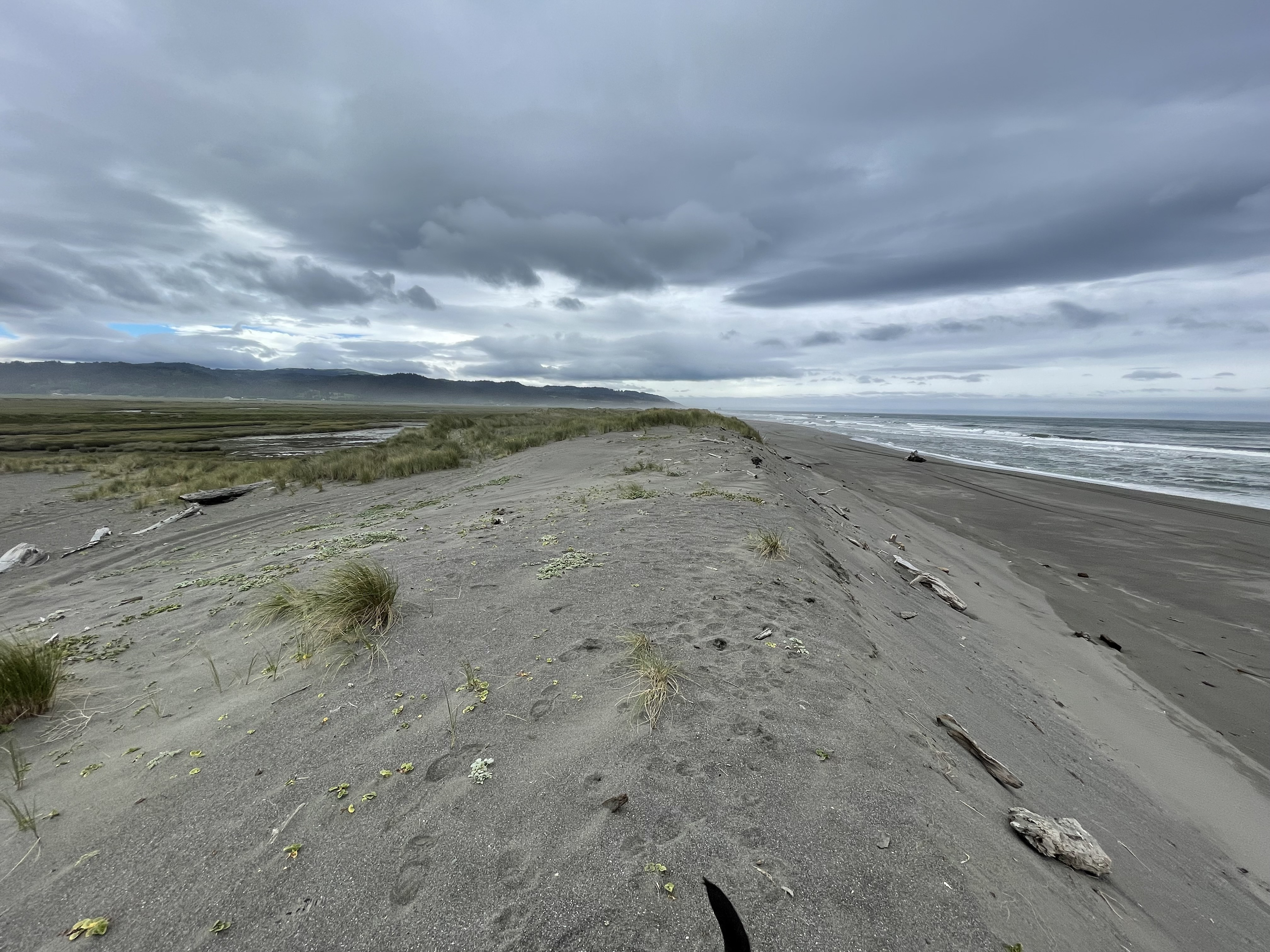
Sounding Seas Dunes Reserve

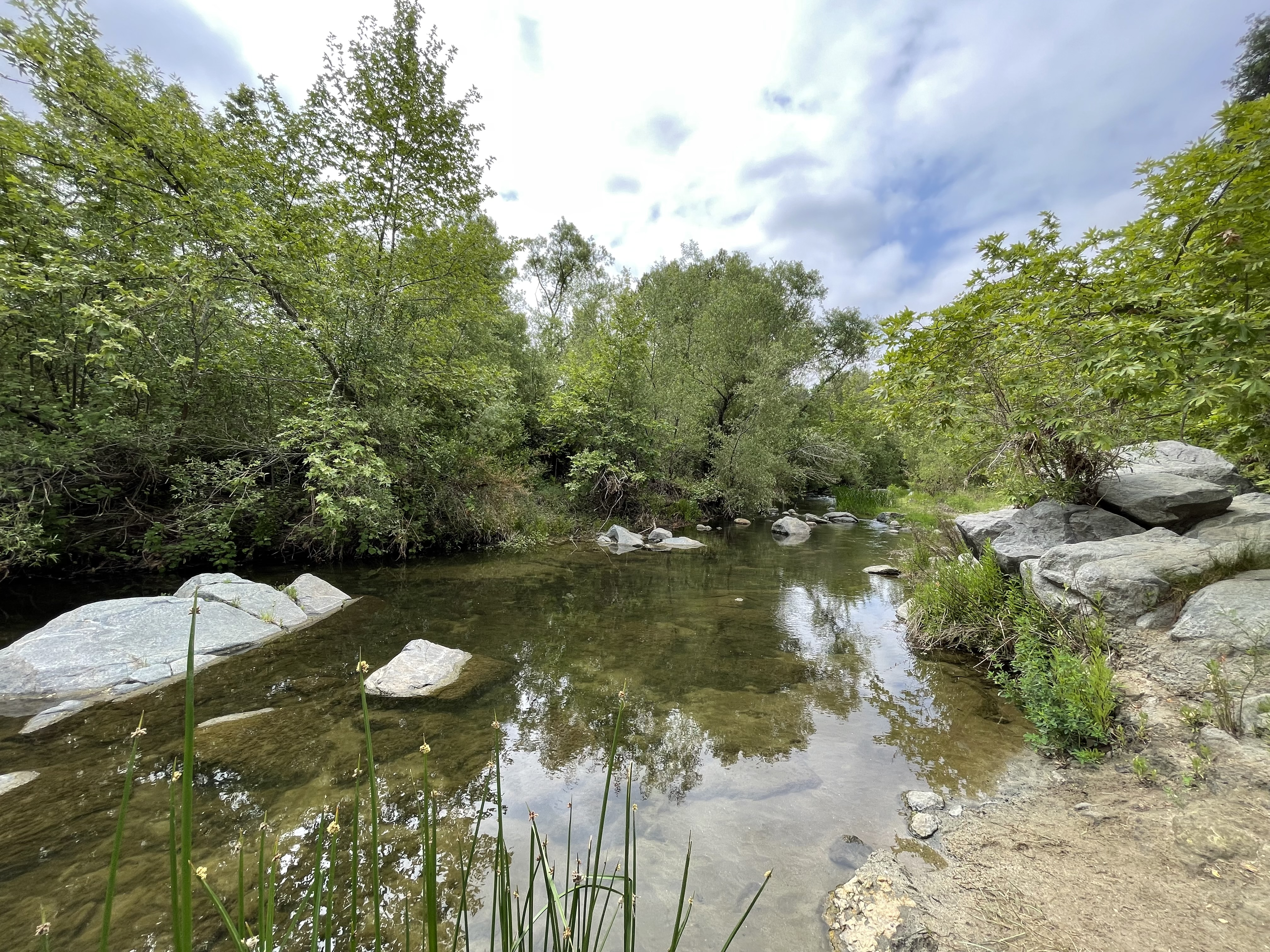
Santa Margarita River Trail Preserve

=== World Wildlife Fund (WWF) ecoregions ===
The Wildlands Conservancy’s preserves span 11 World Wildlife Fund (WWF) ecoregions in California, Oregon, and Utah.

WWF ecoregion	Preserves
California Central Valley grasslands	Wind Wolves
California coastal sage and chaparral	Santa Margarita River Trail; Mariposa
California interior chaparral and woodlands	Rana Creek
California montane chaparral and woodlands	Oak Glen; Galena Peak Wilderness; Bearpaw; Bluff Lake; Wind Wolves
Colorado Plateau shrublands	Speaking Springs (Utah)
Great Basin shrub steppe	West Walker River; Two Rivers
Klamath–Siskiyou forests	Beaver Valley Headwaters; Eel River Canyon; Emerald Waters; Spyrock
Mojave Desert	Pioneertown Mountains
Northern California coastal forests	Seawood Cape; Sounding Seas Dunes; Eel River Estuary; Jenner Headlands; Estero Americano Coast
Snake–Columbia shrub steppe	Enchanted Rocks (Oregon)
Sonoran Desert	Whitewater; Mission Creek

The preserve system includes lands associated with several major western rivers, including the Eel River, Scott River, Russian River, John Day River, and Santa Margarita River.

=== Audubon Important Bird Areas ===
Four Wildlands Conservancy preserves are located in regions designated as Important Bird Areas by the Audubon. These include Wind Wolves Preserve within the San Emigdio Mountains IBA, Santa Margarita River Trail Preserve within the Camp Pendleton IBA, Bearpaw Reserve within the Santa Ana River – Upper IBA, and West Walker River Preserve within the Topaz Lake IBA.

=== Geographic context ===
Some preserves are clustered geographically.

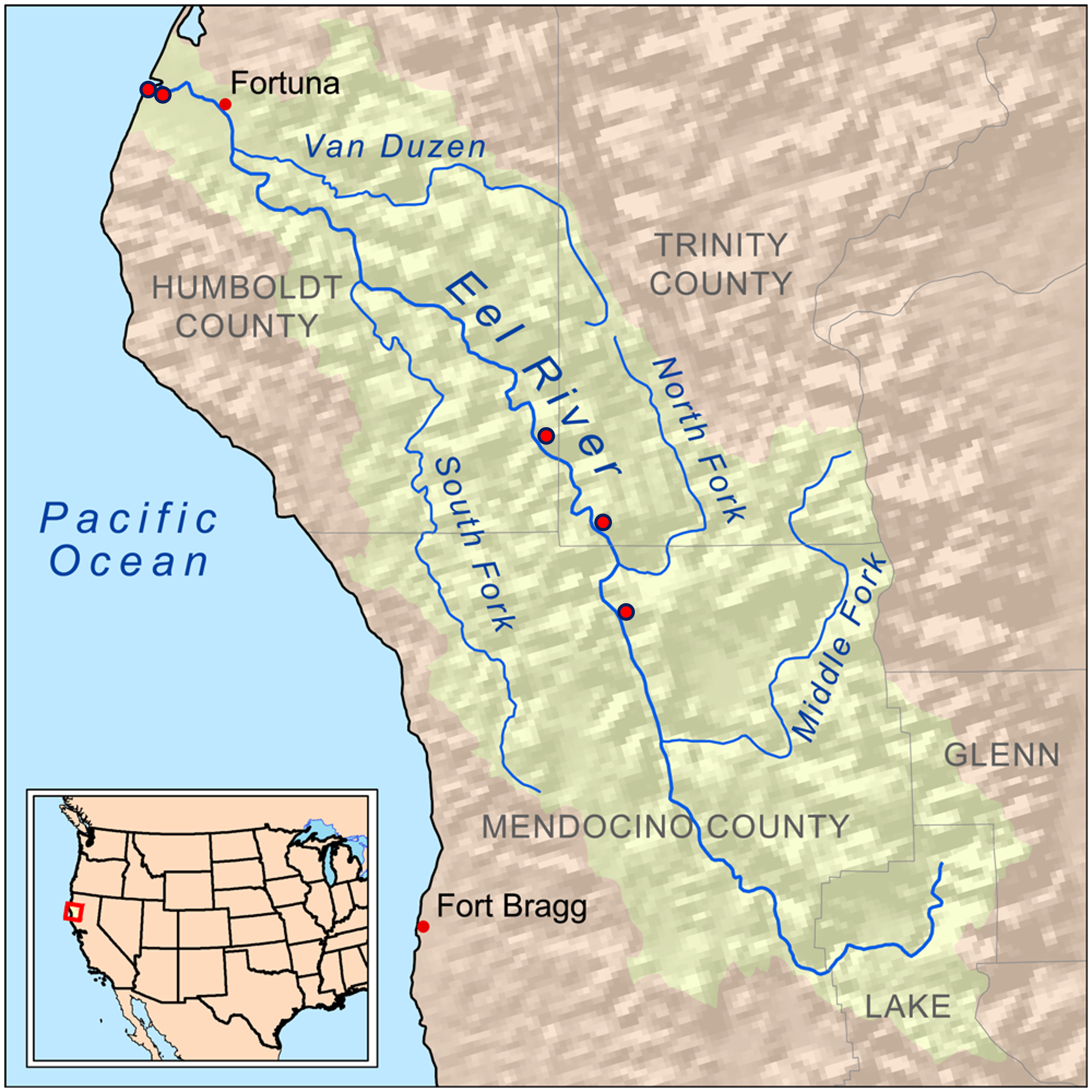
The Wildlands Conservancy preserves along the Eel River.

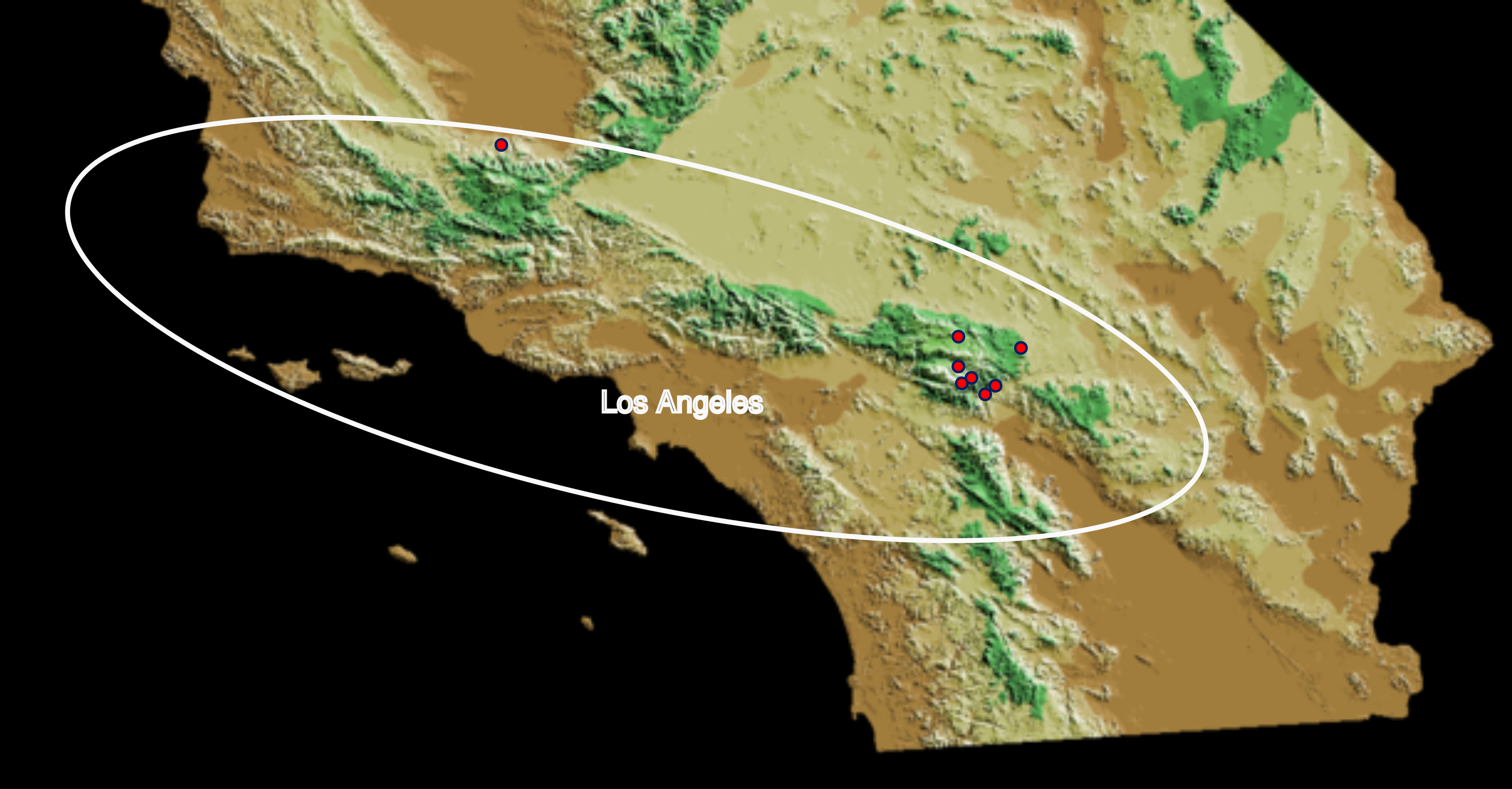
The Wildlands Conservancy preserves within the Transverse Ranges.

== Conservation ==
=== Conservation campaigns ===
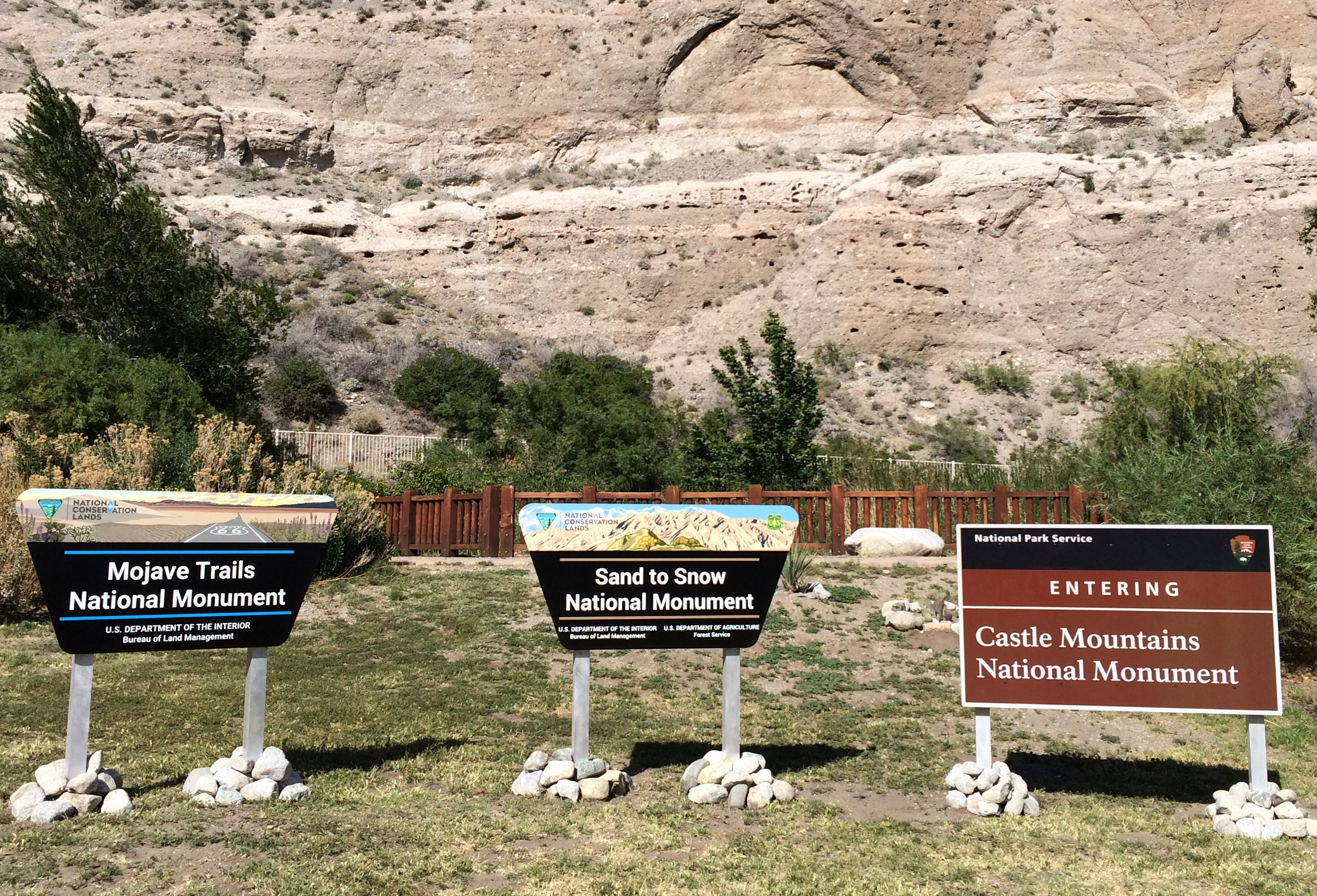
Signage at Sand to Snow National Monument following federal designation

From 1998 to 2004, The Wildlands Conservancy's California Desert Land Acquisition Project acquired and transferred more than 587,000 acres of former railroad and utility lands in the Mojave Desert to public ownership. The lands were added to the Mojave National Preserve, Joshua Tree National Park, and Bureau of Land Management holdings. Portions of these lands were later included in Mojave Trails National Monument and Sand to Snow National Monument.

The conservancy's Eel River Emerald Necklace project consists of a series of preserves along the Eel River in northern California.

In 1998, the conservancy started the Santa Ana River Renaissance, a project for a 110-mile trail along the Santa Ana River from the San Bernardino Mountains to the Pacific Ocean. In 2006, a tri-county Santa Ana River Trail and Parkway Policy Advisory Committee was formed, including the conservancy.

The conservancy participated in opposition to the proposed Green Path North transmission project, an 85-mile power corridor planned by the Los Angeles Department of Water and Power that was withdrawn in 2010.

=== Restoration ===
The conservancy participates in habitat restoration and species recovery projects across several preserves.

At the Eel River Estuary Preserve, restoration has focused on reconnecting tidal sloughs and wetlands in collaboration with regional partners. In the Scott River watershed, work at the Beaver Valley Headwaters Preserve has involved stream and habitat restoration as part of a broader restoration effort in the region.

Tule elk were reintroduced at Wind Wolves Preserve beginning in 1998 in a program led by the California Department of Fish and Wildlife. The preserve's tule elk population increased from 19 animals in 1998 to more than 400 by 2022.

=== Connectivity ===
The Wildlands Conservancy’s preserves are included in regional wildlife corridor planning. The South Coast Missing Linkages study identifies several linkages that include or adjoin conservancy-owned properties, including Wind Wolves Preserve, Pioneertown Mountains Preserve, Mission Creek Preserve, and Oak Glen Preserve.

The conservancy participated in acquisition of the Coal Canyon wildlife corridor linking Chino Hills State Park and the Cleveland National Forest.

== Education and public access ==
Outdoor education is a major component of The Wildlands Conservancy’s preserve system. The organization operates guided field trips and site-based educational programs at multiple preserves, with major education programs based at Wind Wolves Preserve, Oak Glen Preserve, and Whitewater Preserve, which maintain dedicated education staff and facilities for school field trips and community events. Additional preserves host smaller-scale public programs, guided hikes, and partnerships with nearby schools and community groups.

Public access to preserves operated by the conservancy is provided free of charge.

== Media and publications ==
- "Carmel Valley's Newest Preserve and Kern County's Tule Elk". OpenRoad. Episode 92. NBC Bay Area. April 7, 2024. NBC Bay Area. Retrieved May 5, 2024. OpenRoad had editorial control; The Wildlands Conservancy funded the episode.
- Stefan Van Norden (host) (June 26, 2023). "Episode 98: The Wildlands Conservancy – Behold the Beauty" (Podcast). Nature Revisited. Noorden Productions. Interview with Executive Director Frazier Haney. Official site.
- The Wildlands Conservancy (2021). Behold the Beauty (2nd ed.). The Wildlands Conservancy. Official site.
- Jack Thompson (The Wildlands Conservancy) (April 19, 2016). Public lecture: Inside the California Desert's Newest National Monuments (Video). Rancho Mirage Library & Observatory. YouTube.
