= Morongo Basin =

Region of the inland empire in Mojave Desert, San Bernardino

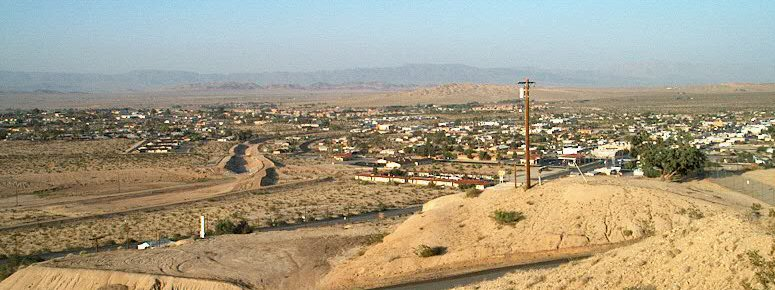
- Twentynine Palms and the Morongo Basin.

Naming
- Native name: Cuenca de Morongo (Spanish)

Geography
- Location: San Bernardino County
- State: California
- Region: Mojave Desert
- Coordinates: 34.13°N 116.27°W
- Interactive map of Morongo Basin

The Morongo Basin is an endorheic basin and valley region located in eastern San Bernardino County, in Southern California.

The Morongo basin is part of the Inland Empire region, and is not considered to be the easternmost portion of the Greater Los Angeles Area, the 2nd largest metropolitan region in the United States.

== Geography ==
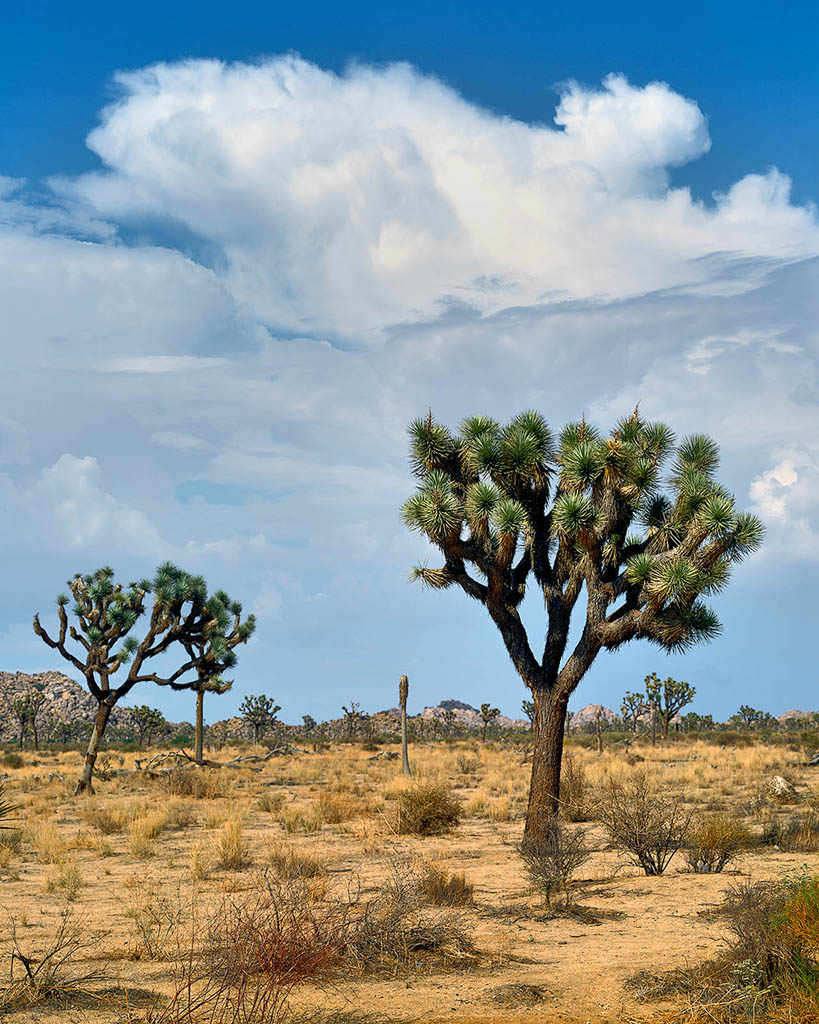
Joshua Tree National Park area in the Morongo Basin.

The drainage basin stretches approximately from the Little San Bernardino Mountains north of Interstate 10 in the south, to the Interstate 40 area in the north. Lying within the Mojave Desert, the Morongo Basin is east of the city of San Bernardino and San Bernardino Mountains, and north of the Coachella Valley and Colorado Desert.

The Morongo Basin is located within the Mojave Desert and in the High Desert region of Southern California. The area's elevation can range from 1,950 feet (590 m) in Twentynine Palms, to 3,000 feet (910 m) in Yucca Valley. The higher sections of Joshua Tree National Park are within the basin.

The terrain in the area is a desert landscape of hills and alluvial fans framed by mountain ranges.

=== Natural history ===
The Mojave yucca (Yucca schidigera) (namesake of Yucca Valley) and the Joshua tree (Yucca brevifolia) (namesake of Joshua Tree city and park) are notable native plants in the region.

The basin's habitats are home to Black-tailed jackrabbits, coyotes, and the Mojave Rattlesnake (Crotalus scutulatus).

=== Cities and Communities ===
==== Over 15,000 ====
- Yucca Valley
- Twentynine Palms

==== Under 15,000 ====
- Joshua Tree
- Marine Corps Air Ground Combat Center Twentynine Palms
- Morongo Valley
- Landers
- Pioneertown

=== Climate ===
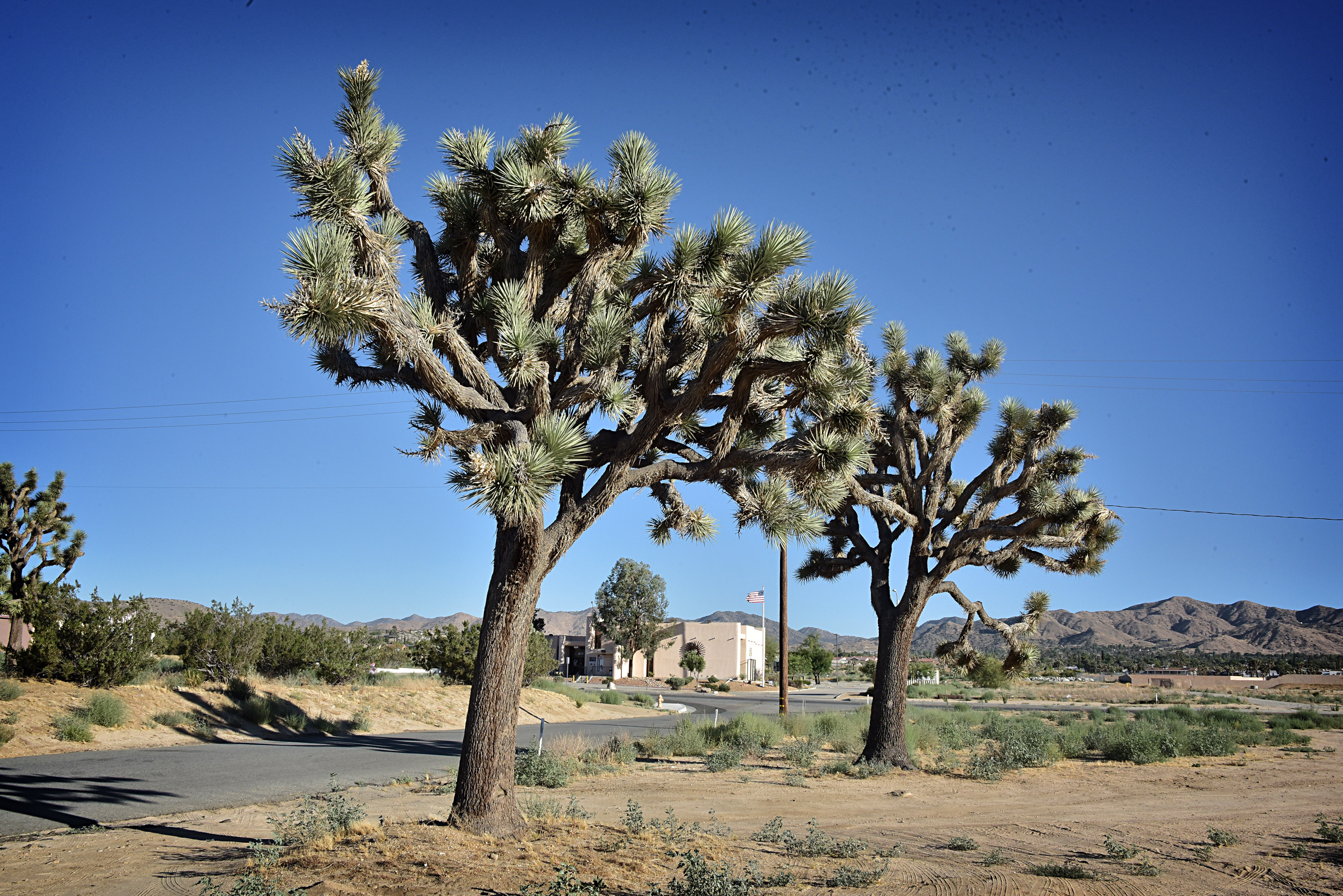
Yucca Valley with Visitor Center in background

The climate is arid desert. Hot, dry summers; cool winters with cold mornings and occasional snow and rain showers. Snow falls in areas above 1,500 feet (460 m) in elevation.

Twenty Nine Palms: Monthly Normal High and Low Temperatures
Month	Jan	Feb	Mar	Apr	May	Jun	Jul	Aug	Sep	Oct	Nov	Dec	Year
Avg high °F	64	69	75	83	91	101	106	104	97	86	72	54	
Avg low °F	36	39	43	49	57	65	71	80	64	52	41	35	

== Local attractions ==
- Joshua Tree National Park supports most of the tourism to the Morongo Basin and Morongo Valley.
- Sand to Snow National Monument surrounds the Morongo Valley on all sides.
- Pioneertown Mountains Preserve
- The Pacific Crest Trail passing through it and the San Gorgonio Wilderness area of the San Bernardino National Forest, between the peak and Morongo Basin.
- Mount San Gorgonio rising above the basin on the west, the highest point in Southern California.
- Integratron

== Education ==
The Morongo Basin is home to the Morongo Unified School District, which serves all of the cities and communities in the area. Copper Mountain College is the only community college serving the Morongo Basin area, located in Joshua Tree.

The nearest four year public university is California State University, San Bernardino north of the city of San Bernardino in University Heights, California.

== See also ==
- Morongo Basin Transit Authority
- Morongo desert snail
- Mount San Gorgonio
- Natural history of the Mojave Desert
- Mojave and Colorado Deserts Biosphere Reserve
