= Mission Creek Preserve =

Nature preserve in Riverside County, California

- IUCN category V (protected landscape/seascape)
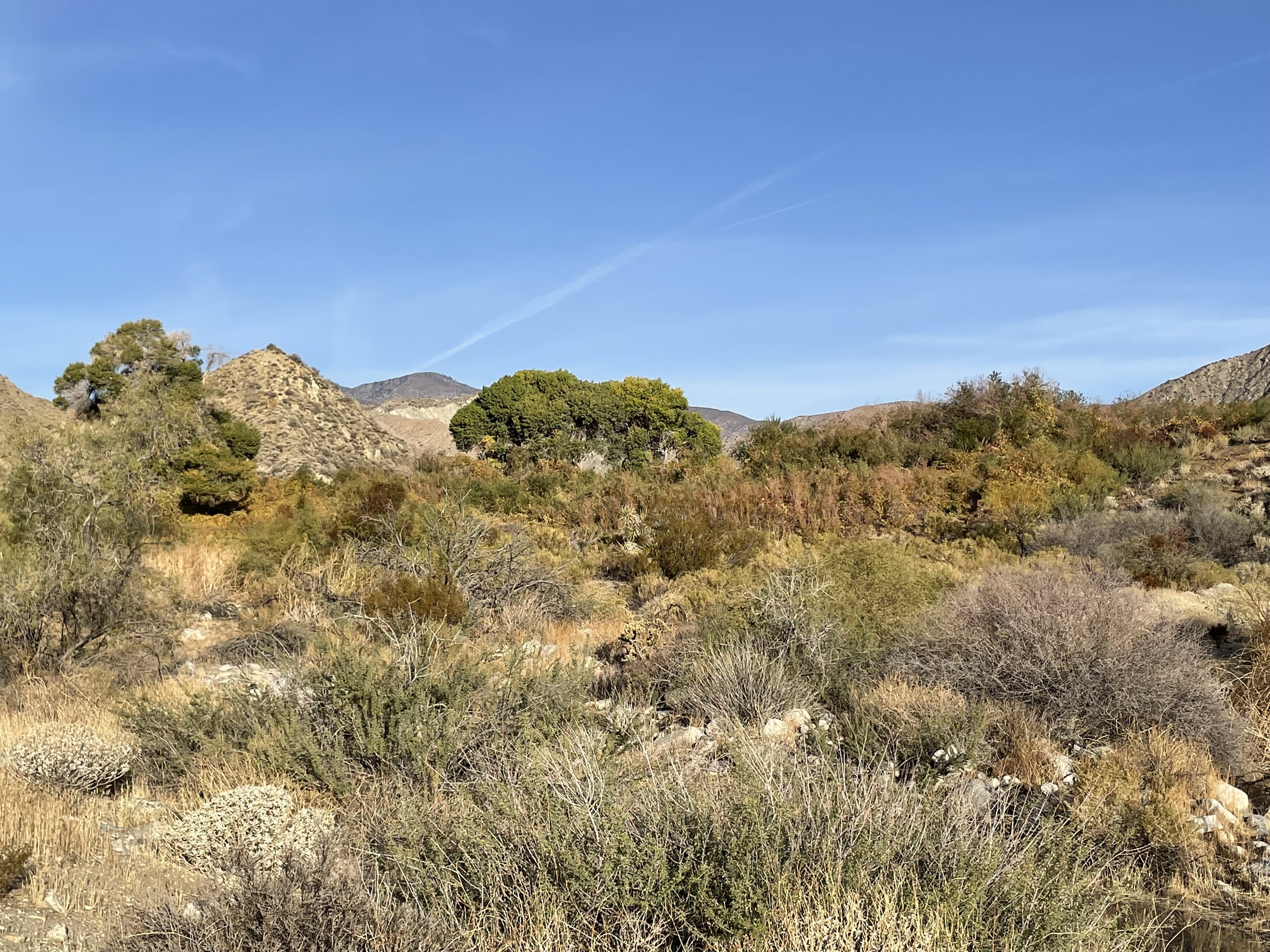
- Wetlands

- Location within California
- Interactive map of Mission Creek Preserve
- Location: Riverside County, California
- Nearest city: Morongo Valley, California
- Coordinates: 34°1′0″N 116°37′41″W
- Area: 4,760 acres (1,930 ha)
- Max. elevation: 2,800 ft (850 m)
- Min. elevation: 1,900 ft (580 m)
- Created: 1997
- Operator: The Wildlands Conservancy
- Website: Mission Creek Preserve

Mission Creek Preserve is a nature preserve in the San Bernardino Mountains, within the Sand to Snow National Monument, noted for desert wetlands and riparian habitat in a transition zone between the Mojave Desert and Sonoran Desert. A ciénega supports cottonwood–willow vegetation, and a trail ascends to a ridge that connects to the Pacific Crest Trail and offers views into Whitewater Canyon. The 4,760 acres (1,930 ha) preserve is owned and managed by The Wildlands Conservancy as part of its system of preserves.

== Geography ==
Mission Creek Preserve sits in a transition zone between the Mojave Desert and Sonoran Desert, resulting in flora and fauna from both deserts. Painted Hills Wetland, shown on preserve maps, is a broad wetland area that supports cottonwoods and other riparian vegetation; additional riparian patches occur along Mission Creek in the canyon. The preserve lies near the San Gorgonio Wilderness and forms part of the federally designated Sand to Snow National Monument.

A spring-fed ciénega within the preserve—shown on The Wildlands Conservancy maps as the Painted Hills Wetland—supports a broad cottonwood–willow riparian patch about 1,000 ft (300 m) wide; most of the area was dry during 2014 surveys. The Mission Creek strand of the San Andreas Fault runs through the region; paleoseismic and geomorphic studies document Quaternary activity on this strand near the preserve. Downstream of the preserve, the Mission Creek fault acts as a groundwater barrier; where the water table drops below the surface, vegetation becomes sparse in the lower wash. The preserve overlies the Mission Creek groundwater subbasin; regional plans identify the Mission Creek and Banning faults as barrier features and note natural recharge from Mission Creek and nearby Morongo-area drainages.

Geologic mapping presented at Geological Society of America meetings reports reverse faulting associated with the Mission Creek strand near the preserve and continuing toward the Whitewater River.

== Flora and fauna ==
Habitats include riparian zones, desert washes, and adjacent mountain slopes. The wetlands provide habitat for the endangered least Bell's vireo and southwestern willow flycatcher. Large mammals recorded in the preserve include desert bighorn sheep, mountain lions, and black bears.

As of 2025, over 200 bird species have been reported on eBird for the Mission Creek Preserve hotspot.

Painted Hills Wetland is a heavily vegetated riparian area with giant cottonwoods, as labeled on the preserve map.

Spring wildflowers can be notable in wet years; local reporting has highlighted displays at the preserve during strong bloom seasons.

Regional bioassessment work notes that non-perennial desert streams and spring-fed oases provide important riparian habitat refugia in the Colorado Desert.

== History ==
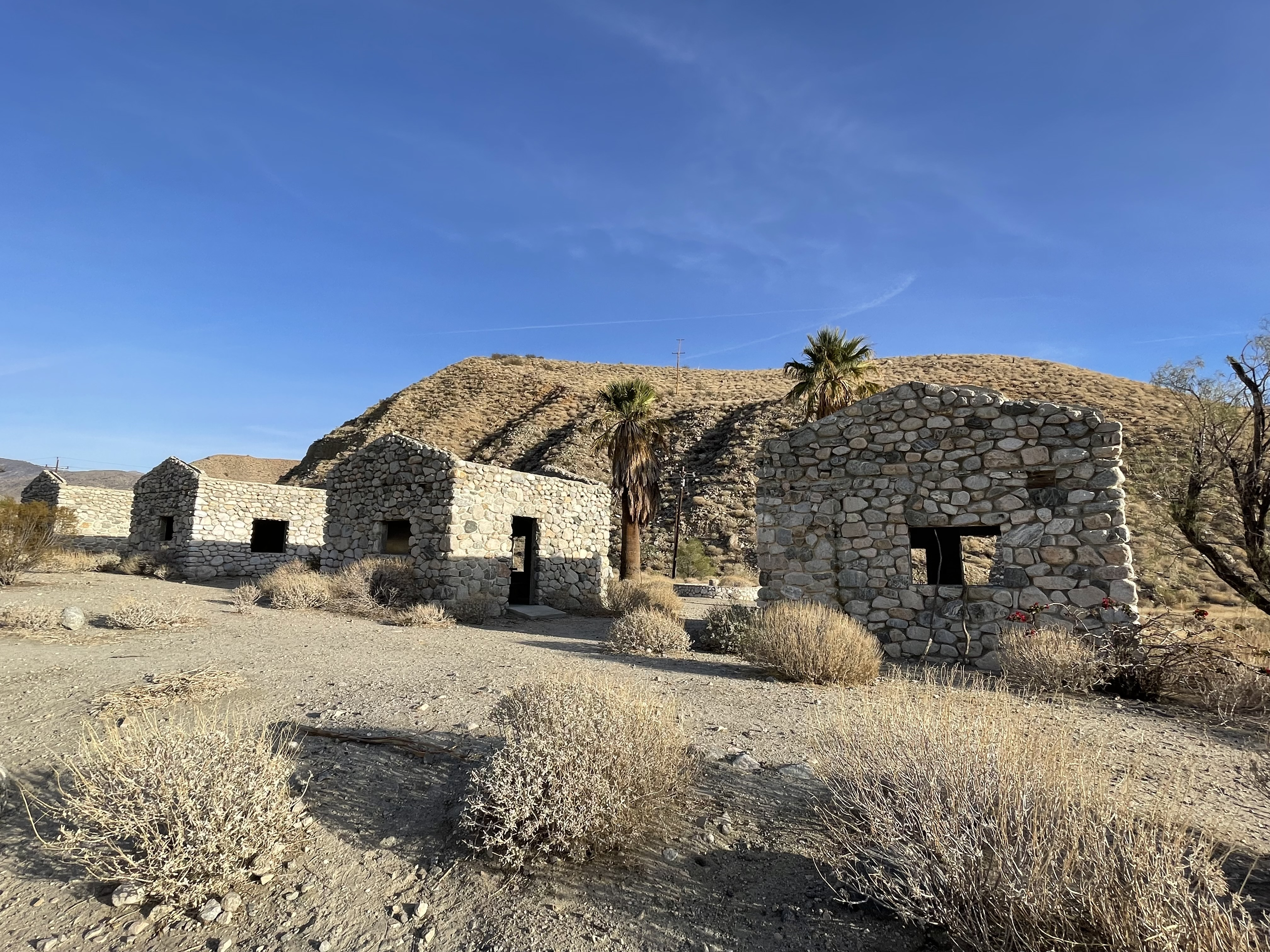
Historic stone resort buildings

In the early 20th century the site hosted a guest ranch, with stone cabins and a small swimming pool; remnants are still visible near the entrance.

In 1997, The Wildlands Conservancy acquired the property and opened it for low-impact public recreation. The area was included within Sand to Snow National Monument upon its designation in 2016.

In August 2023, the remnants of Hurricane Hilary produced extreme rainfall in the region, with a storm-total maximum of 13.07 in (332 mm) reported at Upper Mission Creek; roads and trails in and near the preserve sustained damage.

== Conservation ==
Mission Creek Preserve contributes to regional landscape connectivity between desert and montane habitats in the Sand to Snow region. The preserve lies within a regional wildlife linkage identified in the South Coast Missing Linkages plan.

Groundwater in the Mission Creek Subbasin is jointly managed by Mission Springs Water District, Desert Water Agency, and Coachella Valley Water District under a Sustainable Groundwater Management Act (SGMA) alternative plan with annual reporting.

The area also contributes to the regional reserve system implemented under the Coachella Valley Multiple Species Habitat Conservation Plan, which provides for coordinated management and monitoring across the valley.

== Recreation ==
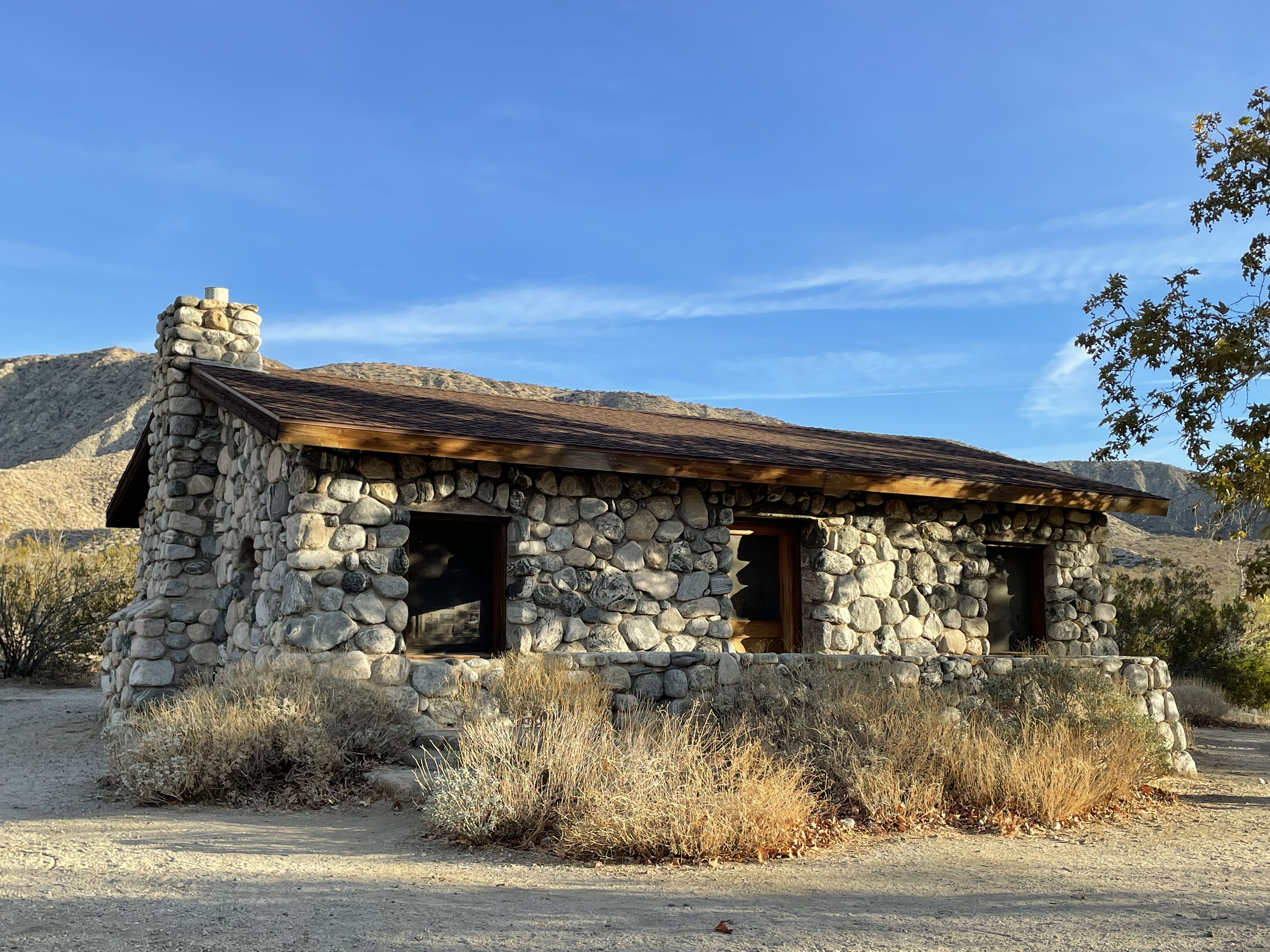
Stone House visitor building

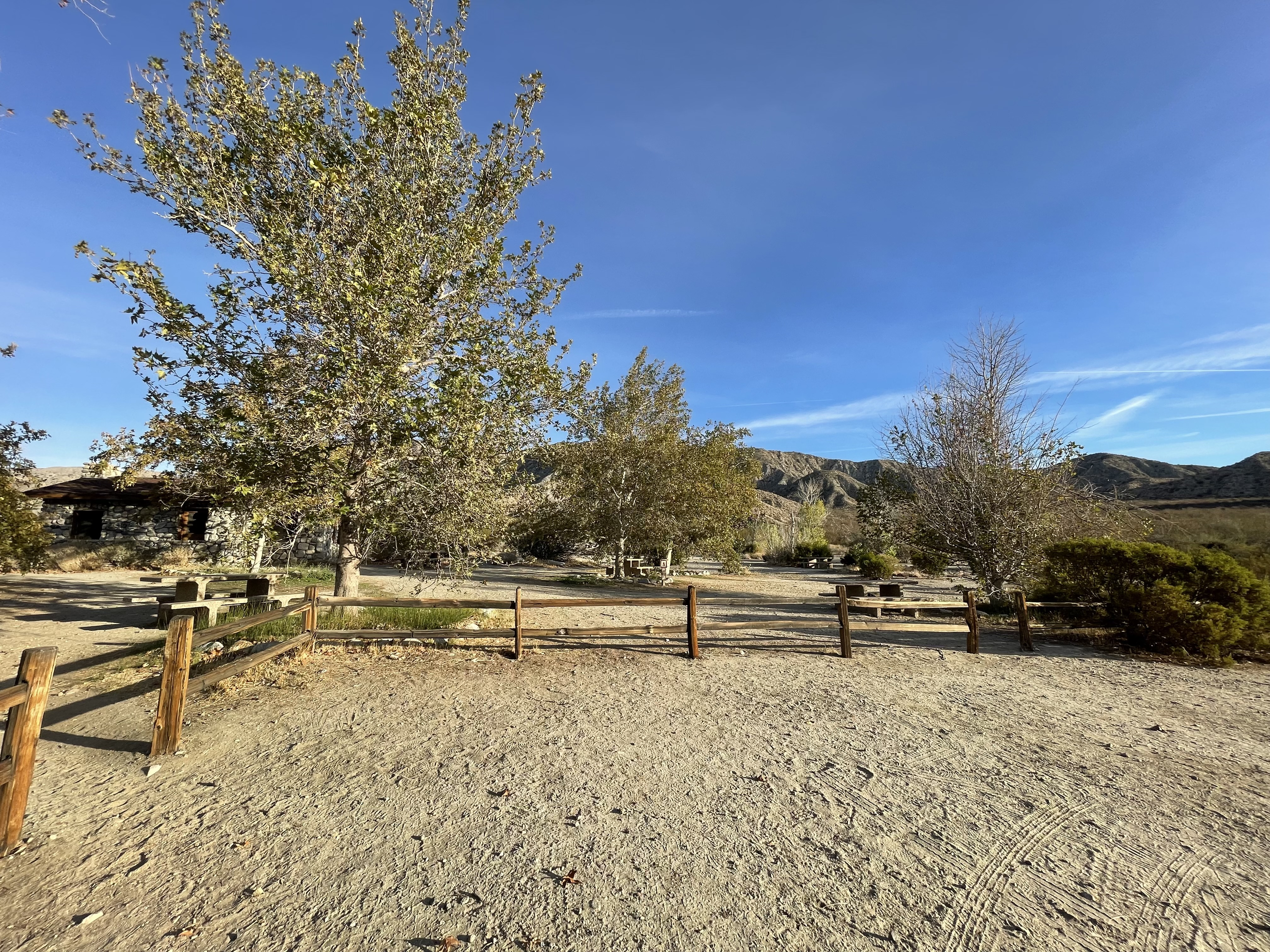
Campground picnic area

Visitors may park at the entrance gate and walk the canyon road, or arrange vehicle access beyond the gate to reach the Stone House area.

Just beyond the entrance are historic stone resort buildings with picnic tables. The road generally parallels Mission Creek and passes the Painted Hills Wetland on the opposite slope, a densely vegetated area noted by birders.

At the Stone House, interpretive materials, restrooms with flush toilets, potable water, and a walk-in campground with picnic tables are provided.

Beyond this point the route becomes a trail that climbs to the Pacific Crest Trail: southbound it descends into Whitewater Canyon and reaches Whitewater Preserve, while northbound it arrives at the San Gorgonio Overlook with views toward San Gorgonio Mountain.

A Los Angeles Times feature highlights the Mission Creek–Whitewater hike for canyon scenery and seasonal wildflowers.

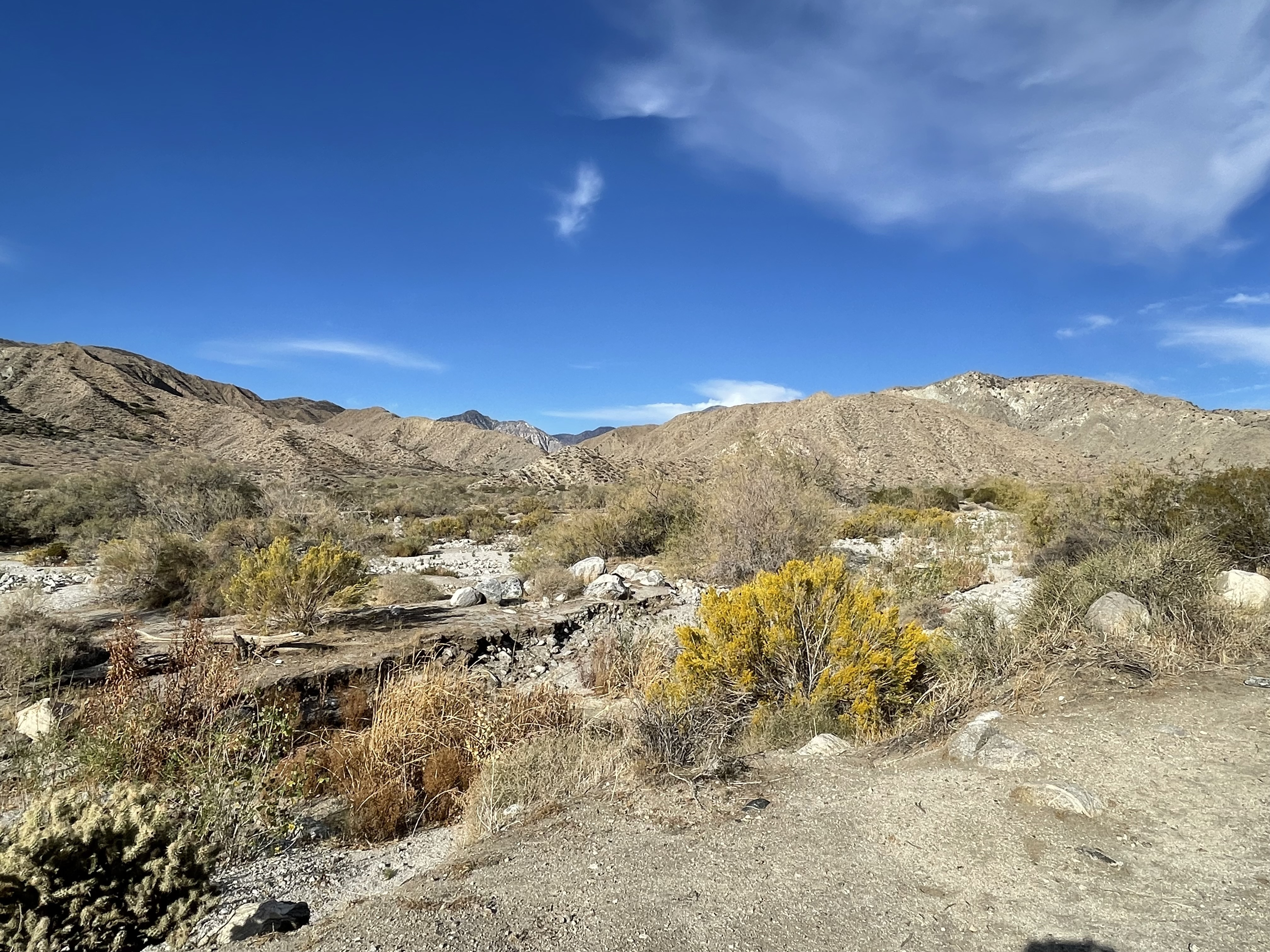
Early canyon view

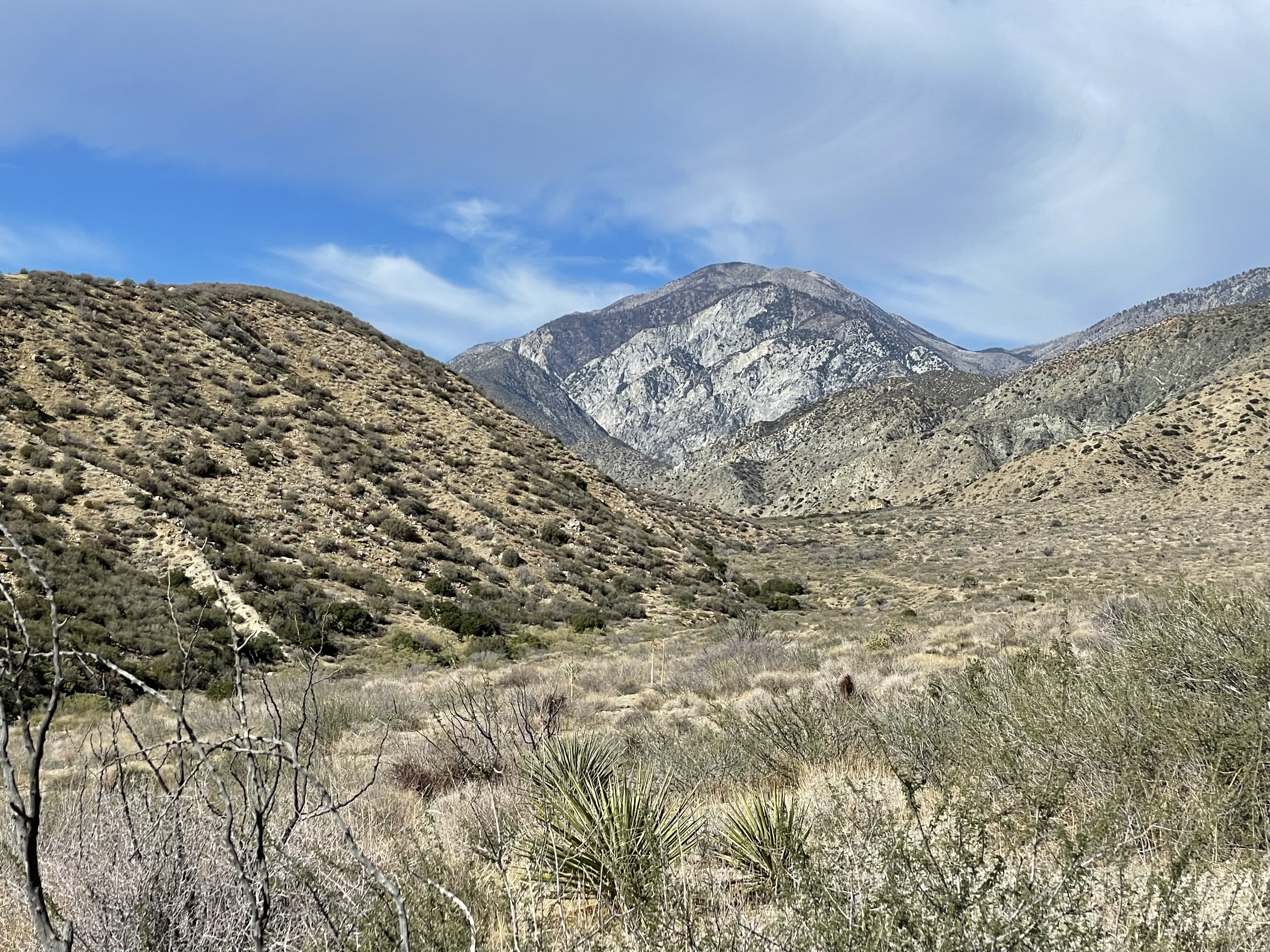
San Gorgonio from the overlook

== Education and programs ==
The Wildlands Conservancy runs its free Outdoor Discovery Program at Mission Creek as part of its Desert Preserves offerings (Mission Creek, Whitewater, and Pioneertown Mountains). The naturalist-led field trips are aligned with Next Generation Science Standards and focus on desert ecology and hydrology through a 1–2 mile hike and hands-on activities for K–12 groups. The program has received local press coverage highlighting its role in expanding access to outdoor learning in the Coachella Valley.

Community groundwater education in the Mission Creek Subbasin is supported by Mission Springs Water District’s Groundwater Guardian program.

== See also ==
- List of The Wildlands Conservancy preserves
- Pioneertown Mountains Preserve
- Whitewater Preserve
- Sand to Snow National Monument
