= Whitewater Preserve =

Nature preserve in Riverside County, California

- IUCN category V (protected landscape/seascape)
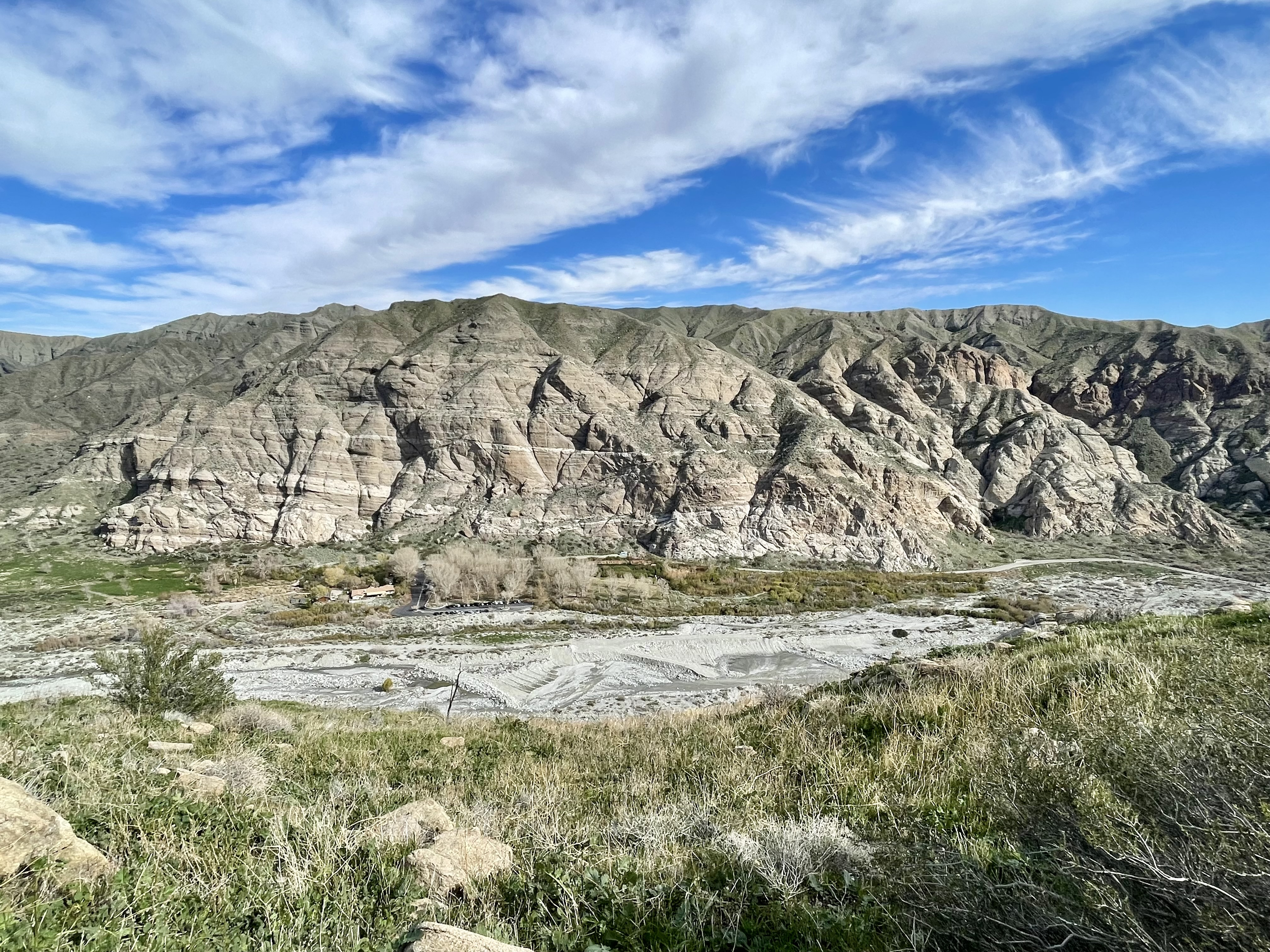
- Canyon View

- Location within California
- Interactive map of Whitewater Preserve
- Location: Riverside County, California
- Nearest city: Whitewater, California
- Coordinates: 33°59′19″N 116°39′22″W
- Area: 2,246 acres (909 ha)
- Max. elevation: 3,050 ft (930 m)
- Min. elevation: 2,075 ft (632 m)
- Created: 2005
- Operator: The Wildlands Conservancy
- Website: Whitewater Preserve

Whitewater Preserve is a nature preserve in the San Bernardino Mountains, within the Sand to Snow National Monument, centered on the perennial Whitewater River and its steep canyon walls. The riparian corridor supports desert bighorn sheep and endangered birds. A trail from the preserve connects with the Pacific Crest Trail, and the property adjoins the Bureau of Land Management’s San Gorgonio Wilderness. The 2,246 acres (909 ha) preserve is owned by The Wildlands Conservancy as part of its system of preserves.

== Geography ==
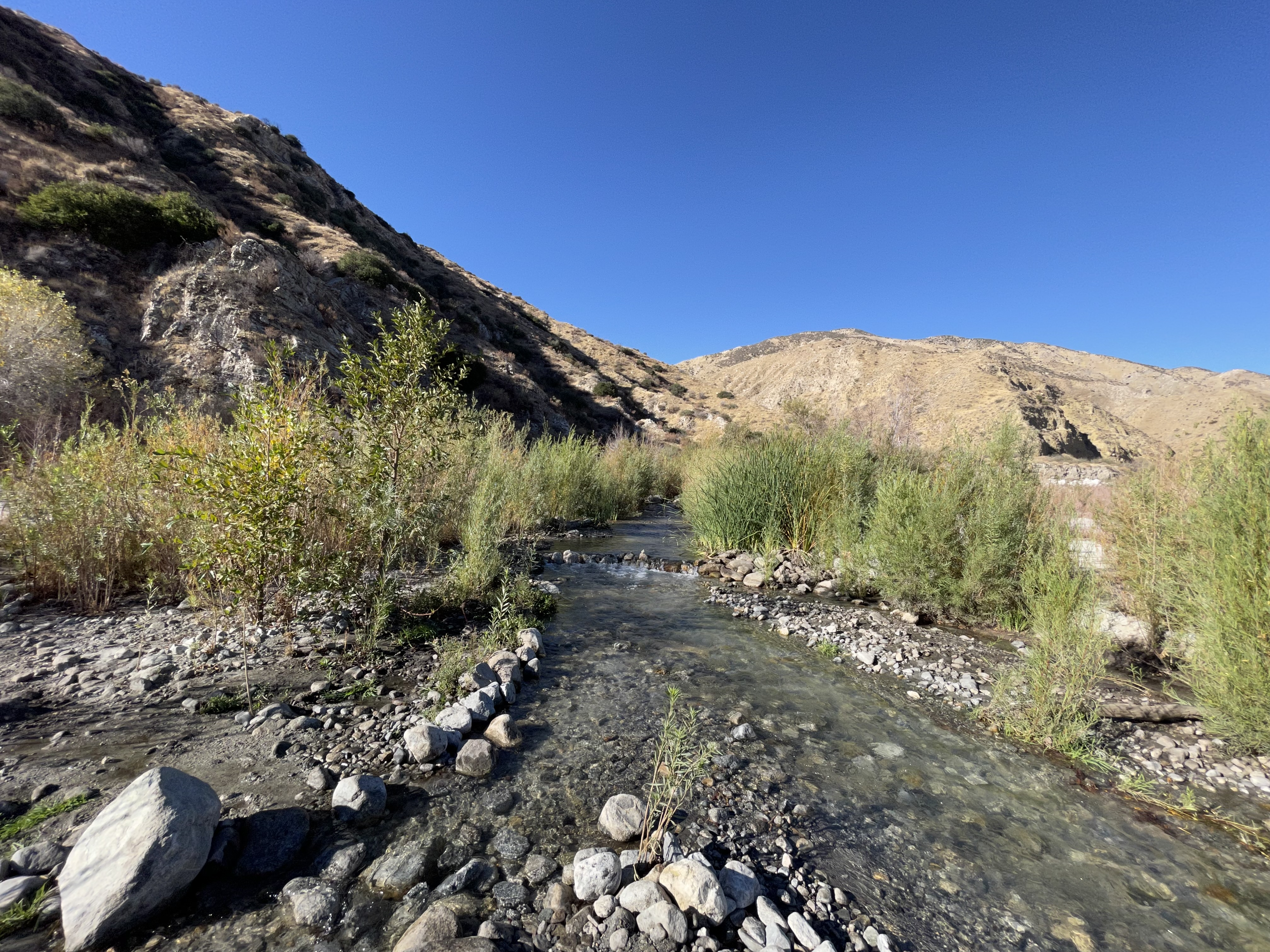
Whitewater River

The preserve sits where the Mojave Desert and Sonoran Desert meet. The Whitewater River flows year-round from San Gorgonio Mountain through the canyon, although after major storms debris sometimes buries the surface channel, causing flows to run underground until the riverbed reforms and snowmelt or groundwater recharge restore visible flow. The canyon is also subject to periodic flooding after heavy mountain rains, which can alter channels and affect access. The preserve is surrounded by the Bureau of Land Management’s San Gorgonio Wilderness and forms a wildlife corridor to the San Jacinto Mountains. Whitewater River is part of the National Wild and Scenic Rivers System, designated in 2019 under the John D. Dingell Jr. Conservation, Management, and Recreation Act.

== Flora and fauna ==
The preserve provides riparian habitat for endangered birds including the southwestern willow flycatcher and the least Bell’s vireo, confirmed through regional monitoring reports. Migrating species such as the summer tanager and vermilion flycatcher are also observed. Over 200 bird species have been recorded in the area according to eBird data.

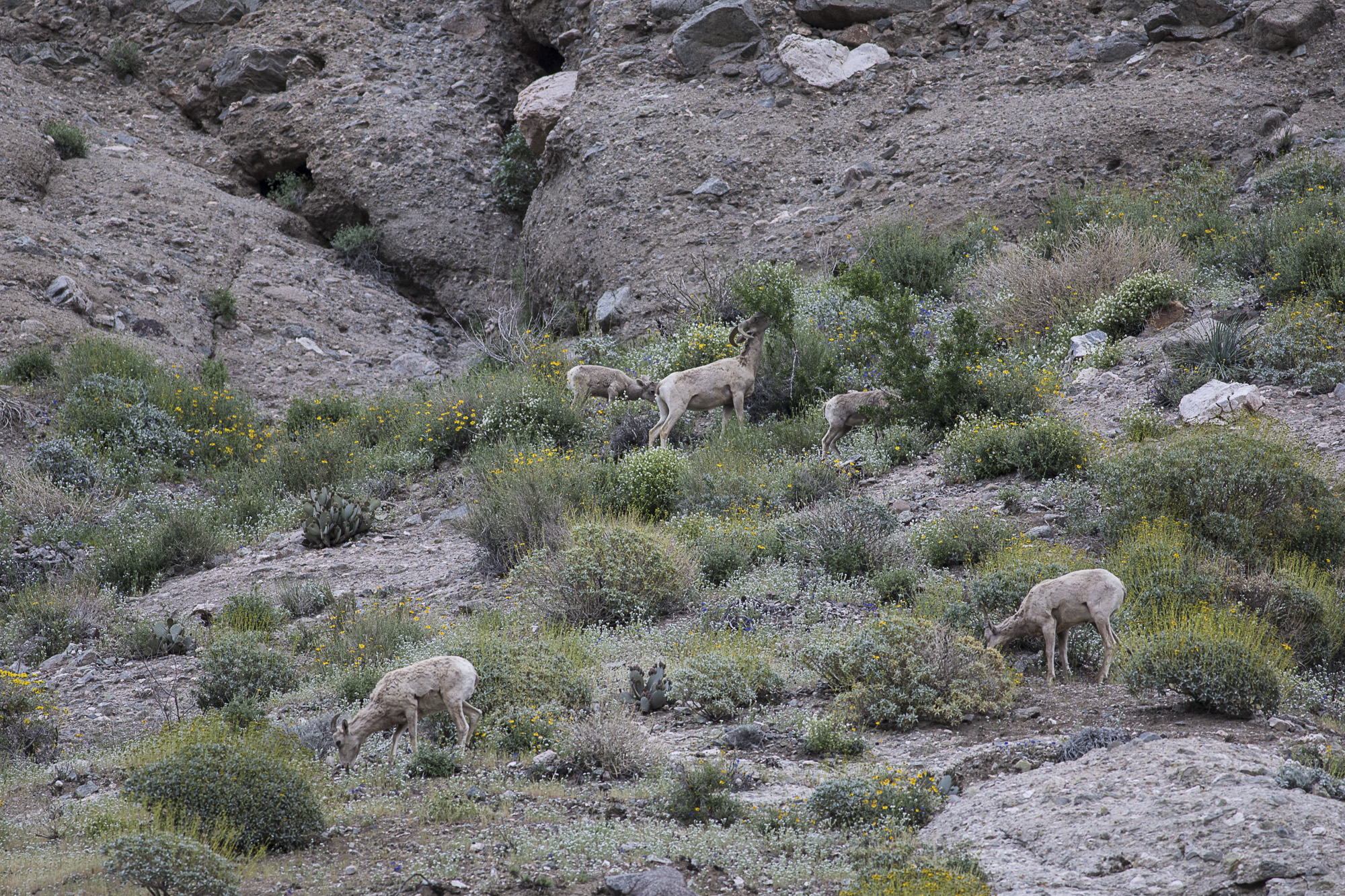
Bighorn sheep

Large mammals include desert bighorn sheep, deer, black bear, mountain lions, bobcats, and coyotes. Reptiles and amphibians are also present. The cliffs provide reliable viewing opportunities for bighorn sheep.

In wet years, the canyon supports extensive wildflower blooms, including California poppies, bush poppies, goldfields, and yellow brittlebush.

== History ==
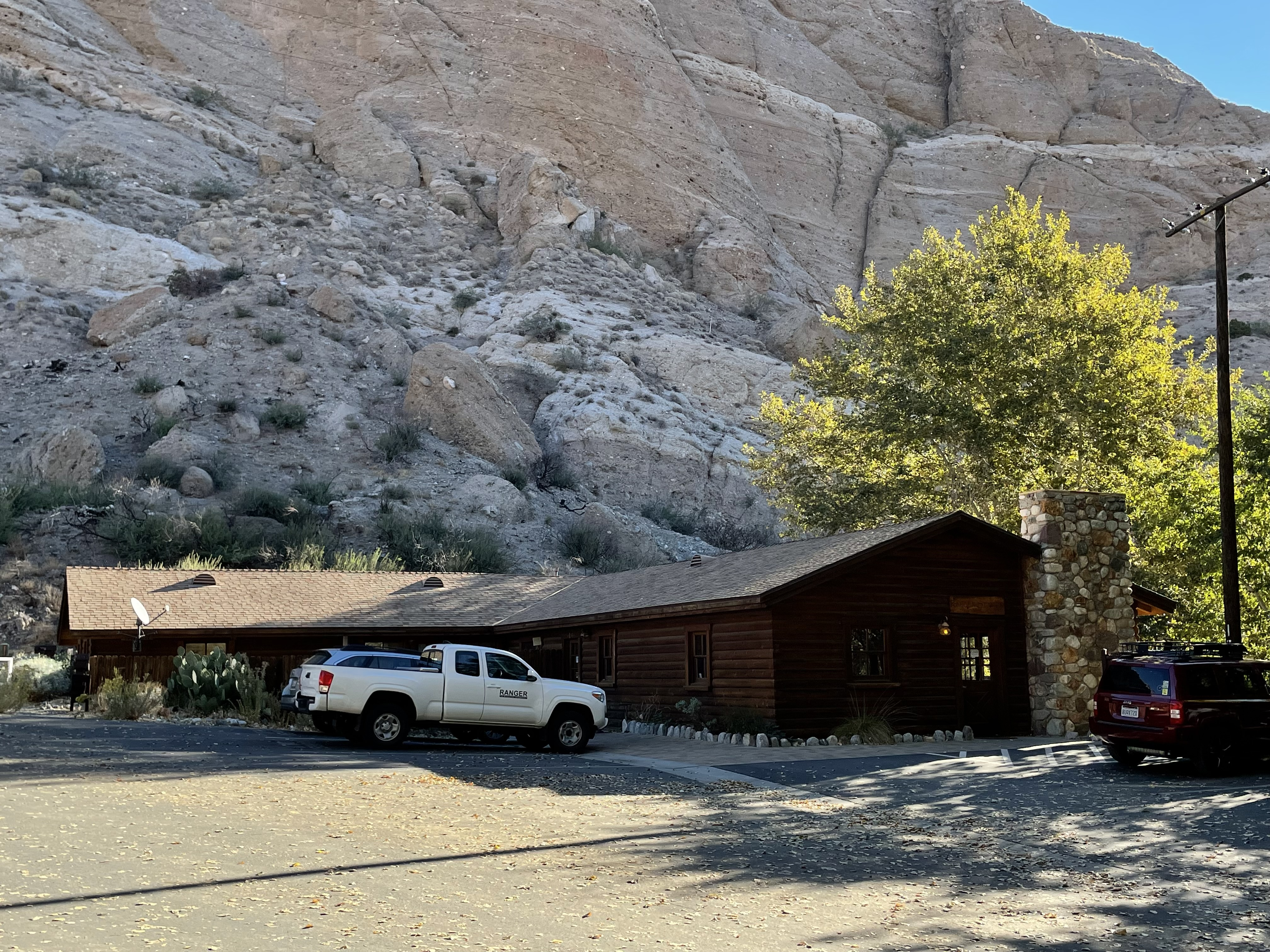
Visitor Center

In the 1930s, a trout farm and lodge operated on private property at this location. Kathryn Mackenzie acquired the site in the 1940s, expanded its facilities with plans for a health retreat, and used cottages from the 1932 Olympics. After her death in 1988, the property operated as the Whitewater Trout Hatchery until 2006.

In 2006, Friends of the Desert Mountains purchased the trout farm with state bond funds through the Coachella Valley Mountains Conservancy and transferred it to The Wildlands Conservancy for permanent management. Initial restoration included planting native sycamores and cottonwoods, removing old structures, and creating hiking trails.

In 2016, President Obama established the Sand to Snow National Monument, with Whitewater Preserve described in the proclamation as one of its main public gateways.

The preserve has experienced several major natural events:

- 2019 – A February storm washed out sections of Whitewater Canyon Road and trails, causing the preserve’s longest closure to date; it reopened in November 2019 after $1.5 million in repairs.
- 2020 – The Water Fire burned 52 acres, damaging a bridge and pond walkway but sparing major facilities. Restoration efforts followed.
- 2023 – Tropical Storm Hilary damaged Whitewater Canyon Road and trails, with long sections of road washed out. The preserve reopened on December 11, 2023, after repairs; at the time of reopening, the Canyon View Loop Trail and the adjoining Pacific Crest Trail segment remained severely damaged.

== Conservation ==
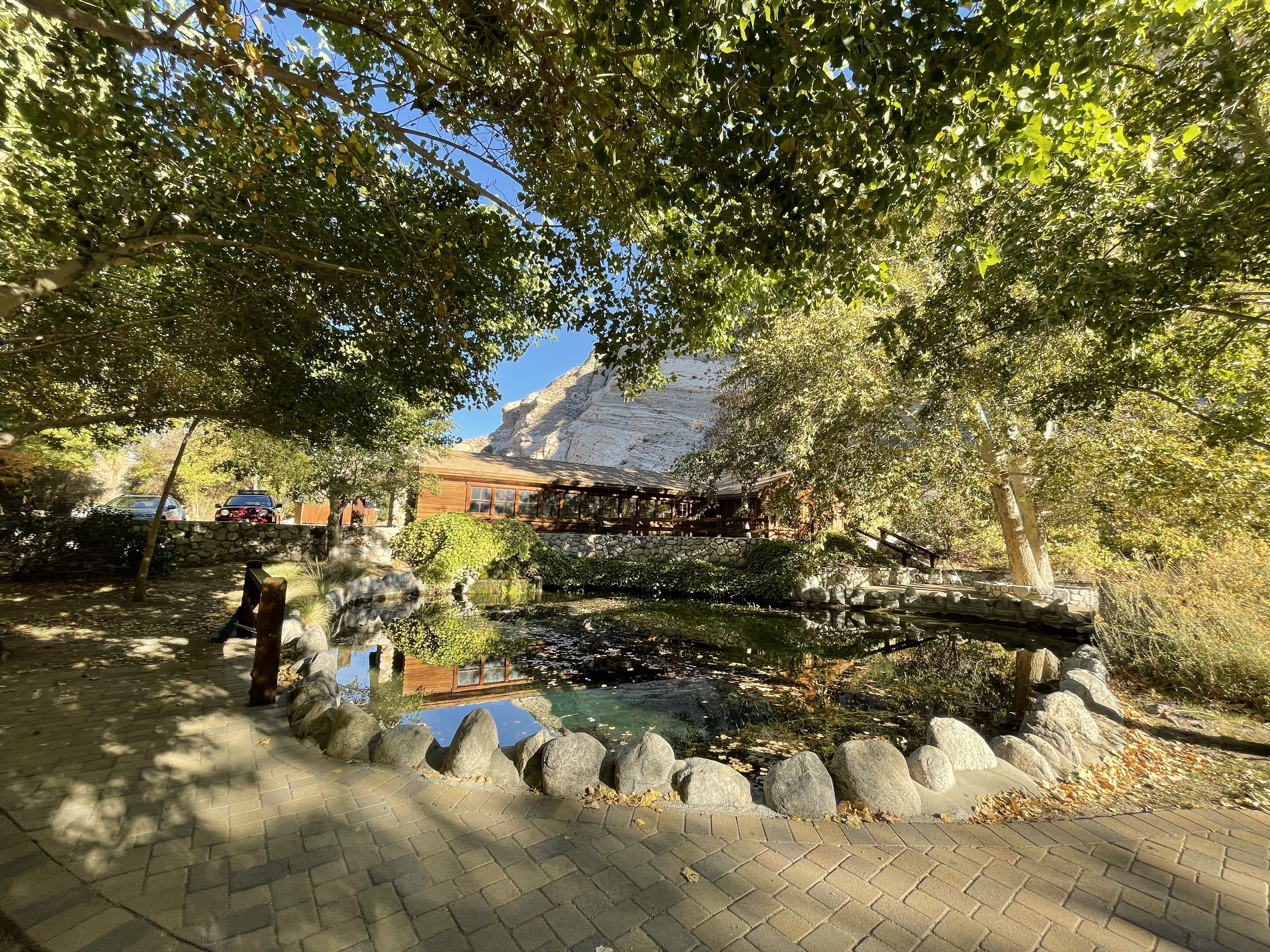
Restored Pond

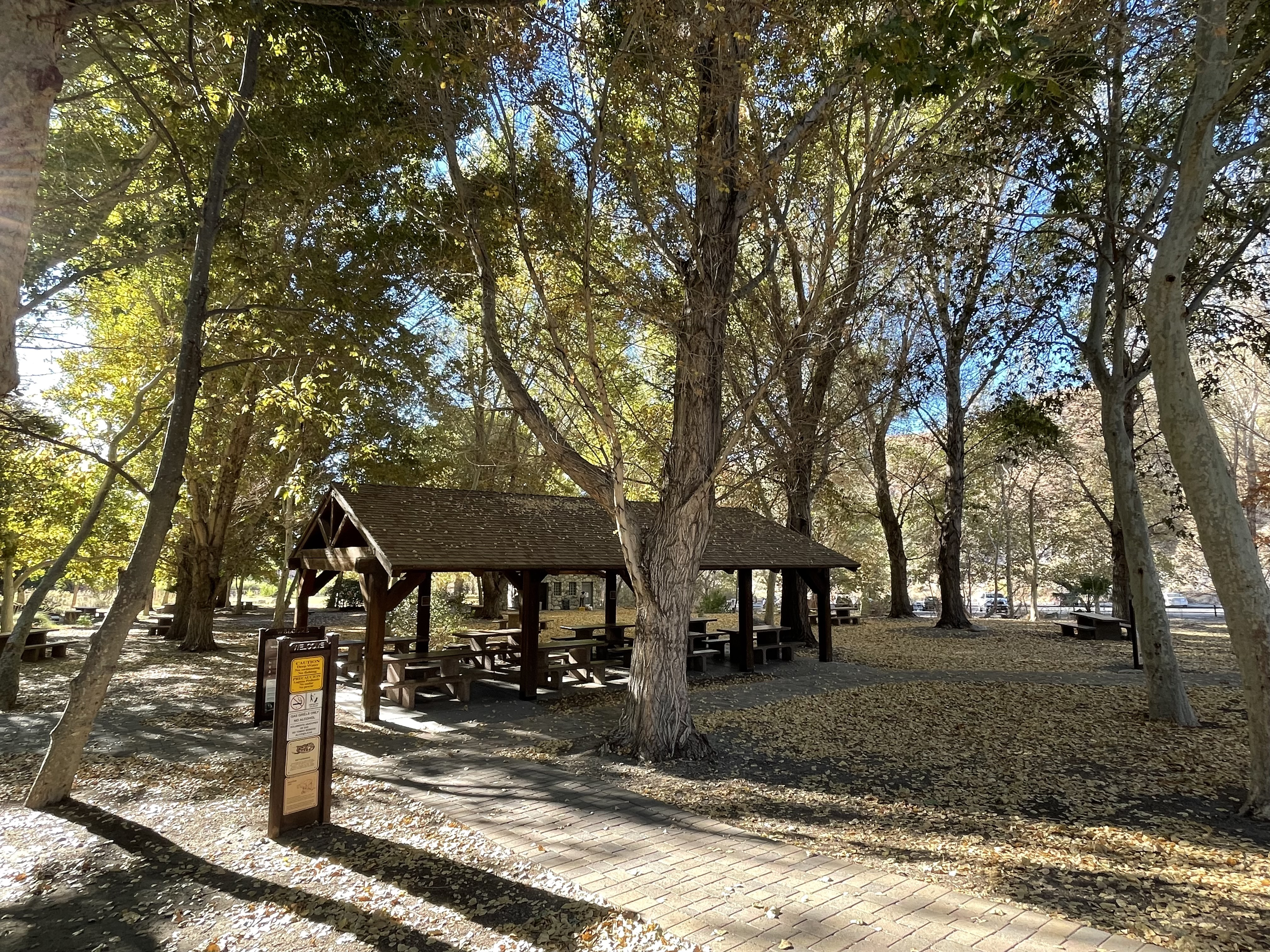
Ramada under restored cottonwoods

Restoration projects at the preserve have included removing cattle from the canyon, demolishing 19 structures, and planting sycamores, cottonwoods, flowering ash, alders, and willows. Following the 2020 Water Fire, The Wildlands Conservancy launched a campaign to restore habitat, replanting willows and other native species and revegetating meadows to resist invasive weeds.

Environmental review under the California Environmental Quality Act has also evaluated proposed levee improvements intended to protect preserve facilities from flood damage, while considering impacts to riparian habitat and endangered species.

Beyond the preserve, The Wildlands Conservancy purchased 3,200 acres in the Whitewater corridor that were later donated to the Bureau of Land Management. This included Windy Point, a dune habitat for the endangered fringe-toed lizard.

== Recreation ==
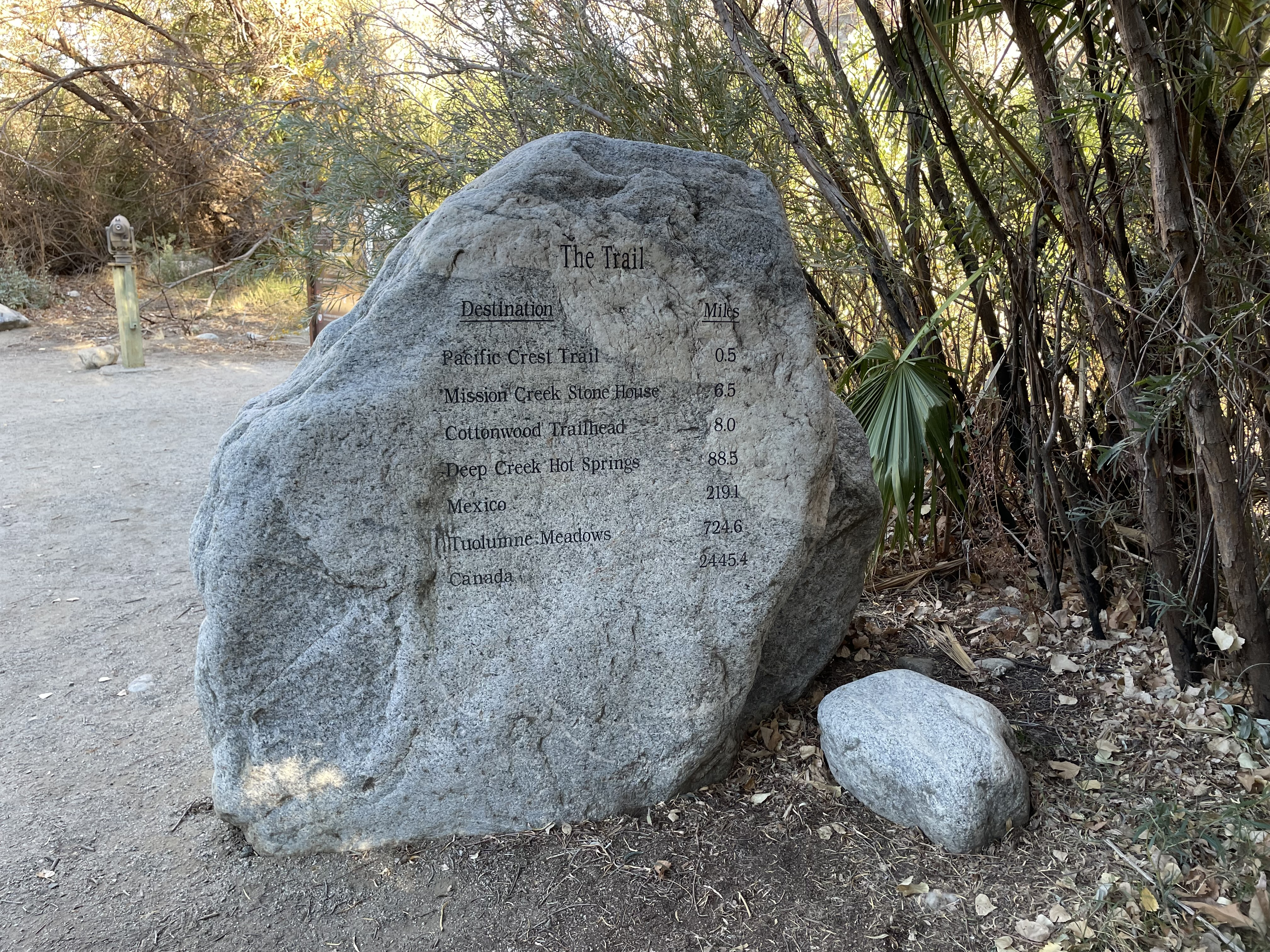
Trailhead marker

Visitor facilities include lawns, ponds, picnic areas, a group campground, restrooms, and paved paths for accessibility. A children’s wading pool and the Ranger Station Visitor Center, housed in the restored trout farm lodge, provide additional amenities.

The preserve maintains the Canyon View Loop, which incorporates part of the Pacific Crest Trail before circling back. By connecting to the PCT, visitors can access much longer routes into the San Gorgonio Wilderness. The preserve is periodically closed during heavy rains because of flood risk in the canyon.

Swimming is prohibited at the preserve, but people often enter the river in summer. Seasonal closures on adjacent BLM lands lead to conflicts over trash, parking, and fire hazards in the canyon.

== Education and programs ==
Whitewater Preserve hosts outdoor interpretive programs on desert water cycles and watershed ecology, designed for elementary through high school students. Programs use short hikes as outdoor classrooms, often introducing local children to desert ecology for the first time.

== Works ==
- "Whitewater Preserve". California's Golden Parks. Episode 167. Chapman University Huell Howser Archive. September 3, 2010.

== See also ==
- List of The Wildlands Conservancy preserves
- Mission Creek Preserve
- Pioneertown Mountains Preserve
- Sand to Snow National Monument
