= Whitewater River (California) =

Stream in California, United States

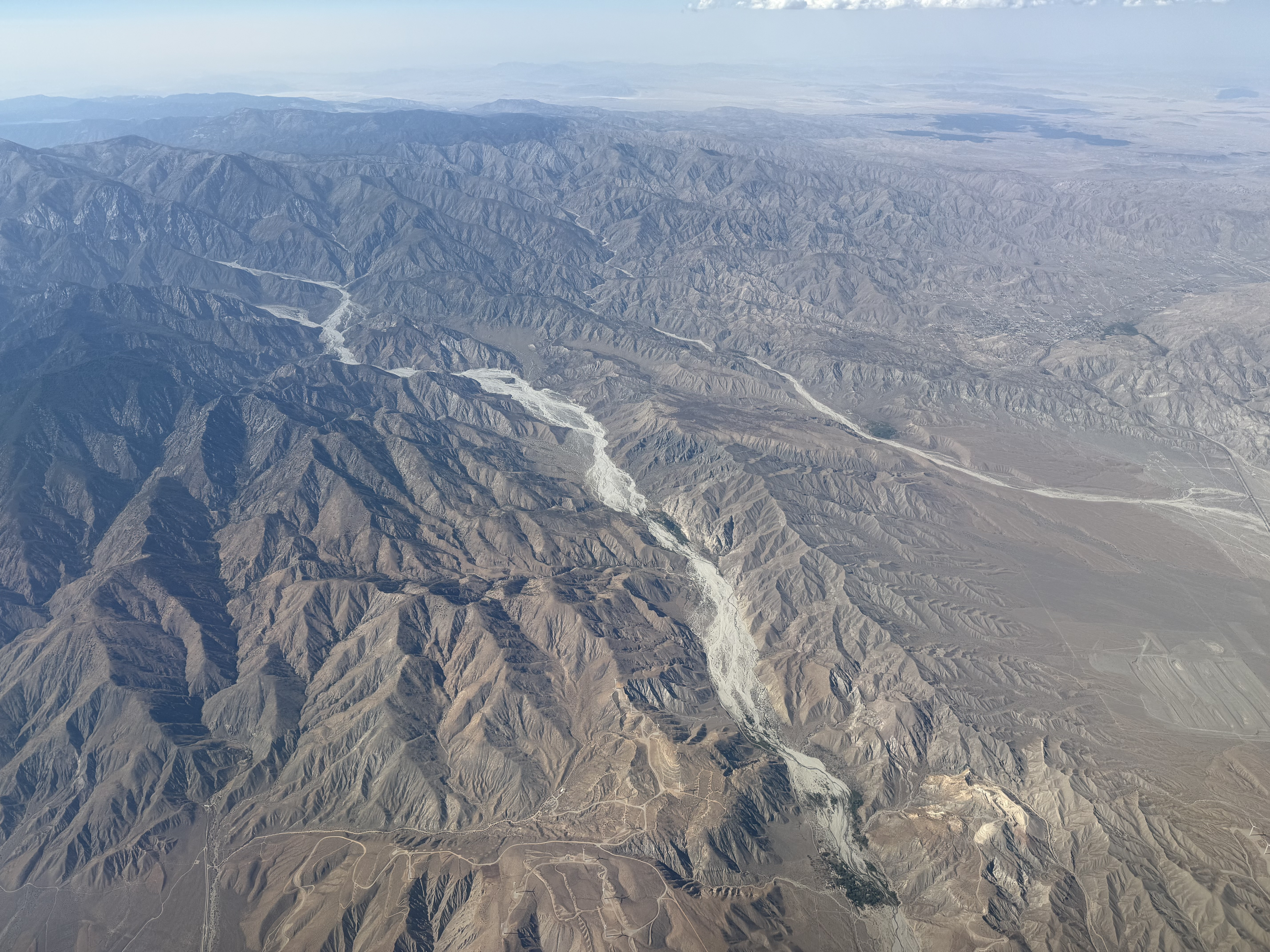
- Aerial view of the river as it flows out of the San Bernardino Mountains

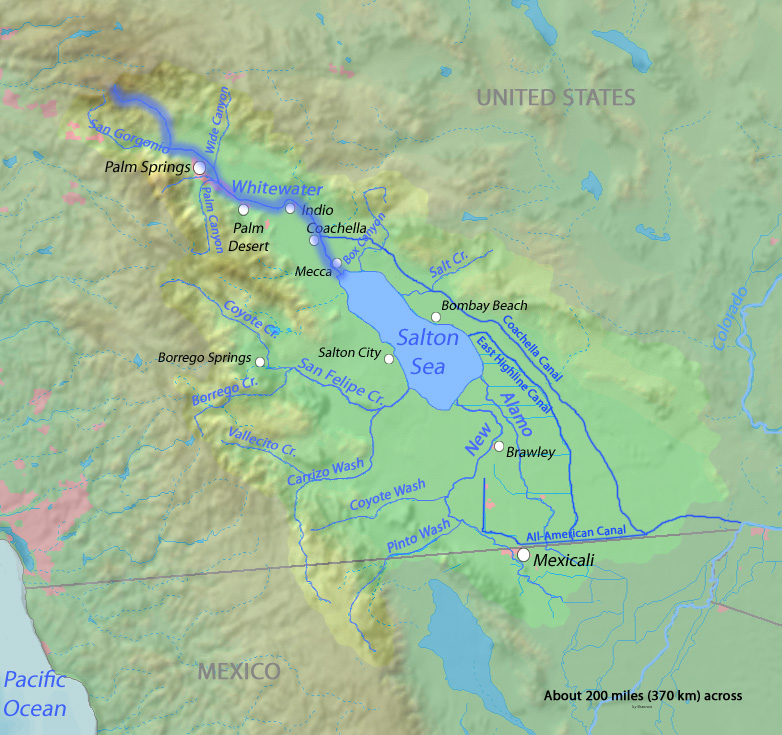
- The course of the Whitewater River highlighted on a map of the Salton Sea drainage basin

Location
- Country: United States
- State: California
- Cities: Palm Springs, Cathedral City, Rancho Mirage, Palm Desert, Indio, Coachella, Mecca

Physical characteristics
- Source: Confluence of North and Middle Forks
  - location: Near San Gorgonio Mountain, San Bernardino Mountains, San Bernardino County
  - coordinates: 34°03′48″N 116°44′50″W
  - elevation: 4,787 ft (1,459 m)
- Mouth: Salton Sea
  - location: South of Mecca, Riverside County
  - coordinates: 33°30′30″N 116°03′26″W
  - elevation: −233 ft (−71 m)
- Length: 53.9 mi (86.7 km)
- Basin size: 1,500 sq mi (3,900 km^{2})
- Discharge
  - location: Indio
  - average: 3.53 cu ft/s (0.100 m^{3}/s)
  - minimum: 0 cu ft/s (0 m^{3}/s)
  - maximum: 11,400 cu ft/s (320 m^{3}/s)

Basin features
- Tributaries
  - left: Mission Creek, Garnet Wash, Thousand Palm Canyon Wash
  - right: South Fork Whitewater River, San Gorgonio River, Chino Wash, Palm Canyon Wash, Cathedral Canyon

National Wild and Scenic River
- Type: Wild, Recreational
- Designated: March 12, 2019

The Whitewater River is a small permanent stream in western Riverside County, California, with some upstream tributaries in southwestern San Bernardino County. The river's headwaters are in the San Bernardino Mountains, and it terminates at the Salton Sea in the Colorado Sonoran Desert. The area drained by the Whitewater River is part of the larger endorheic Salton Sea drainage basin.

Initially called Agua Blanco by early Spanish explorers, and later translated into English as white water, the river received its name for its milky appearance created by the silicate and lime sediments it carries. The community of Whitewater was named after the river, and became a key stop on the Bradshaw Trail stagecoach runs.

Sections of the river are federally protected as part of the National Wild and Scenic Rivers System; the river was designated in 2019. From the headwaters downstream to the San Gorgonio Wilderness, 23.5 miles, is classed as wild and administered by the U.S. Forest Service, and from the wilderness boundary downstream to the Sand to Snow National Monument boundary, 4.6 miles, is classed as recreational and administered by the Bureau of Land Management. The river canyon is an important collecting and gathering area for the Wanakik lineage of Cahuilla. It is also home to federally protected species like the southwestern willow flycatcher and the arroyo toad

== Geography ==
=== San Bernardino Mountains ===
The Whitewater River has three significant tributaries: the North, Middle, and South Forks, all within the Sand to Snow National Monument.

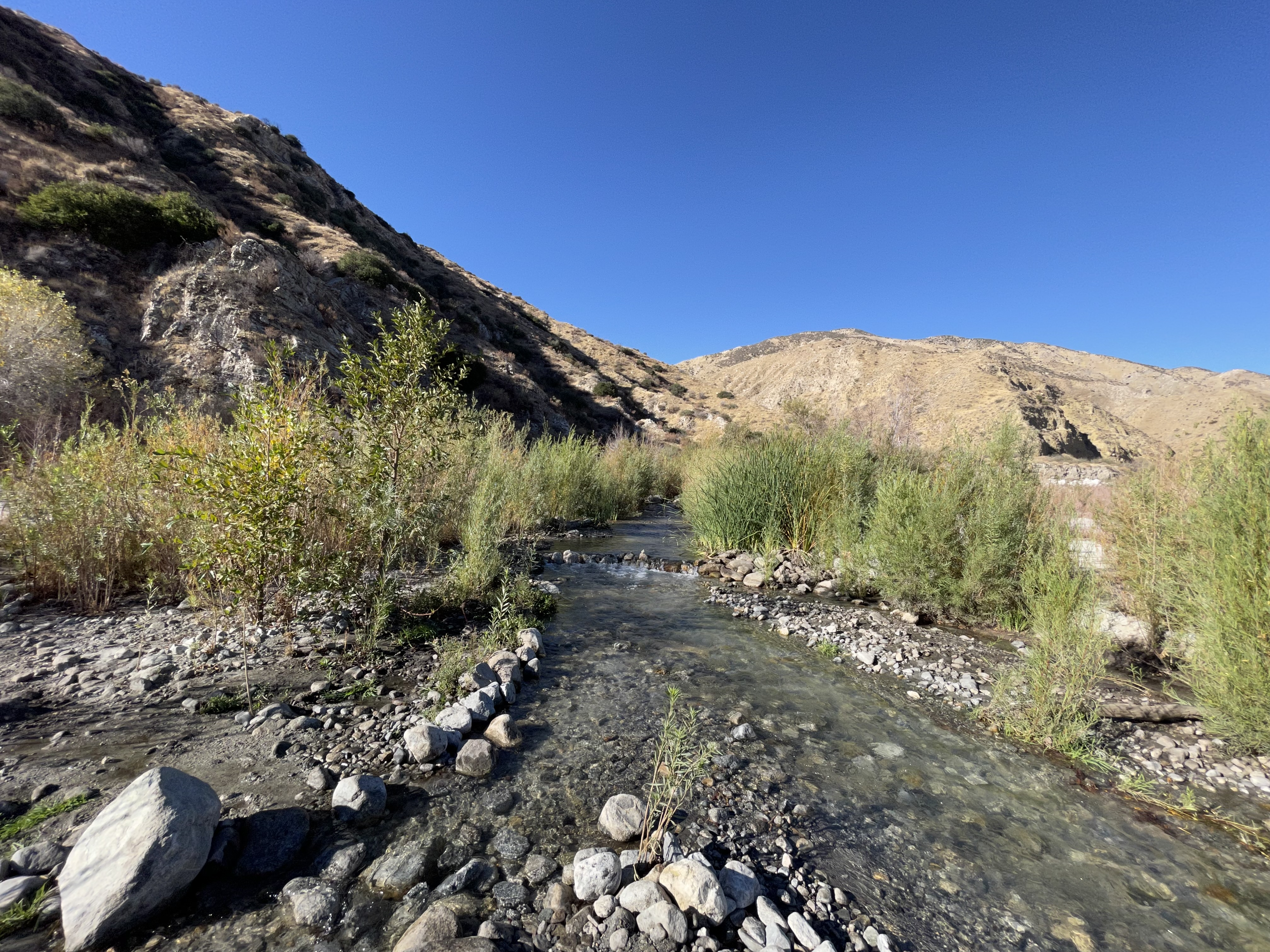
Whitewater River in the upper canyon of the San Bernardino Mountains

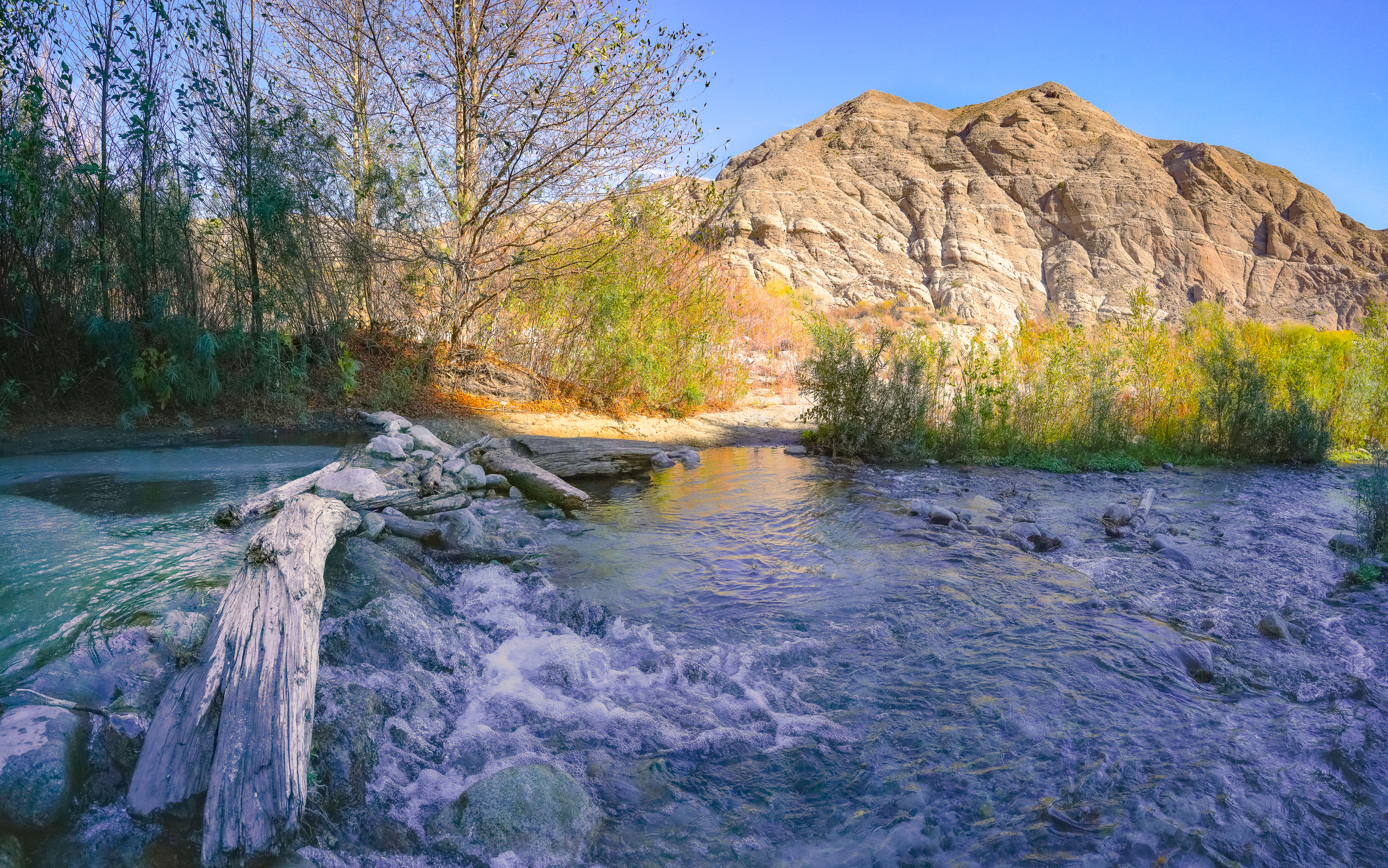
Riparian corridor and canyon walls along the Whitewater River in Whitewater Canyon

The North Fork begins in the subalpine zone at about 10,000 ft (3,000 m) on San Gorgonio Mountain and descends steeply southeast to the Middle Fork, which flows east through a wide arroyo. The South Fork flows northeast through a narrower wooded canyon, joining the Middle Fork lower down. The upper watershed is in the San Gorgonio Wilderness and San Bernardino National Forest, then it reaches land managed by the Bureau of Land Management. Below the confluences, the arroyo is at least 0.5 mi (0.80 km) wide, paved with accumulations of boulders, gravel, and sand brought down by floods and brushy except in stream channels cleared by floodwaters. Due to floods and shifting channels, there is almost no riparian forest development, except locally along unnamed minor tributaries with relatively stable channels.

The Pacific Crest Trail (PCT) enters the arroyo from the north and follows it downstream through Whitewater Canyon. A connecting trail links the PCT to the Whitewater Preserve, which serves as one of the primary public access points to this section of the river. A small population of wild but non-native Rainbow trout occurs locally in shaded reaches or cooler tributaries, but elevated summer temperatures limit their distribution along most of the stream.

Floods and debris flows periodically reshape the Whitewater Canyon section of the river. During the Valentine's Day storm of February 2019 and again during Hurricane Hilary in August 2023, flooding damaged sections of Whitewater Canyon Road and affected access and trails in the canyon.

In contrast to the dry washes commonly visible in the Coachella Valley, the Whitewater River often flows above ground in the upper canyon of the San Bernardino Mountains, where it supports informal recreation such as hiking, wading, and wildlife viewing.

=== Coachella Valley ===
Below the PCT trailhead, the enclosing hills fall away, so the arroyo exits from the San Bernardino Mountains near Morongo Valley into the western Coachella Valley. The San Gorgonio River rises further west on the south side of San Gorgonio Mountain and then joins it. Garnet Wash, Mission Creek, Chino Canyon Wash, Palm Canyon Wash, Cathedral Canyon, and Thousand Palm Canyon Wash also join, but the water mainly penetrates through the porous desert floor, providing groundwater recharging of the Coachella Valley aquifer.

Before approaching Palm Springs, the Whitewater River is fed imported water from the Colorado River Aqueduct, managed by the Metropolitan Water District of Southern California. During rare floods, surface water may reach the endorheic basin of the Salton Sea, below sea level.

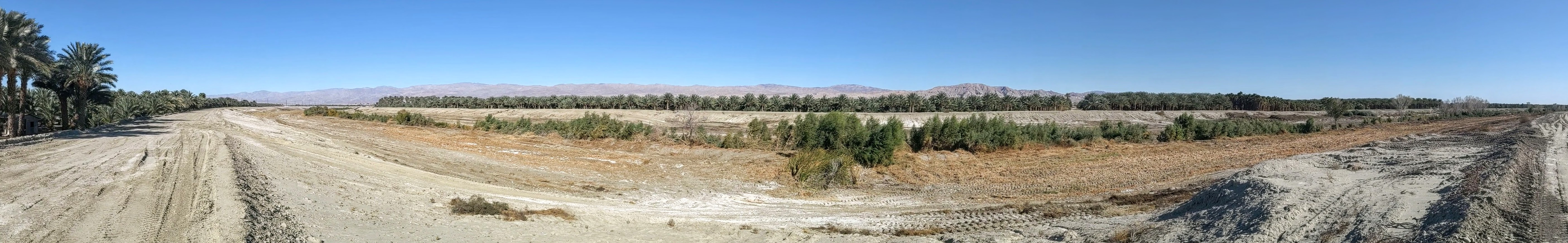
Panoramic view of the dry Whitewater River in the Coachella Valley, between Palm Springs and the Salton Sea, with date palm orchards visible on the far side

== Popular culture ==
In 2001 Huell Howser Productions, in association with KCET/Los Angeles, featured the river and nearby community in California's Gold.
