= San Gorgonio River =

River in the American state of California

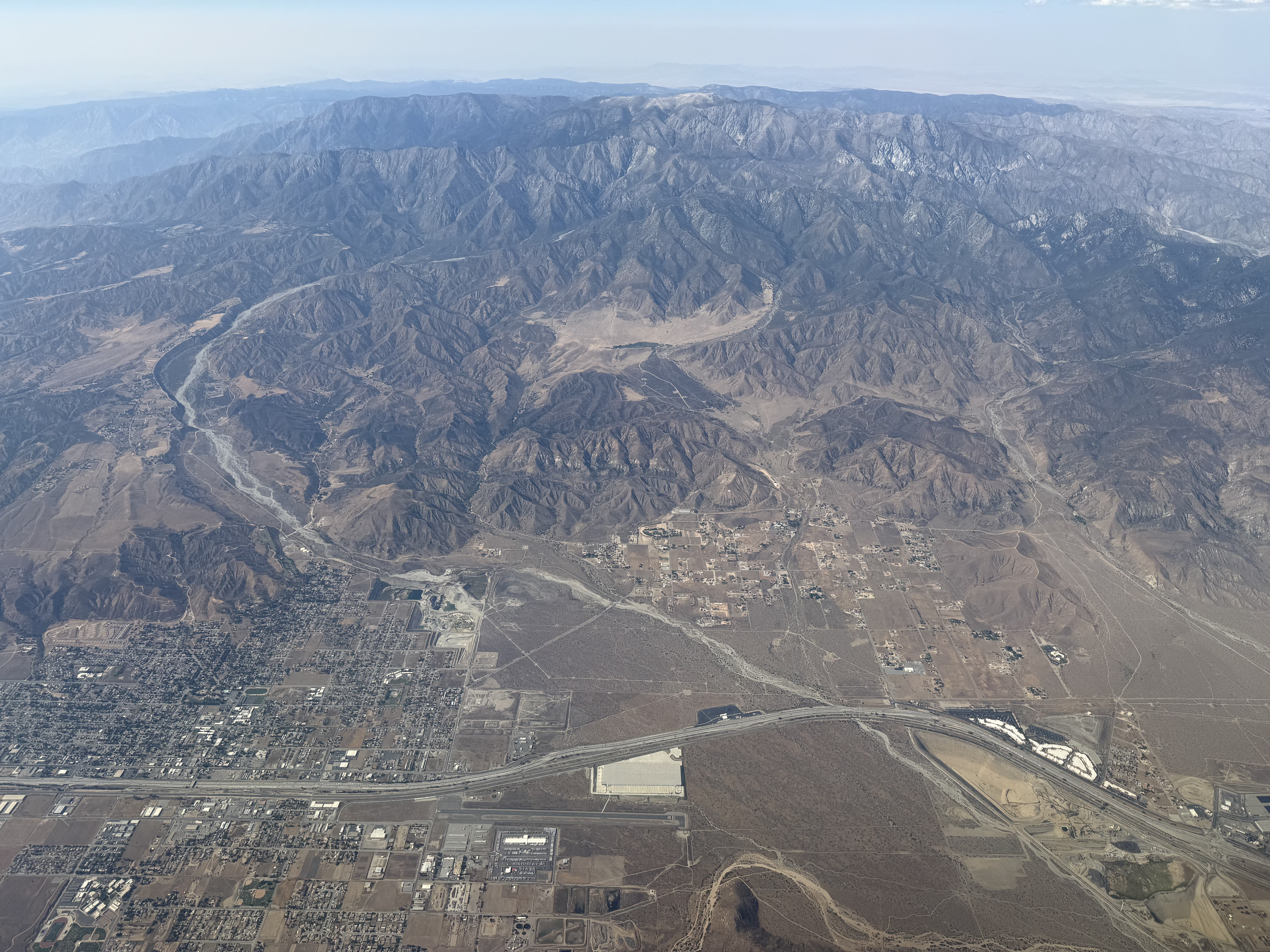
Aerial view of the river departing the San Bernardino Mountains

The San Gorgonio River is a 26.8-mile-long (43.1 km) river primarily flowing in western Riverside County, with a small upstream section in southwestern San Bernardino County, in southern California.

== Geography ==
The river's headwaters arise in the San Bernardino Mountains, southwest of San Gorgonio Mountain at the southern base of Galena Peak within Sand to Snow National Monument. The source is at 34°02′28″N 116°51′06″W and an elevation of approximately 5600 feet at the confluence of Burnt and Sawmill canyons.

The river flows southwest through Banning Canyon then cuts back southeast through the town of Banning, California. It then heads east to its confluence with the Whitewater River in the western Coachella Valley at 33°54′12″N 116°37′41″W and an elevation of 1096 feet. It drains the land east of the San Gorgonio Pass, while the South Fork of the Santa Ana River drains the land west.

The river is intermittent, with significant flow only following winter storms and snowmelt in the spring.
