= Pioneertown Mountains Preserve =

Nature preserve in San Bernardino County, California

- IUCN category V (protected landscape/seascape)
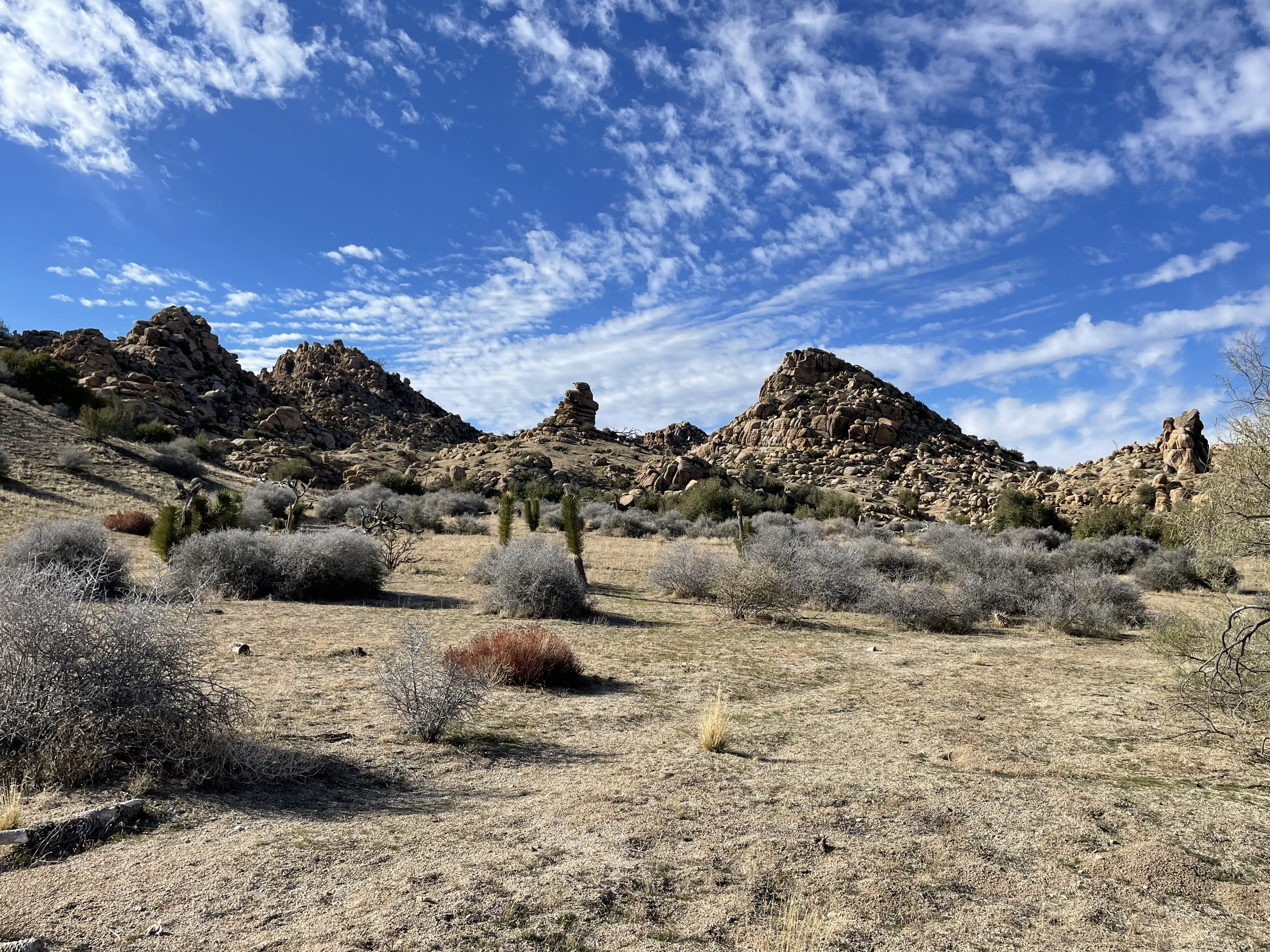
- Sawtooth Landscape

- Location within California
- Interactive map of Pioneertown Mountains Preserve
- Location: San Bernardino County, California
- Nearest city: Pioneertown, California
- Coordinates: 34°10′20″N 116°32′46″W
- Area: 25,500 acres (10,300 ha)
- Max. elevation: 7,750 ft (2,360 m)
- Min. elevation: 3,440 ft (1,050 m)
- Created: 1995
- Operator: The Wildlands Conservancy
- Website: Pioneertown Mountains Preserve

Pioneertown Mountains Preserve is a nature preserve in the Mojave Desert and San Bernardino Mountains that features granite rock formations, volcanic mesas, and riparian canyons that support desert and montane vegetation. The landscape includes the Sawtooth Mountains, Pipes Canyon, and Chaparrosa Peak within the Sand to Snow National Monument region. The 25,500 acres (10,300 ha) property is owned and managed by The Wildlands Conservancy as part of its system of preserves.

== Geography ==
Pioneertown Mountains Preserve covers about 25,500 acres (10,300 ha) in the Little San Bernardino Mountains within the Mojave Desert, near Pioneertown, California. The terrain spans nearly 4,000 feet (1,200 m) of elevation, rising from desert basins to the lower slopes of the San Bernardino Mountains.

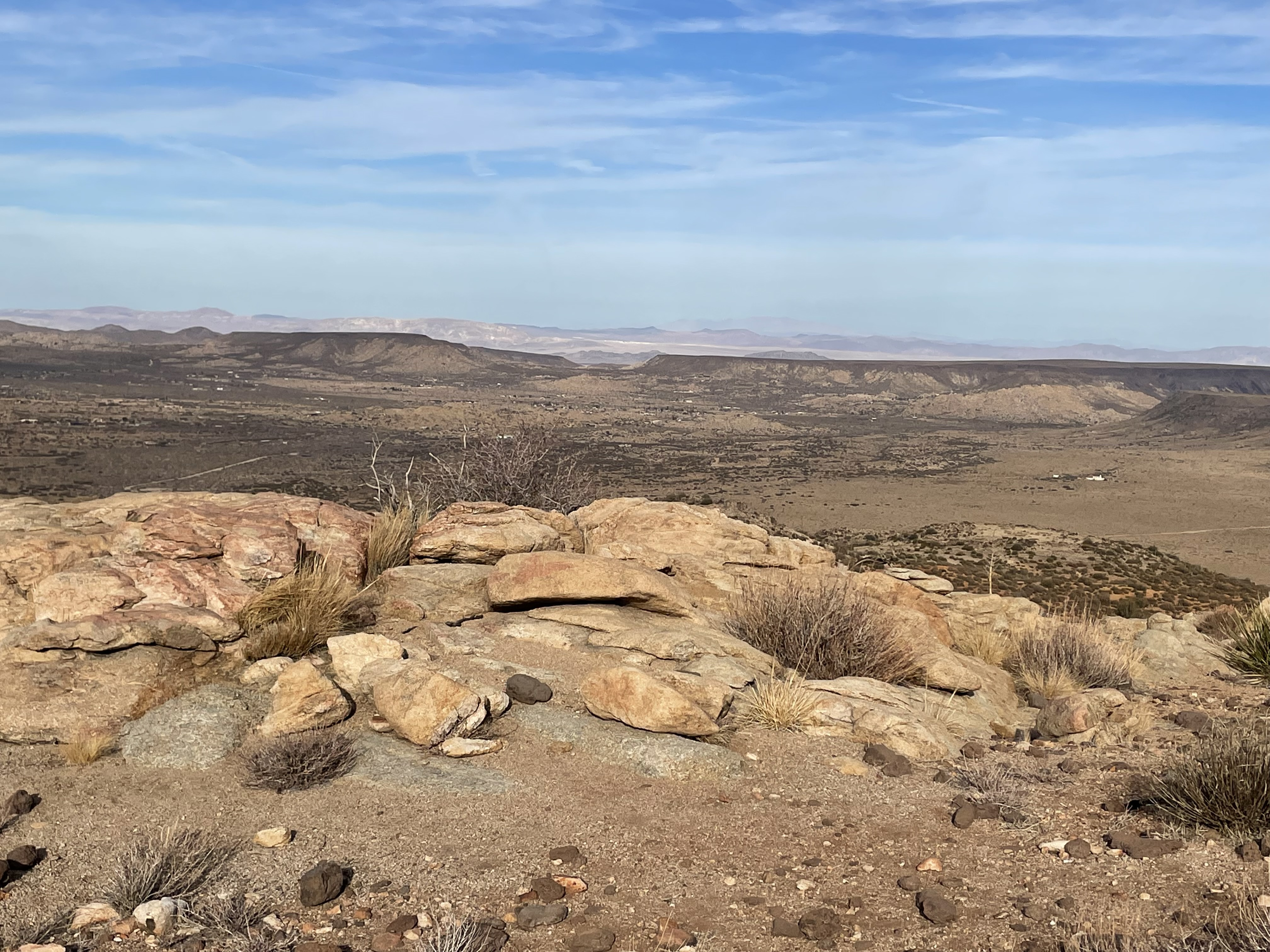
Mesas east of Pioneertown

The landscape is distinguished by rugged canyons, volcanic mesas, and prominent granite formations of the Sawtooth Mountains. Pipes Canyon cuts through sheer red rock walls, while rounded domes and stacked boulder fields characterize the upper terrain. Regionally, the area consists primarily of granitic bedrock of the Little San Bernardino uplift, overlain in places by younger volcanic deposits and sediment aprons shaped by seasonal runoff.

Perennial streams in Pipes Canyon and Little Morongo Canyon support narrow riparian corridors amid otherwise arid terrain. Vegetation transitions from desert scrub and Joshua tree woodland at lower elevations to scattered pinyon and juniper on upper slopes recovering from the Sawtooth Complex Fire of 2006. The preserve spans a transition from Mojave Desert habitats to the lower montane slopes of the San Bernardino Mountains, supporting a diverse mix of desert and upland species and forming part of a regional wildlife linkage identified in the South Coast Missing Linkages plan.

The property adjoins large tracts of Bureau of Land Management land and connects with the Sand to Snow National Monument near the San Gorgonio Wilderness. The preserve and nearby Big Morongo Canyon Preserve occupy the north slope of the Little San Bernardino Mountains, where desert canyons descend toward Morongo Valley.

== Flora and fauna ==
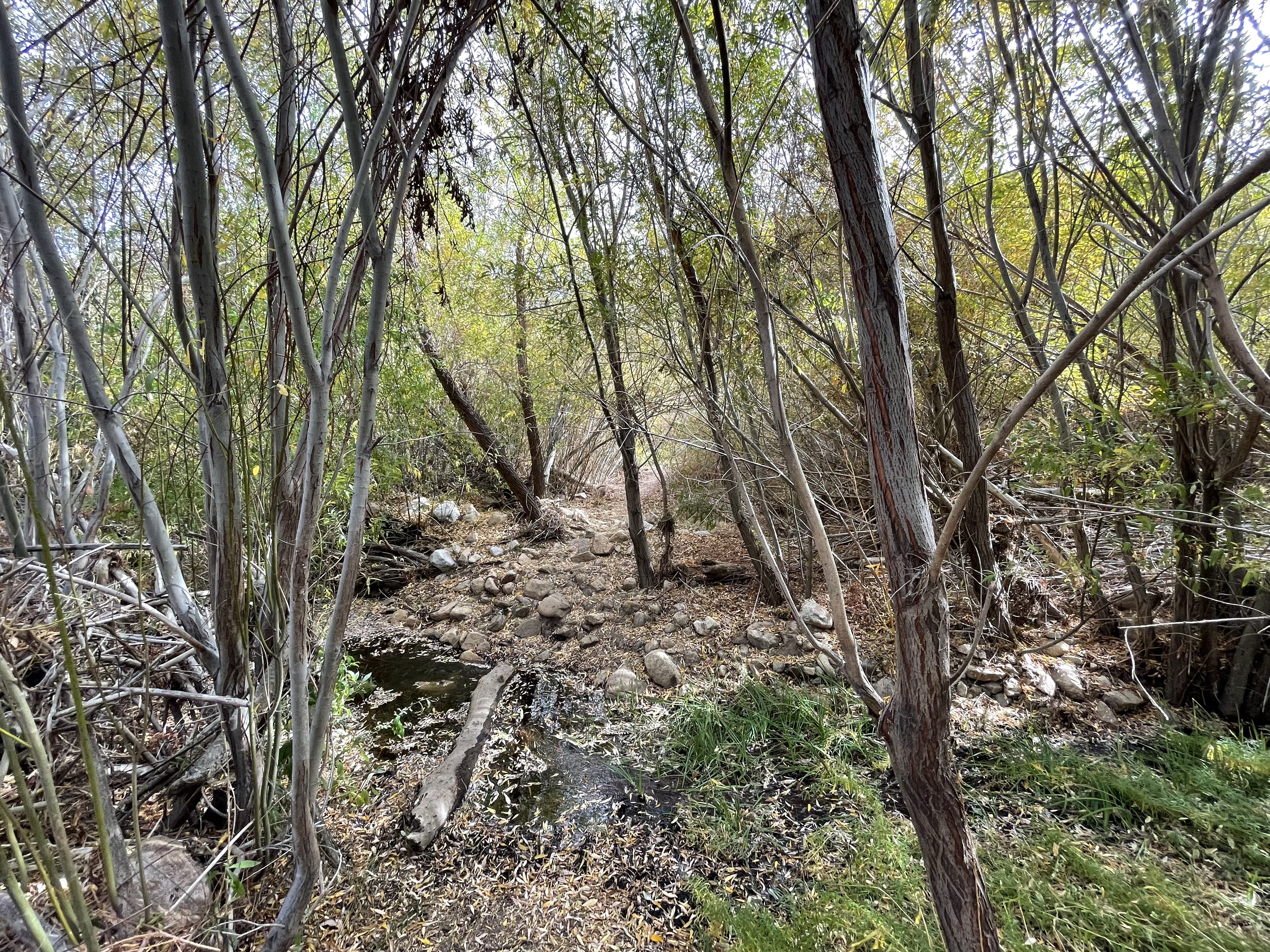
Riparian stream in Pipes Canyon

Vegetation within the preserve reflects its broad elevation range and desert-to-montane setting. Lower elevations support Joshua tree woodland and desert scrub dominated by creosote bush and Mojave yucca, while canyons contain riparian corridors lined with willow and Fremont cottonwood. Higher slopes include scattered pinyon pine and juniper that mark the transition to the lower montane zone of the San Bernardino Mountains. Much of the vegetation community is in long-term recovery from the Sawtooth Complex Fire of 2006, which burned most of the preserve’s plant cover.

The preserve provides habitat for desert bighorn sheep, mule deer, gray foxes, and numerous small mammals and reptiles. Birdlife includes quail, hawks, owls, and migratory songbirds that use the canyon riparian areas as a seasonal corridor. The diversity of habitats—from arid flats and boulder canyons to pinyon-juniper woodland—supports species typical of both the Mojave Desert and the lower slopes of the San Bernardino Mountains.

== History ==
Pioneertown was established in 1946 as a Western film set and resort community. The surrounding lands, including what is now Pioneertown Mountains Preserve, later passed through private ownership and foreclosure.

In the late twentieth century, conservation-minded landowners purchased much of the former ranchland in Pipes Canyon to protect it from development. Their cooperative effort became the foundation of The Wildlands Conservancy, which formally incorporated in 1995. Pipes Canyon became the organization’s first preserve and was later expanded and renamed Pioneertown Mountains Preserve.

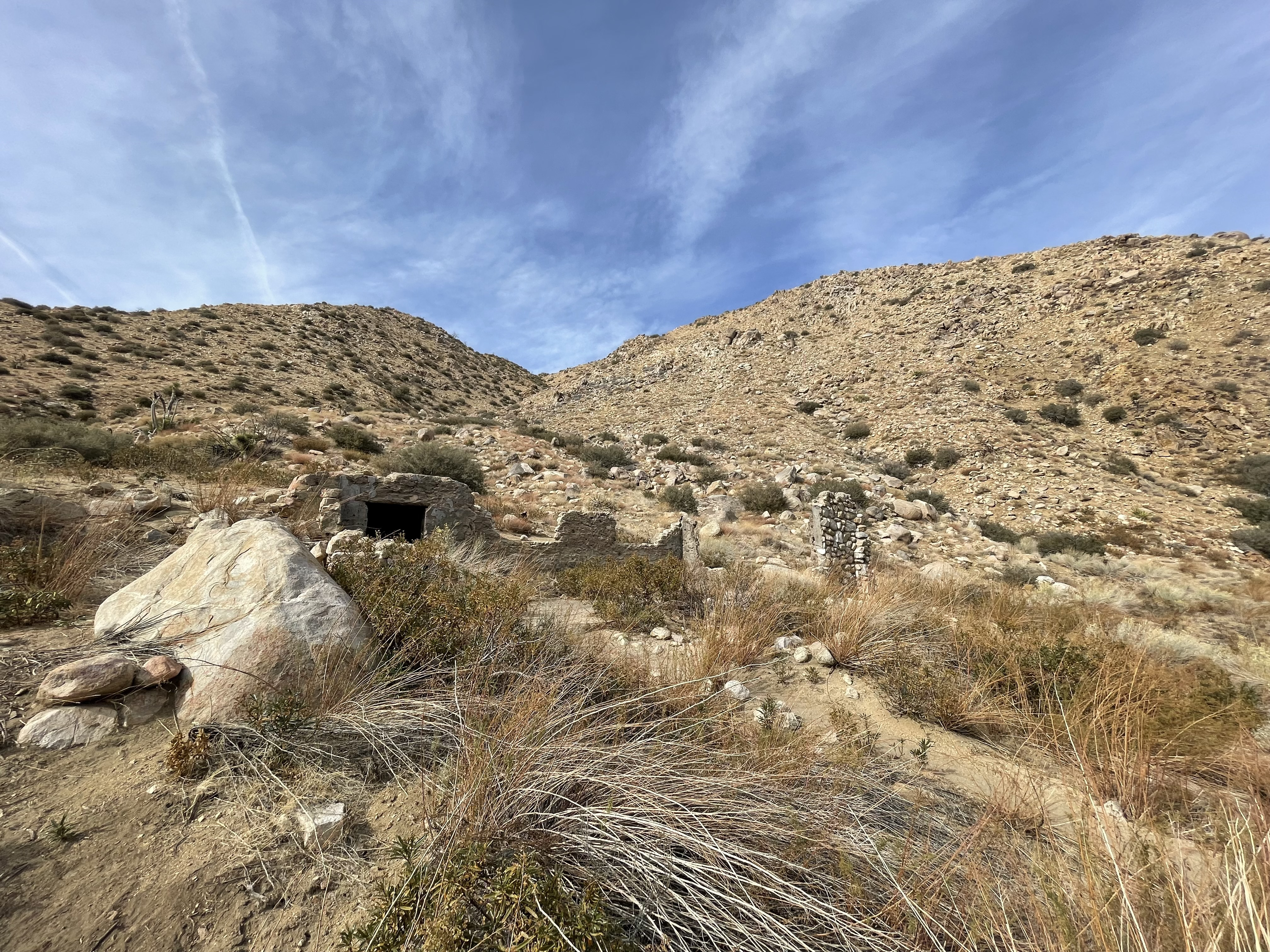
Olsen cabin ruins

A lightning-sparked blaze in July 2006, the Sawtooth Complex Fire, burned most of the preserve’s vegetation and altered its plant communities. Restoration and trail repairs continued for several years. In July 2015, the Lake Fire burned through the preserve’s western section, closing the upper portion of the Pipes Canyon Trail beyond the Olsen Ruins.

In August 2023, flooding from Hurricane Hilary damaged portions of the trail system, closing several routes for an extended period.

== Conservation ==
Pioneertown Mountains Preserve contributes to a network of protected lands that link the Mojave Desert with the San Bernardino Mountains. It lies within a regional wildlife linkage identified in the South Coast Missing Linkages plan, which recognized Pipes Canyon and adjacent drainages as key corridors for species movement between Joshua Tree National Park and the San Gorgonio Wilderness. The preserve is part of a broader group of protected lands in the Sand to Snow region, including nearby Mission Creek Preserve and Whitewater Preserve.

Much of the preserve’s management has focused on ecological recovery from major disturbance events. The 2006 Sawtooth Complex Fire burned most of its vegetation, followed by flooding and erosion that further reshaped canyon habitats, most recently after Hurricane Hilary in 2023. The Wildlands Conservancy has emphasized natural regeneration of native plant communities, control of invasive grasses, and stabilization of damaged slopes. The proposed Green Path North transmission project, which would have crossed through the preserve, was withdrawn in 2010. Restoration funds were sought after a 2020 utility-related disturbance along Pipes Canyon Road. In 2024, a Los Angeles Times feature on Joshua tree conservation identified Pioneertown Mountains Preserve as a site included in climate-refugium restoration efforts for the species.

== Recreation ==
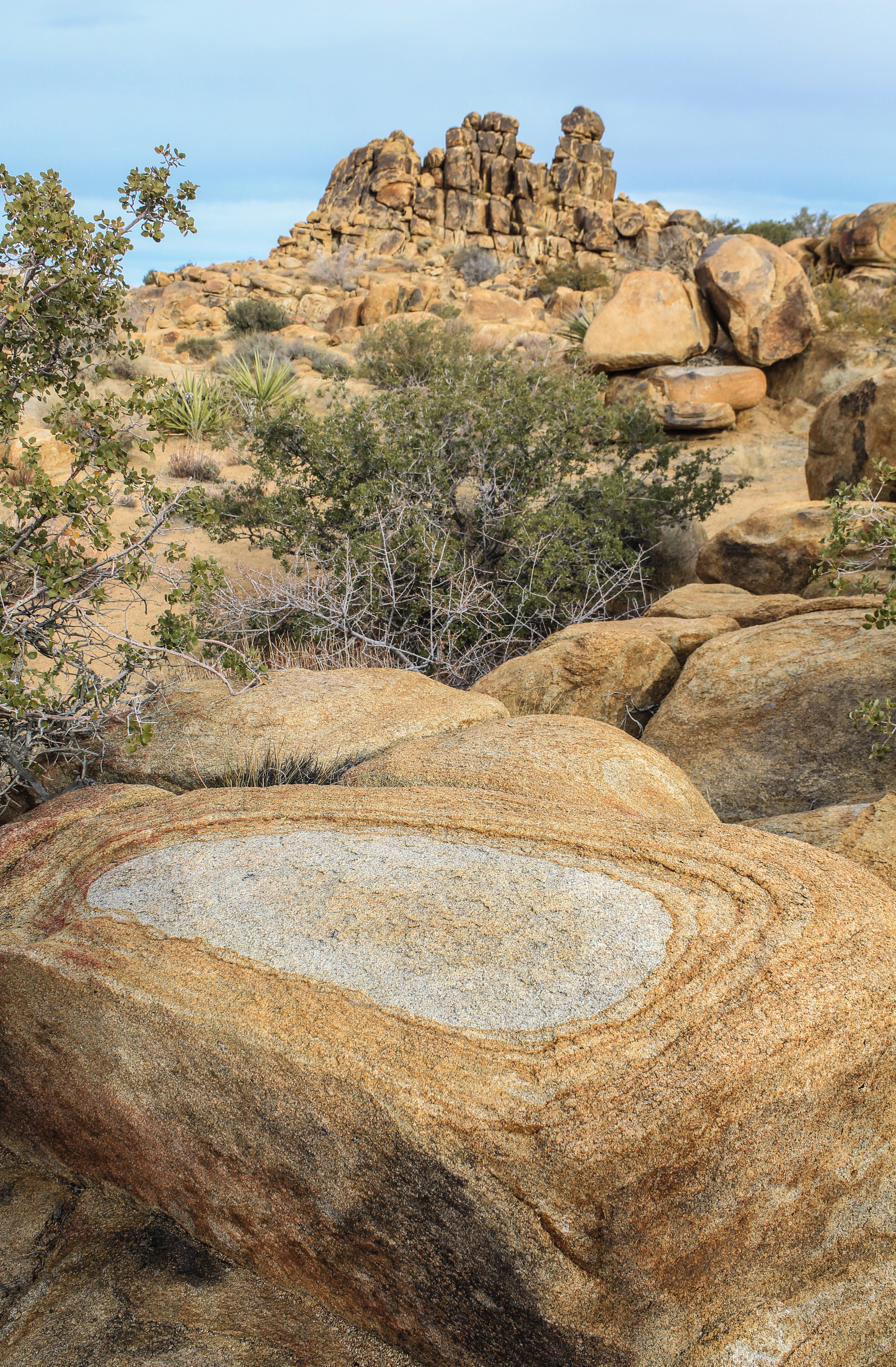
Unique rock formations

The Pipes Canyon Trailhead has parking, a small visitor information center, a covered picnic area, and restrooms. From here, visitors can hike the Indian Loop Trail, which follows the canyon past riparian vegetation and the Olsen Ruins, then climbs steeply to a ridge. A spur trail continues to Chaparrosa Peak, offering wide desert and mountain views.

The Sawtooth Mountains Trailhead provides access to trails that cross boulder fields and granite outcrops characteristic of the preserve’s terrain. Picnic tables and parking are available, and portions of the Sawtooth Loop are open to equestrian use. The route passes through dramatic rock formations reminiscent of nearby Joshua Tree National Park. Educational and volunteer programs are occasionally offered by The Wildlands Conservancy.

== See also ==
- List of The Wildlands Conservancy preserves
- Mission Creek Preserve
- Whitewater Preserve
- Sand to Snow National Monument
- Joshua Tree National Park
