= Sand to Snow National Monument =

National monument in California, United States

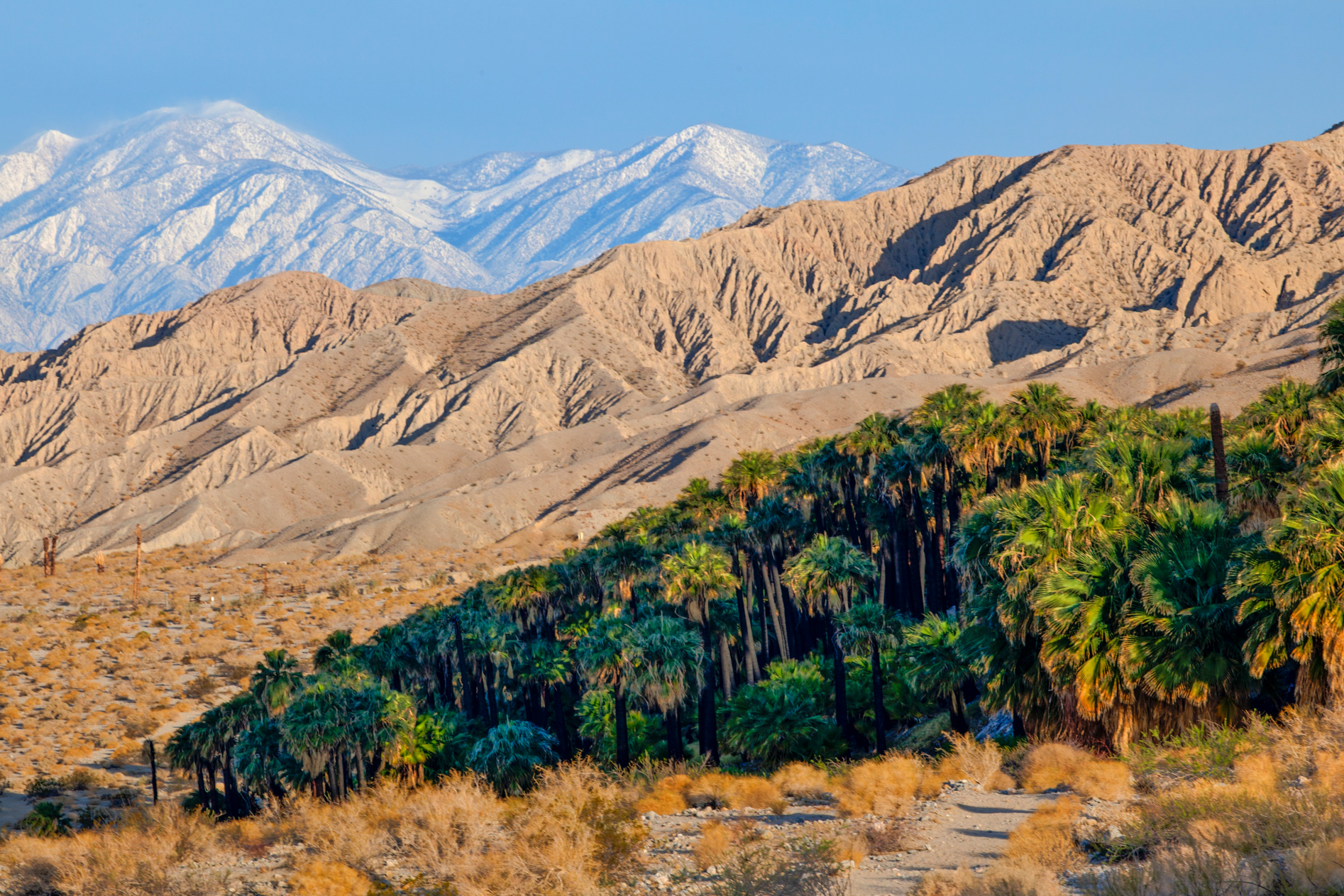

- Location within southern California Location within California Location within the United States
- Interactive map of Sand to Snow National Monument
- Location: San Bernardino County, California, US
- Coordinates: 34°05′N 116°41′W
- Area: 154,000 acres (62,000 ha)
- Authorized: February 12, 2016
- Governing body: Bureau of Land Management, U.S. Forest Service

U.S. National Monument

Sand to Snow National Monument is a National Monument located in southern San Bernardino County and northern Riverside County, Southern California. Established by President Barack Obama in 2016 pursuant to his powers under the Antiquities Act, the monument is jointly managed by two serpate agencies of the federal government, the United States Forest Service (USFS) and the Bureau of Land Management (BLM).

It protects diverse montane and desert habitats of the San Bernardino Mountains, southern Mojave Desert, and northwestern Colorado Desert.

== Geography ==
The national monument protects a total of 154,000 acres (62,000 ha), with the Bureau of Land Management (BLM) managing 83,000 acres (34,000 ha) acres, and the USFS−San Bernardino National Forest managing 71,000 acres (29,000 ha). It extends from around 1,000 feet (300 m) on the Coachella Valley desert floor up to over 11,000 feet (3,400 m) in the San Bernardino Mountains.

Over 100,000 acres (40,000 ha) of the national monument are within the San Gorgonio Wilderness area, which was designated by Congress in 1964. An eastern border in the Little San Bernardino Mountains abuts Joshua Tree National Park. An detached section of the monument, Black Lava Butte, expands the Bighorn Mountain Wilderness area to the northeast.

Thirty miles (48 km) of the Pacific Crest National Scenic Trail pass through the monument. The headwaters of the Santa Ana River, Whitewater River, Morongo Creek, and San Gorgonio River are within it. The park protects a significant wildlife corridor and landscape linkage between the San Bernardino National Forest/San Gorgonio Wilderness area, Joshua Tree National Park, and Bighorn Mountain Wilderness area.

== Ecology ==
Diverse plant communities in the park support flora of the higher Mojave and lower Sonoran Colorado Deserts, chaparral, California oak woodland, coniferous forest, and alpine ecosystems, making it the most botanically rich national monument in the United States.

Plant life native to the San Bernardino Mountains is influenced by their location at the convergence of three distinct ecosystems: California chaparral and woodlands to the west, Mojave Desert to the east, and Sonoran Desert to the south. There are over 1,600 different plant species native to the range.

Sand dunes are home to the endangered fringe-toed lizard at the lower elevation confluence of the Whitewater and San Gorgonio Rivers, while Desert bighorn sheep are found at higher elevations.

== Designation ==
Sand to Snow National Monument was designated by President Obama on February 12, 2016 along with Castle Mountains National Monument and Mojave Trails National Monument. It is governed by the United States Forest Service and the Bureau of Land Management.

The Sand to Snow National Monument was inspired by The Wildlands Conservancy’s twenty-year-old Sand to Snow Wilderness Interface Project that included more than 60,000 acres (24,000 ha) of privately-funded land acquisition, including private properties threatened with development. The Conservancy established Whitewater Preserve, Mission Creek Preserve, and Pioneertown Mountains Preserve. The Big Morongo Canyon Preserve was protected as a wildlife reserve in 1982, and later included in the monument, forming thus its most developed area. The aggregate set of preserved lands extends recreational opportunities in the Coachella Valley region.

== See also ==
- List of national monuments of the United States
- Natural history of the Mojave Desert
- Natural history of the Colorado Desert
- San Bernardino Mountains topics
- Big Morongo Canyon Preserve
