= Bighorn Mountains Wilderness =

Wilderness area in southern California

Bighorn Mountain Wilderness
- IUCN category Ib (wilderness area)
- Location within the United States
- Location: San Bernardino County, California, United States
- Coordinates: 34.306325°N 116.6320472°W
- Area: 38,342 acres (155 km^{2})
- Established: 1994
- Governing body: U.S. Department of Interior Bureau of Land Management

The Bighorn Mountain Wilderness is a wilderness area which is situated in the eastern foothills of the San Bernardino Mountains. The area of the wilderness spans about 38,342 acres. It is known for the unique nuts and plants inside of the site.

It was created as a result of the California Desert Protection Act of 1994, however, it was first settled by the Serrano tribe as a place to gather plants and other resources. Today, the site is still used by the descendants of the Serrano tribe to continue the tradition of gathering food and other resources which the site has within its territory.
