= San Gorgonio Mountain =

Highest peak of the Transverse Ranges of California, United States

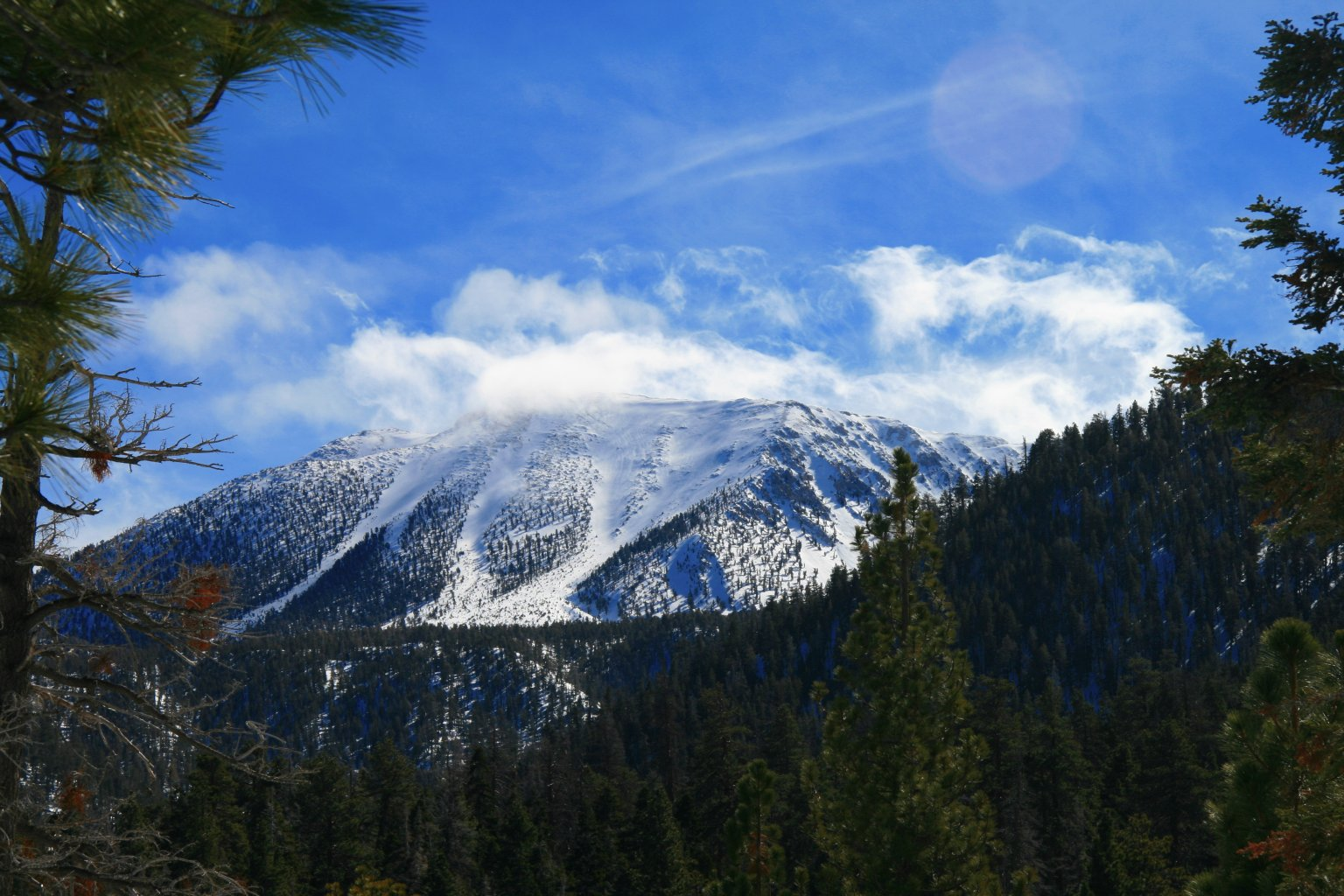
- San Gorgonio summit seen from the northeast

Highest point
- Elevation: 11,503 ft (3,506 m) NAVD 88
- Prominence: 8,294 ft (2,528 m) ↓ Soledad Pass
- Isolation: 162.49 mi (261.50 km) → Charleston Peak
- Listing: North American prominent peaks 33rd; North American isolated peaks 76th; California county high points 9th; Three Saints; Hundred Peaks Section
- Coordinates: 34°05′57″N 116°49′29″W

Naming
- English translation: Saint Gorgonius
- Language of name: Spanish

Geography
- Location within southern California Location within California Location within the United States
- Location: San Bernardino County, California, U.S.
- Parent range: San Bernardino Mountains
- Topo map: USGS San Gorgonio Mountain

Climbing
- First ascent: 1872 by W. A. Goodyear and Mark Thomas
- Easiest route: Strenuous hike

San Gorgonio Mountain, also known locally as Mount San Gorgonio, or Old Greyback, San Gor and San G is a 11,503-foot (3,506 m) mountain in the San Bernardino Mountains of the US state of California. The highest peak in Southern California and the Transverse Ranges, it lies 27 miles (43 km) east of the city of San Bernardino and 12 miles (19 km) north-northeast of San Gorgonio Pass. It lies within the San Gorgonio Wilderness, part of the Sand to Snow National Monument managed by the San Bernardino National Forest.

Spanish missionaries in the area during the early 17th century named the peak after Saint Gorgonius.

Since it is the highest point in a region which is separated from higher peaks (e.g. in the Sierra Nevada) by relatively low terrain, San Gorgonio Mountain is one of the most topographically prominent peaks in the United States. It is ranked 7th among peaks in the 48 contiguous states and 18th overall.

Like other high peaks in the Transverse Ranges, the mountain has a pyramid shape, with a steep north face and a slightly shallower south face. The mountain is large and broad; the summit plateau itself is one square-mile in area (2.6 km^{2}).

In contrast to its spectacular but lower neighbor, San Jacinto Peak, San Gorgonio is not particularly craggy, and from a distance, it appears to be an exceptionally tall hill, earning it the name of greyback. Despite not being particularly striking in appearance during the summer, it is the only mountain in Southern California with a summit a significant distance above the tree line. As such its bright white winter snow cap, unobstructed by vegetation, makes the mountain noticeable from many miles away. The mountain hosts the longest recorded line of sight in the contiguous United States; it is plainly visible from the summit of Mount Whitney, 190 miles (306 km) away. It is also possible on clear days to see the skyline of Los Angeles from the peak, 82 miles (132 km) away.

== Geography ==
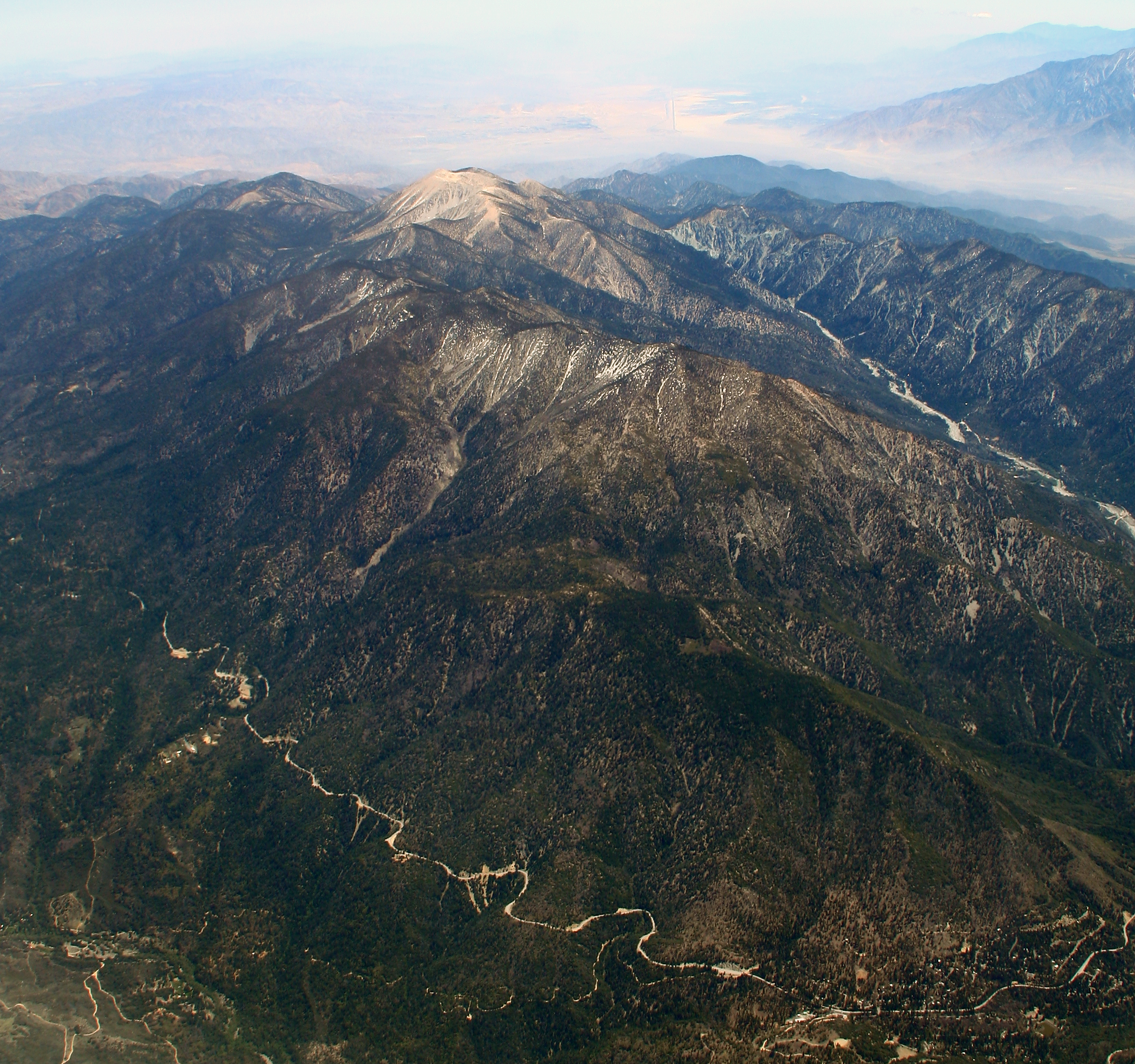
The shallow slopes of San Gorgonio Mountain earn it the name of Old Greyback

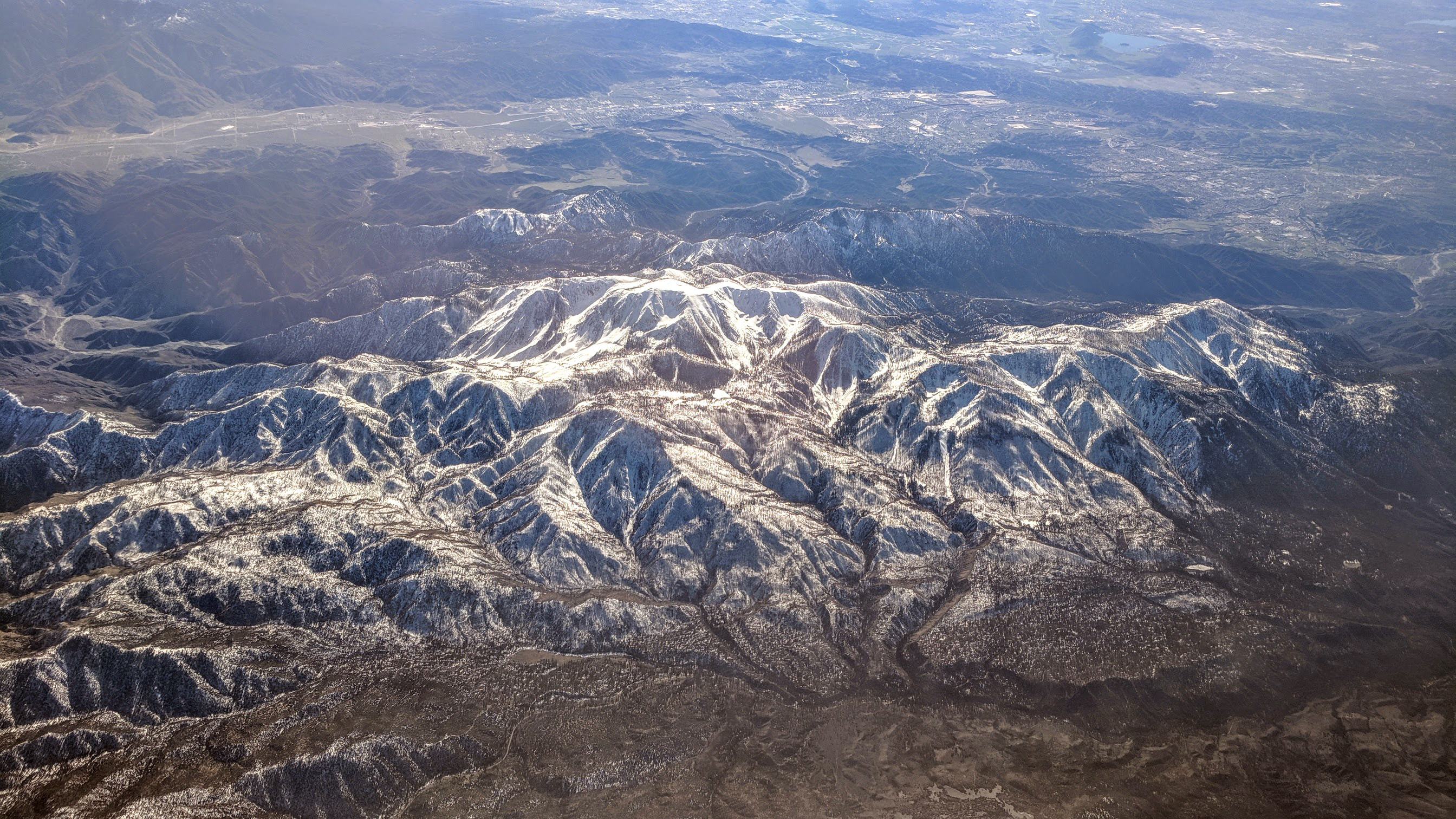
Mount San Gorgonio with snow, with the Banning Pass and Banning, California, in the background

San Gorgonio Mountain lies at the easternmost extremity of the Transverse Ranges. The mountain is a heavily eroded, partially dissected plateau.

Big Bear Lake, California is the largest city near San Gorgonio, and hosts two major ski resorts; it is also used for summer recreation.

=== Geology ===
The shape of the mountain is influenced by a series of steeply dipping thrust faults on the north face of the mountain. The south side of the mountain contains river canyons typical of a dissected plateau.

The mountain consists of a massive block of quartz monzonite, which sits on an ancient platform of Precambrian gneissic rocks. Glacial and fluvial deposits dominate the surface of the lowest part of the mountain.

=== Hydrology ===
Three major Southern California rivers have their source on San Gorgonio Mountain: the Santa Ana River, the Whitewater River, and the San Gorgonio River.

Jenks Lake, on the north slope of the mountain, is one of the few perennial lakes in Southern California.

San Gorgonio Mountain sits on the Great Basin Divide, which separates streams that flow into the basins of the Basin and Range Province from rivers that flow into the Pacific Ocean.

=== Climate ===
The climate on most of the mountain is Csb (Warm-summer Mediterranean) under the Köppen climate classification. The summit of San Gorgonio has a dry summer subalpine climate (Köppen Dsc), bordering on Alpine climate (ET), with only two months averaging over 10 °C.

Climate data for San Gorgonio Mountain 34.1009 N, 116.8240 W, Elevation: 11,132 ft (3,393 m) (1991–2020 normals)
Month	Jan	Feb	Mar	Apr	May	Jun	Jul	Aug	Sep	Oct	Nov	Dec	Year
Mean daily maximum °F (°C)	36.5 (2.5)	35.6 (2.0)	38.7 (3.7)	42.7 (5.9)	50.5 (10.3)	60.5 (15.8)	65.5 (18.6)	64.6 (18.1)	59.9 (15.5)	51.5 (10.8)	43.0 (6.1)	36.9 (2.7)	48.8 (9.3)
Daily mean °F (°C)	26.8 (−2.9)	25.5 (−3.6)	27.9 (−2.3)	31.7 (−0.2)	37.3 (2.9)	46.3 (7.9)	51.5 (10.8)	50.8 (10.4)	48.0 (8.9)	40.3 (4.6)	33.0 (0.6)	27.0 (−2.8)	37.2 (2.9)
Mean daily minimum °F (°C)	17.1 (−8.3)	15.3 (−9.3)	17.2 (−8.2)	20.7 (−6.3)	24.2 (−4.3)	32.1 (0.1)	37.5 (3.1)	37.0 (2.8)	36.2 (2.3)	29.1 (−1.6)	23.0 (−5.0)	17.2 (−8.2)	25.6 (−3.6)
Average precipitation inches (mm)	11.93 (303)	11.64 (296)	7.81 (198)	3.49 (89)	1.06 (27)	0.23 (5.8)	0.43 (11)	0.49 (12)	1.54 (39)	3.72 (94)	4.13 (105)	7.08 (180)	53.55 (1,359.8)
Source: PRISM Climate Group

== Hiking ==
Like most other peaks in the Transverse Ranges, the summit is a technically easy "class 1" hike. Several trails lead to the broad summit of San Gorgonio Mountain, which rises a few hundred feet (100 m) above the tree line. Most routes are very strenuous and require well over 4,000 feet (1,200 m) of elevation gain.

The trail leading from the Fish Creek Trailhead to San Gorgonio Mountain has about 3,400 feet (1,000 m) of gain, less than the routes from the South Fork and Vivian Creek trailheads. Some junctions on this trail are not well marked.

== Aircraft wreckages ==
On December 1, 1952, a Douglas C-47, serial number 45-1124, crashed at the 11,000 feet (3,400 m) level on the eastern face of the mountain. The C-47 was en route from Offutt Air Force Base, Nebraska, to March Air Force Base near Riverside, California, when it struck the mountain at night in the middle of a storm. "The aircraft was last heard from at 9:51 p.m. Pacific Standard Time, Monday." Thirteen people died.

Nearly one month after the C-47 accident a Marine Corps HRS-2 helicopter, bureau number 129037, crashed on the mountain in coordination of the efforts of recovering the victims. The three crewmen of the helicopter survived the impact. The remains of the wreckage of the two aircraft were left on the mountain and are accessible via the Fish Creek Trailhead or the South Fork Trailhead.

On January 6, 1977, Learjet 24 N12MK on a chartered flight from Palm Springs to Las Vegas with a party that included singer Frank Sinatra's mother Dolly struck a 9,700 foot ridge of the mountain about 4 minutes after takeoff. All four onboard - Mrs. Sinatra, 82, her friend, Anna Stack Carbone, 67, Captain Donald J. Weier, 36, and co-pilot Jerald W. Foley - 43 were killed instantly. The trip was intended to be a gift from her son so the two ladies could watch him perform and do some gambling.

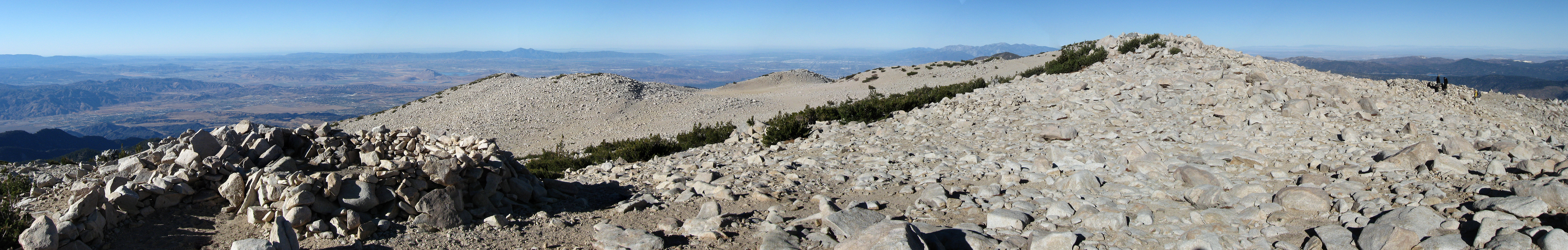
Pan looking west and southwest from Mt San Gorgonio.

== See also ==
- List of California county high points
- List of Ultras of the United States
