= San Gorgonio Wilderness =

Protected wilderness area in California, United States

- IUCN category Ib (wilderness area)
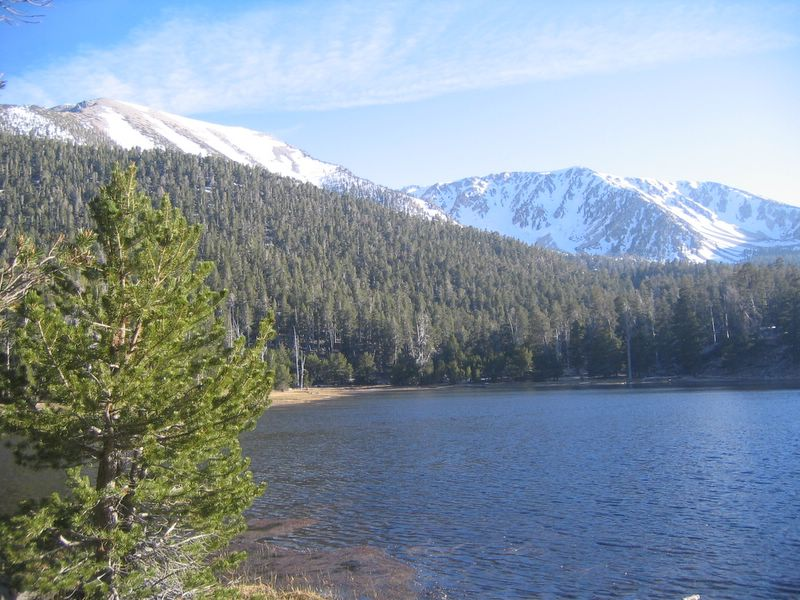
- San Gorgonio range from the Dry Lake campground
- Interactive map of San Gorgonio Wilderness
- Location: San Bernardino and Riverside counties, California
- Nearest city: San Bernardino, California
- Coordinates: 34°06′02″N 116°49′43″W
- Area: 94,702 acres (383.25 km^{2})
- Established: 1964
- Governing body: United States Forest Service / Bureau of Land Management

The San Gorgonio Wilderness is located in the eastern San Bernardino Mountains, in San Bernardino County and into northern Riverside County, Southern California.

It begins north of San Gorgonio Pass, approximately 2 miles (3.2 km) west of Morongo Valley and 10 miles (16 km) northwest of Palm Springs, California.

== Geography ==
The wilderness is part of the eastern slope of the San Bernardino Mountains, with topography rapidly changing from low, rolling foothills and canyons to steep, rugged mountains. These mountains include Mount San Gorgonio and several other peaks over 10,000 feet (3,000 m). Elevations range from 2,300 to 11,502 feet (701 to 3,506 m). Because of this elevation gradient, the wilderness reflects a transition between desert, coastal and mountain environments, including the different types of vegetation representative of each elevation.

The United States Congress designated the San Gorgonio Wilderness in 1964. By 1984, it expanded to 23,720 acres (96 km^{2}). In 1994, it was further expanded with additional BLM lands and it now has a total of 94,702 acres (383 km^{2}).

=== Sand to Snow National Monument ===
The San Gorgonio Wilderness is now within the Sand to Snow National Monument, established by President Obama in February 2016. It is managed jointly by the San Bernardino National Forest and the Bureau of Land Management.

== See also ==
- San Bernardino Mountains topics
