= Escalante =

Escalante may refer to:

== People ==
- Amat Escalante (born 1979), Mexican filmmaker
- Bernardino de Escalante (1537–after 1605), 16th-century Spanish writer, author of one of the first European books on China
- Enrique Escalante (born 1984), Puerto Rican volleyball player
- Francis García Escalante, Mexican transvestite who has become a famous actor
- Gonzalo Escalante (born 1993), Argentine footballer
- Jaime Escalante (1930–2010), Bolivian former mathematics teacher
- Joe Escalante (born 1963), American musician
- Jorge Volpi (born 1968), Mexican writer
- José Escalante (born 1995), Honduran footballer
- Silvestre Vélez de Escalante, Spanish padre and explorer in North America

== Places ==
=== United States ===
- The Escalante, a hotel in Ash Fork, Arizona
- Escalante, Utah
- Escalante Butte, of Eastern Grand Canyon
- Escalante Creek, Colorado
- Escalante Desert, Utah
- Escalante River, Utah
- Grand Staircase–Escalante National Monument, Utah
  - Escalante National Monument, Utah

=== Elsewhere ===
- Escalante Department, an administrative district in Argentina
- Escalante (El Apagado), a volcano in Chile
- Escalante, Negros Occidental, Philippines
- Escalante, Cantabria, Spain
- Escalante River (Venezuela)
- 5095 Escalante, an asteroid
- Escalante (Martian crater), a crater on Mars

== Other uses ==
- Escalante massacre, 1985 in Escalante, Negros Occidental, Philippines
- Escalante syndrome or Fragile X Syndrome, a genetic disorder
