= K'aayelii =

Navajo leader (c. 1801–1894)

Hastii K'aayélii (One With Quiver; c. 1801–1894) was a Diné leader.

K'aayélii was born around 1801 in Elk Ridge, north of Bears Ears. His birthplace was near a spring at the head of a canyon. Both were named for him with the corrupted spelling "Kigalia".

North of the San Juan River, K'aayélii was one of the principal headmen. He and his followers spent their lives ranging from the Henry Mountains, the La Sal Mountains, the Uncompaghre Plateau in Colorado's Allen Canyon, the Abajo Mountains, and Bears Ears. Like Hashkeneinii, K'aayélii had fled from the Utes, and brought his people to the Bears Ears area. They never surrendered and avoided the Long Walk, the forced deportation and ethnic cleansing of the Navajo by the United States government.

K'aayélii died near Montezuma Creek in 1894 and is buried there. Jack Jones, one of his descendants, attempted to reclaim their historical land rights but was denied by the Department of the Interior. His Utah descendants' attempts to acquire additional grazing land were denied by the courts in 1961.
