= Speaking Springs Preserve =

Nature preserve in San Juan County, Utah

- IUCN category V (protected landscape/seascape)
- Location within Utah
- Interactive map of Speaking Springs Preserve
- Location: San Juan County, Utah
- Nearest city: Bluff, Utah
- Coordinates: 37°17′49″N 109°33′41″W
- Area: 415 acres (168 ha)
- Max. elevation: 4,320 ft (1,320 m)
- Min. elevation: 4,320 ft (1,320 m)
- Created: 2023
- Operator: The Wildlands Conservancy
- Website: Speaking Springs Preserve

Speaking Springs Preserve is a nature preserve in southeastern Utah with red rock canyons, spring-fed wetlands, and Indigenous cultural sites. Situated within Cottonwood Wash on the Colorado Plateau, the landscape contains cliff dwellings, stone granaries, and petroglyphs that reflect Ancestral Puebloan and Navajo presence, and it adjoins Bears Ears National Monument. The 415 acres (168 ha) preserve is owned and managed by The Wildlands Conservancy as part of its system of preserves.

== Geography ==
Speaking Springs Preserve is situated within the Cottonwood Wash drainage of the Bears Ears National Monument. Its landscape features spring-fed wetlands, hanging gardens, and tall sandstone cliffs. Seasonal runoff from the Abajo Mountains maintains the riparian system and contributes to the canyon’s ecological diversity.

== Flora and fauna ==
The riparian forests and hanging gardens support endemic plant species and migratory birds. The area functions as a wildlife corridor within the Colorado Plateau, though detailed species surveys have not yet been published.

== History ==
The property had been ranched for years by the Guymon family. In 2017, a proposal by San Juan County to vacate the public road crossing the property raised opposition from Bluff residents and conservation groups who feared the loss of long-standing access into Bears Ears.

The Wildlands Conservancy purchased the initial 320-acre tract in July 2023 for approximately $2.15 million after a 16-month fundraising campaign. The acquisition involved negotiations with private landowners beginning in 2022. The purchase established a cultural conservation easement that allows public access, ecological restoration, and tribal stewardship. The preserve was the conservancy’s first in Utah.

In April 2024, an additional 95 acres were added, bringing the preserve to 415 acres.

The acquisitions were supported by individual donors, local residents, tribes, and conservation groups.

=== Cultural resources ===
Cottonwood Wash contains cliff dwellings, stone granaries, and extensive petroglyphs. Some designs, such as horses carved by the Navajo, overlay earlier Ancestral Puebloan symbols, including spirals. The area includes sites from the Pueblo II period (c. 900–1150 AD), reflecting centuries of Indigenous presence.

The conservation easement ensures the right of access for ceremonies and plant gathering, while prohibiting development. It is co-managed by the five tribes of the Bears Ears Inter-Tribal Coalition: the Navajo, Hopi, Ute Mountain Ute, Ute Indian, and Zuni Pueblo. The easement brings together a private nonprofit and tribes to jointly manage conserved private land. Tribal representatives emphasized stewardship and cultural responsibilities to the land rather than ownership as property. Some alcoves within the preserve have been designated for private tribal ceremonies. A Zuni Pueblo representative described the property as helping maintain connections with ancestral traditions and protecting cultural and spiritual values for future generations.

== Conservation and management ==
Before acquisition, the canyon floor showed impacts from ranching, including barbed wire, grazing, and debris. The conservation easement provides for tribal co-management, linking ecological protection with cultural values.

== Recreation and access ==
The preserve is open to the public for hiking.

== See also ==
- List of The Wildlands Conservancy preserves
- Bears Ears National Monument
