= Bears Ears =

Pair of buttes in Utah, United States

- The Bears Ears from Utah State Route 261

Highest point
- Elevation: 8,481 ft (2,585 m)
- Prominence: 2,000 feet (610 m)
- Coordinates: 37°37′42″N 109°51′59″W

Geography
- Location within Utah
- Location: San Juan County, Utah; United States
- Topo map: USGS Kigalia Point

The Bears Ears are a pair of buttes located in San Juan County in southeastern Utah, United States. They are protected as part of and the namesake of the Bears Ears National Monument, managed by the Bureau of Land Management and United States Forest Service. The Bears Ears are bordered on the west by Dark Canyon Wilderness and Beef Basin, on the east by Comb Ridge and on the north by Indian Creek and Canyonlands National Park. Rising 2,000 feet (610 m) above Cedar Mesa to the south, the Bears Ears reach 8,700 feet (2,700 m) in elevation and are named for their resemblance to the ears of a bear emerging from the horizon.

== See also ==
- List of mountains in Utah
