= Escalante National Monument =

Escalante National Monument was proposed by Secretary of the Interior Harold Ickes in the 1930s as a unit of the U.S. National Park Service in the canyonlands of south central Utah. Centering on the canyons of the Escalante River, the proposed monument encompassed portions of present-day Canyonlands and Capitol Reef national parks, Natural Bridges and Grand Staircase-Escalante national monuments and Glen Canyon National Recreation Area. The proposed national monument was to encompass about 4,500,000 acres (1,800,000 ha). The Second World War interrupted Ickes initiative, which had encountered resistance from Utah politicians.

The scheme was partially fulfilled with the establishment of Capitol Reef National Monument under the Antiquities Act in 1937 and Canyonlands National Park by act of Congress in 1964, and expanded with the proclamation of the Grand Staircase-Escalante National Monument by the Clinton Administration in 1996. Later proposals by the National Parks Conservation Association in the 1980s, former Utah Congressman Wayne Owens in the 1990s, and the Greater Canyonlands Coalition in the 2010s revived the idea, encountering renewed opposition from the Utah congressional delegation.

On December 28, 2016 President Barack Obama proclaimed the 1.35 million acre Bears Ears National Monument to protect Bureau of Land Management public lands and part of the Manti-La Sal National Forest south and east of Canyonlands National Park. This area was part of the 1936 proposed national monument.
