= Southern Utah Wilderness Alliance =

American non-profit organisation

- Abbreviation: SUWA
- Formation: 1983; 43 years ago
- Type: Nonprofit
- Tax ID no.: 94-2936961
- Legal status: 501(c)(3)
- Headquarters: Salt Lake City, Utah
- Board Chair: Tom Kenworthy
- Executive Director: Scott Groene
- Board of directors: Tom Kenworthy; Rebecca Chavez-Houck; Rusty Schmit; Sharon Buccino; Wayne Hoskisson; Ani Kame’enui; Regina Lopez-Whiteskunk; Oriana Sandoval; Kerry Schumann; Liz Thomas; Hansjörg Wyss
- Website: https://suwa.org/

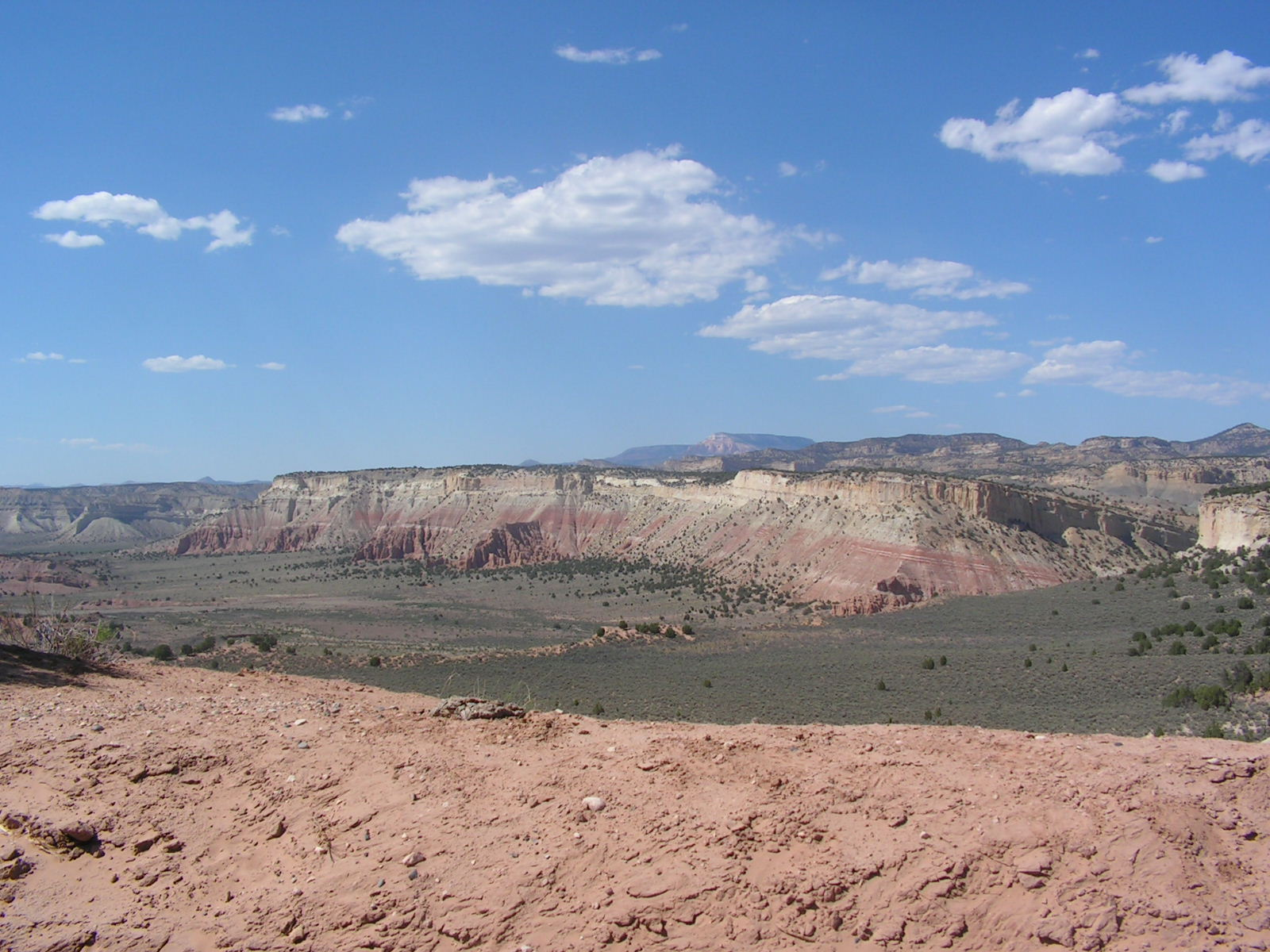
Grand Staircase–Escalante National Monument

The Southern Utah Wilderness Alliance (SUWA) is a wilderness preservation organization in the United States based in Salt Lake City, Utah, with field offices in Washington, D.C. and Moab, Utah. The organization formed in 1983 and is a partner in the Utah Wilderness Coalition, a coalition of organizations nationwide that support federal wilderness designation for deserving public lands in Utah.

== Campaigns ==
The primary campaign of the Southern Utah Wilderness Alliance is to build public support for America's Red Rock Wilderness Act, which was first introduced in Congress in 1989 by Utah Congressman Wayne Owens. The bill has been reintroduced in every session of Congress since. In 1997 the first companion bill was introduced in the United States Senate by Dick Durbin. On October 1, 2009, the bill was discussed in a legislative hearing before the Subcommittee on National Parks, Forests and Public Lands.

Beginning in 2015, SUWA supported the campaign by the Bears Ears Inter-Tribal Coalition seeking the designation of Bears Ears National Monument. SUWA is a plaintiff in two lawsuits challenging President Donald Trump's December 4, 2017 executive order reducing the size of Grand Staircase–Escalante National Monument and Bears Ears National Monument.

SUWA also works through the courts to protect areas in Utah that qualify as Wilderness under the federal Wilderness Act of 1964 from uses that would cause these areas to be disqualified from Wilderness consideration. Such uses include off-road vehicle use, oil and gas development, and mining.

== Notable events ==
SUWA participated extensively in the creation of the Cedar Mountain Wilderness. This approximately 100,000-acre wilderness area is located roughly fifty miles west of Salt Lake City and was established in January 2006.

SUWA also participated in the Washington County land bill, which designated approximately 256,000 acres of wilderness in southwestern Utah when it passed in 2009. Originally introduced by Senator Bob Bennet in 2006, early versions of the Washington County land bill failed to pass in two congresses due to opposition from SUWA and the Utah Wilderness Coalition.

On May 8, 2012, SUWA and Anadarko Petroleum Corporation announced an agreement concerning a proposed oil and gas development project in eastern Utah. Part of this agreement included a commitment from the company to avoid development in the proposed White River wilderness and a conservation easement on private lands purchased by the company. This announcement came as part of a signing ceremony for the project attended by Secretary of the Interior Ken Salazar.

On November 4, 2013, U.S. District Judge Dale Kimball ruled the Bureau of Land Management (BLM) failed to minimize the impacts of motorized use on the land and its resources and to inventory archaeological sites when the BLM issued its Richfield Resource Management Plan in 2008. The Richfield plan covers 2.1 million acres in Sevier, Garfield, Wayne and Piute counties.

On April 10, 2018, Utah state judge Lyle Anderson ruled to dismiss SUWA's complaint in SUWA vs. San Juan County Commission. The judge went further, questioning the propriety of SUWA's filing as a mechanism of “intimidation” directed at San Juan County Commission or others, and were directed to file a memorandum addressing this with the Court by May 1. SUWA appealed Judge Anderson's ruling to the Utah Supreme Court, with the Society of Professional Journalists and Utah news outlets KSTU (Fox13) and The Deseret News filing friend of the court briefs in support of SUWA's appeal, arguing that punishing SUWA for bringing the suit sets a dangerous precedent for the ability of Utahns to challenge local government.

SUWA played a key role in the passage of the Emery County Public Land Management Act, which was signed into law by then-U.S. president Trump as part of the John D. Dingell Jr. Conservation, Management, and Recreation Act on March 12, 2019. SUWA had worked to improve earlier versions of the bill that had failed to protect parts of Labyrinth Canyon and Muddy Creek. Following a deal between Senator Dick Durbin and Senator Orrin Hatch, the bill ultimately protected 663,000 acres of wilderness in Utah, making it the largest wilderness bill passed in the United States in a decade.
