= Oowah Lake =

Lake in the state of Utah, United States

- Location within Utah Location within the United States
- Location: Manti-La Sal National Forest, Utah, U.S.
- Coordinates: 38°30′04″N 109°16′25″W
- Basin countries: United States
- Surface area: 2.9-acre (1.2 ha)
- Surface elevation: 8,780 ft (2,676 m)

Oowah Lake is a small 2.9-acre (1.2 ha) lake located in the Manti-La Sal National Forest, in Utah. The Department of Wildlife Resources of Utah (DWR) stocks this reservoir with rainbow trout.
