= Manti–La Sal National Forest =

National forest in Utah and Colorado, United States

- IUCN category V (protected landscape/seascape)
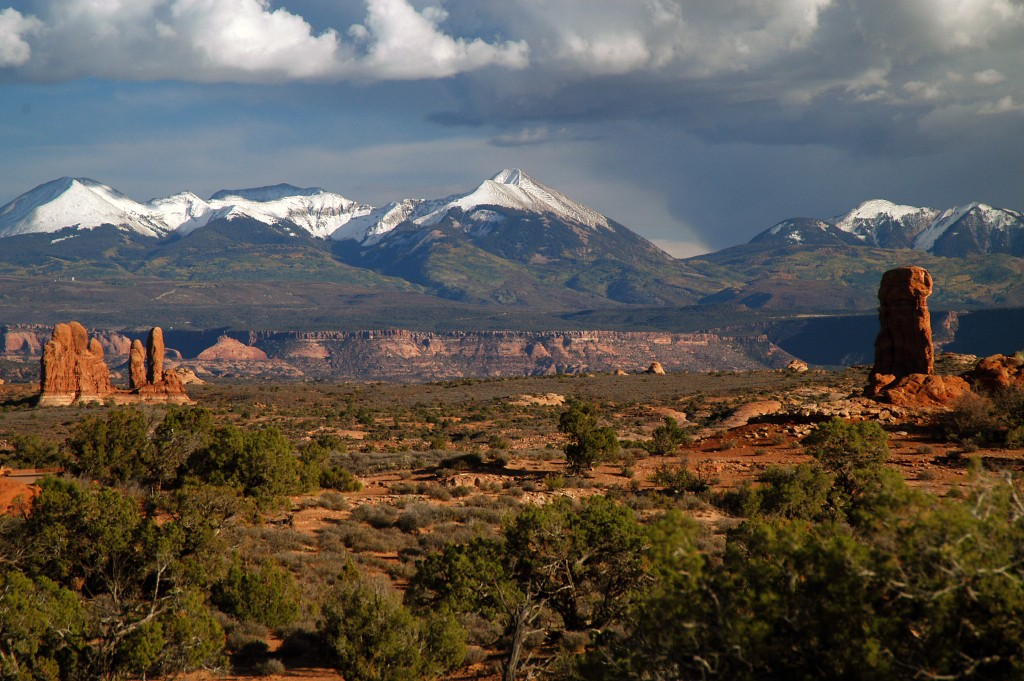
- La Sal Mountains as seen from Arches National Park

- Location within the United States
- Location: Mesa and Montrose counties, Colorado and Carbon, Emery, Grand, San Juan, Sanpete, and Sevier counties, Utah, U.S.
- Nearest city: Moab, UT
- Coordinates: 39°17′N 111°25.5′W
- Area: 1,270,886 acres (5,143.09 km^{2})
- Established: Manti–La Sal: August 28, 1950; Manti: May 29, 1903; La Sal: January 25, 1906
- Visitors: 900,000 (in 2006)
- Governing body: U.S. Forest Service
- Website: Manti–La Sal National Forest

The Manti–La Sal National Forest covers more than 1.2 million acres (4,900 km^{2}) and is located in the central and southeastern parts of the U.S. state of Utah and the extreme western part of Colorado. The forest is headquartered in Price, with ranger district offices in Price, Ferron, Ephraim, Moab and Monticello. The maximum elevation is Mount Peale in the La Sal Mountains, reaching 12,721 feet (3,877 m) above sea level. The La Sal Mountains are the second highest mountain range in Utah after the Uintas. Parts of the forest are included in the Bears Ears National Monument.

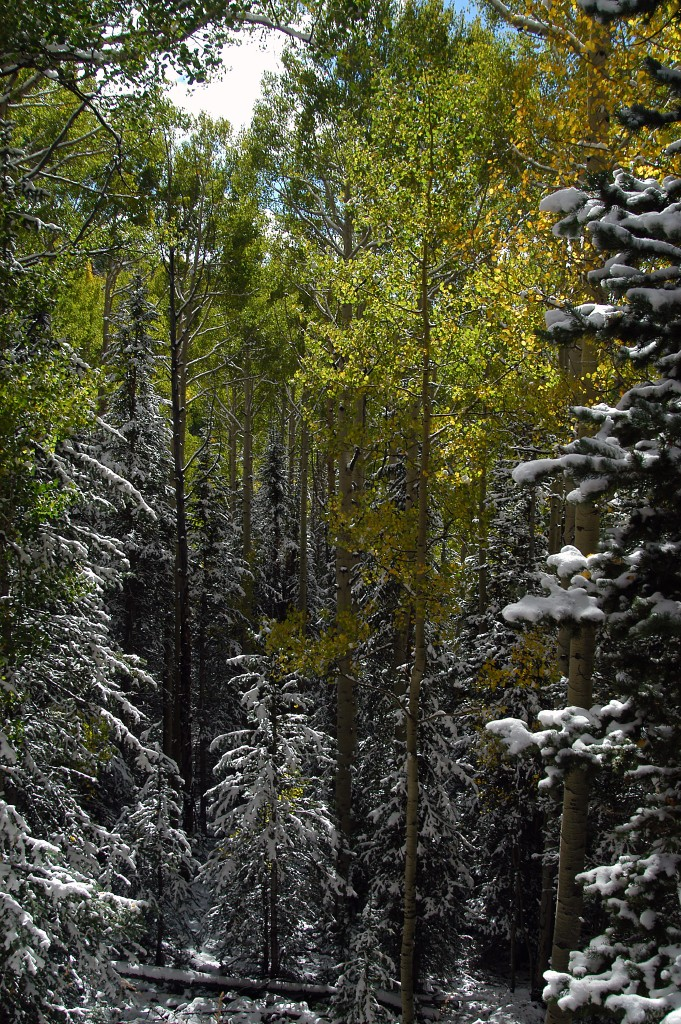
First snow in La Sal Forest

== Location and history ==
The La Sal Mountain loop road leads from Castle Valley to Geyser Pass and back down to Moab. Scenic Oowah Lake can be found within the forest.

In descending order of land area, the forest is located in parts of San Juan, Sanpete, Emery, Utah, Grand, Carbon, and Sevier counties in Utah, as well as Montrose, and Mesa counties in Colorado (Only about 2.1% of the forest lies in Colorado). Forest headquarters is located in Price, Utah. District offices are located in Ephraim, Ferron, Moab, Monticello, and Price.

The forest was originally established as the Manti Forest Reserve by the United States General Land Office on May 29, 1903, with 584,640 acres (2,366.0 km^{2}). On July 1, 1915 Nebo National Forest was added, and La Sal National Forest on November 11, 1949. On August 28, 1950, the name became Manti–La Sal National Forest.

On December 28, 2016, President Barack Obama proclaimed the 1.35 million acre Bears Ears National Monument, which includes most of the Monticello Ranger District on the forest and the Dark Canyon Wilderness.

== Recreation ==
Manti–La Sal National Forest is frequently visited for recreation. Many recreational activities include: Hiking, extensive trail systems for ATVs, the Skyline Drive in the northern district on the Wasatch Plateau, and an unpaved road tracing along the backbone of the plateau. The hiking trails view over the neighboring desert regions of Canyonlands National Park and Arches National Park. The Monticello District is home the Manti–La Sal National Forest's only wilderness area, the Dark Canyon Wilderness, a vast, remote canyon area. The Manti–La Sal National Forest, a 1.4 million acre mountain range, occupies parts of central and southeastern Utah, as well as parts of Colorado. The La Sal Mountains are lush with lakes, pine, aspen and evergreen trees, wildlife, and recreation.

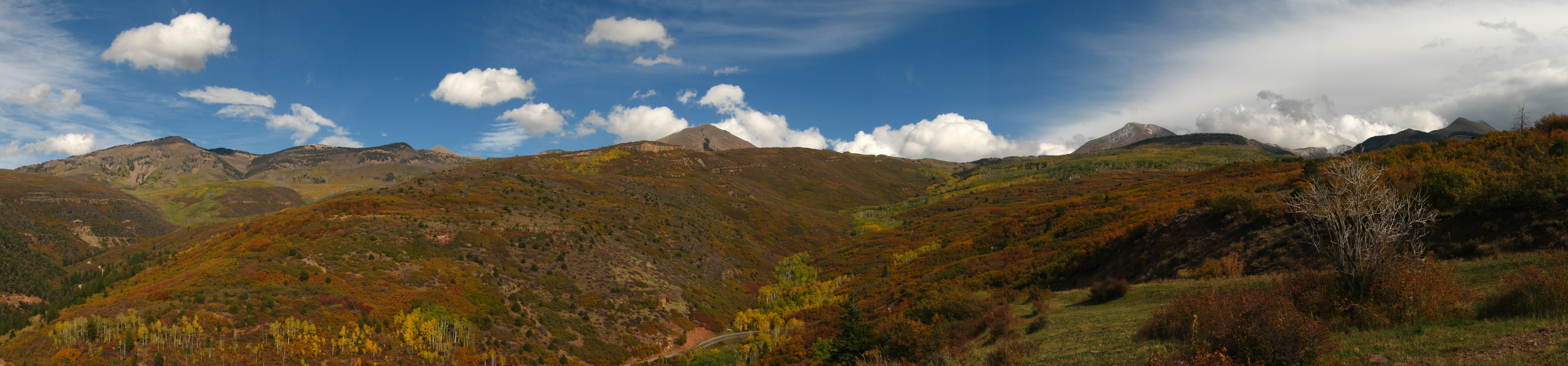
Fall Aspen foliage in La Sal Mountains

== See also ==
- List of national forests of the United States
- Dark Canyon Wilderness
- Trail Mountain Fire
