= Bears Ears National Monument =

Protected area in Utah

- Hoon’Naqvut (Hopi); Shash Jaaʼ (Navajo); Kwiyaghatʉ Nükavachi (Ute); Ansh An Lashokdiwe (Zuni)
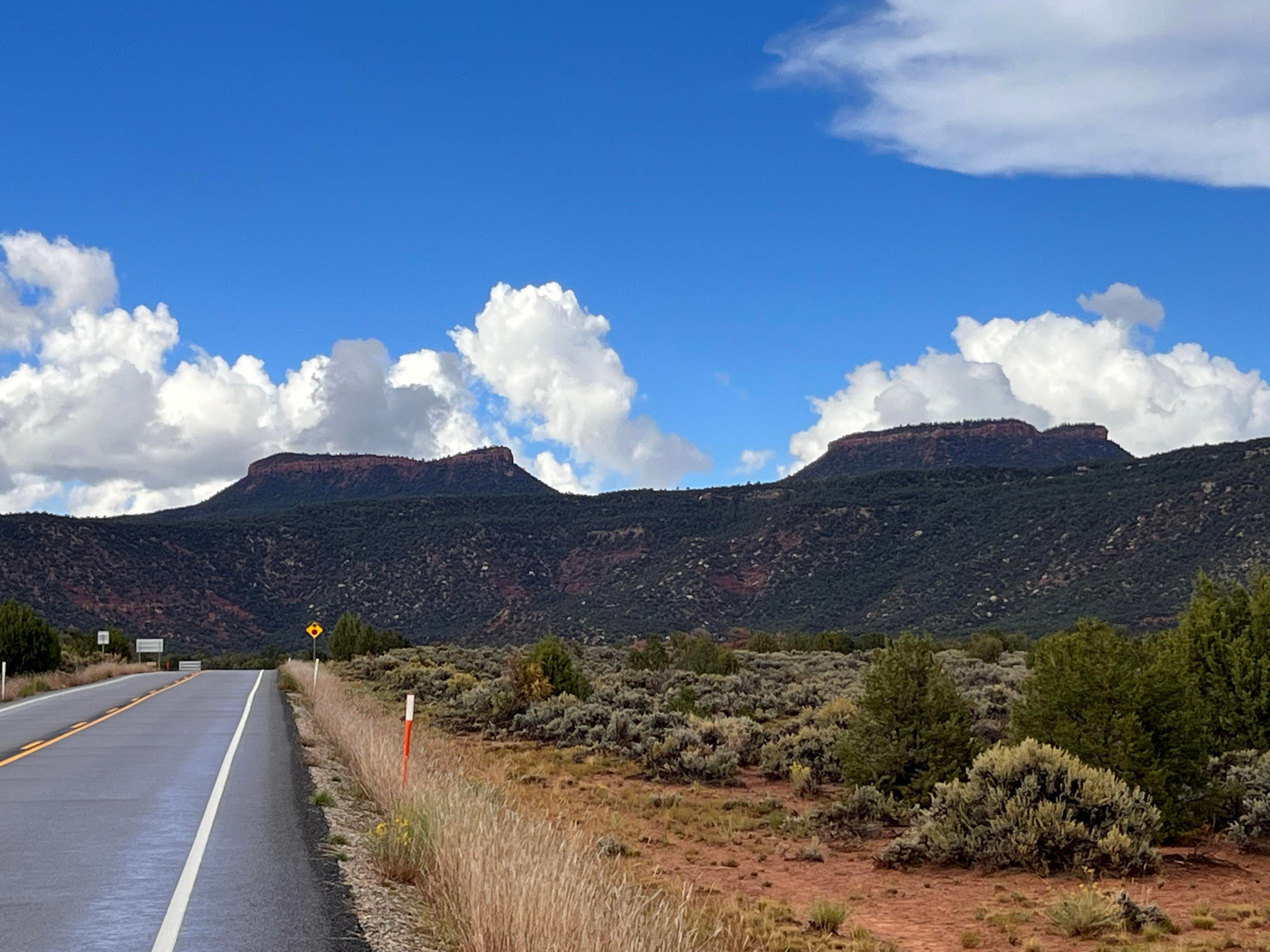
- Bears Ears buttes in daytime
- Location: Utah, United States
- Nearest city: Blanding, Utah
- Coordinates: 37.62961°N 109.86760°W
- Area: 121,000 acres (189 sq mi; 490 km^{2}) (2026)
- Established: December 28, 2016
- Governing body: Bureau of Land Management/United States Forest Service
- Website: Bears Ears National Monument

Bears Ears National Monument is a United States national monument located in San Juan County in southeastern Utah, established by President Barack Obama by presidential proclamation on December 28, 2016. The monument currently protects roughly 121,000 acres (189 sq mi; 490 km^{2}) of public land surrounding the Bears Ears—a pair of buttes—and the Indian Creek corridor rock climbing area. The Native American names for the buttes have the same meaning in each of the languages represented in the region. The names are listed in the presidential proclamation as "Hoon’Naqvut, Shash Jáa [sic], Kwiyaghatʉ Nükavachi/Kwiyagatu Nukavachi, Ansh An Lashokdiwe"—all four mean "Bears Ears".

The area within the monument is largely undeveloped and contains a wide array of historic, cultural and natural resources. The monument is co-managed by the Bureau of Land Management and United States Forest Service (through the Manti-La Sal National Forest), along with a coalition of five local Native American tribes: the Navajo Nation, Hopi, Ute Mountain Ute, Ute Indian Tribe of the Uintah and Ouray Reservation, and the Pueblo of Zuni, all of which have ancestral ties to the region.

The monument includes the area around the Bears Ears formation and adjacent land to the southeast along the Comb Ridge formation, as well as Indian Creek Canyon to the northeast. The monument also includes the Valley of the Gods to the south, the western part of the Manti-La Sal National Forest's Monticello unit, and the Dark Canyon Wilderness to the north and west.

When originally established in 2016, the monument encompassed 1,351,849 acres (2,112.264 sq mi; 5,470.74 km^{2}). A proclamation issued by President Donald Trump on December 4, 2017, reduced the monument by 85% to 201,876 acres (315 sq mi; 817 km^{2})—an unprecedented and exceptionally large reduction in the history of U.S. national monuments. President Joe Biden restored the territory removed by Trump on October 8, 2021. Trump again cut out most of the monument by proclamation on July 13, 2026.

== Features ==
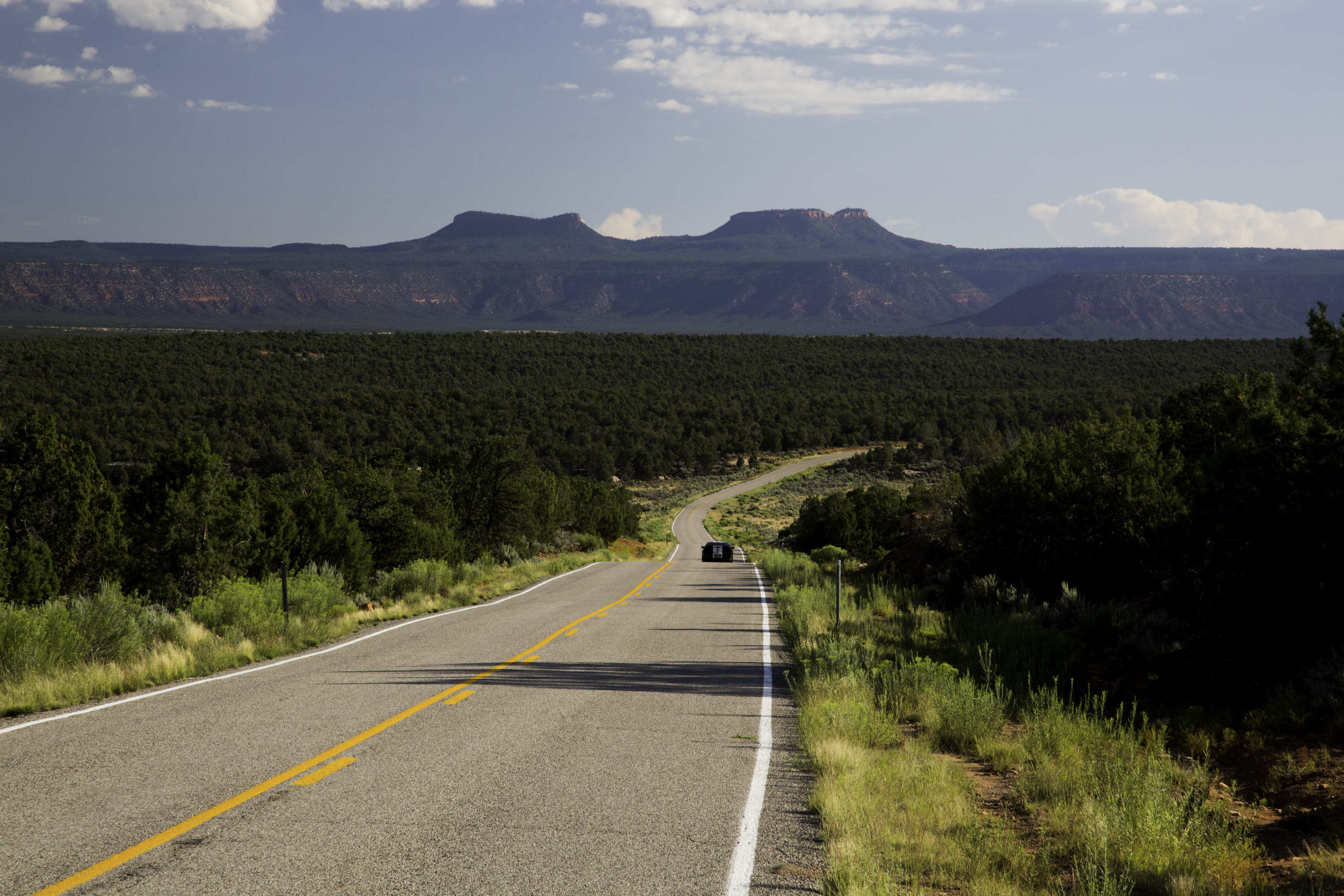
The Bears Ears from Utah State Route 261

The monument is named Bears Ears for a pair of buttes that rise to elevations over 8,900 feet (2,700 m) and 9,000 feet (2,700 m), which is more than 2,000 feet (610 m) above Utah state routes 95 and 261. The monument includes the area around the Bears Ears formation and adjacent land to the southeast along the Comb Ridge formation, as well as Indian Creek Canyon to the northeast. The monument also includes the Valley of the Gods to the south, the western part of the Manti-La Sal National Forest's Monticello unit, and the Dark Canyon Wilderness to the north and west.

Capped by Wingate Sandstone, the buttes and surroundings have long been held as sacred or significant by a number of the region's Native American tribes.

Slickrock canyon with sandstone alcoves at Butler Wash in Bears Ears National Monument, Utah, 2026

Ancestral Puebloan cliff dwellings dated to more than 3,500 years ago have been discovered in the region, just some of the estimated 100,000 archaeological sites protected within the monument. The Comb Ridge monocline traverses the eastern portion of the monument's Shash Jáa unit.

The vast majority of the land within the national monument is federal land, though the State of Utah owns about 109,100 acres within the original monument's boundaries, while 12,600 acres are privately owned. These state-owned and privately owned lands are not part of the national monument, and will not be unless they are acquired in voluntary sales to the federal government. The designation of the monument does not affect the rights of landowners in or adjacent to the monument's boundaries to access or use their property.

== Management ==
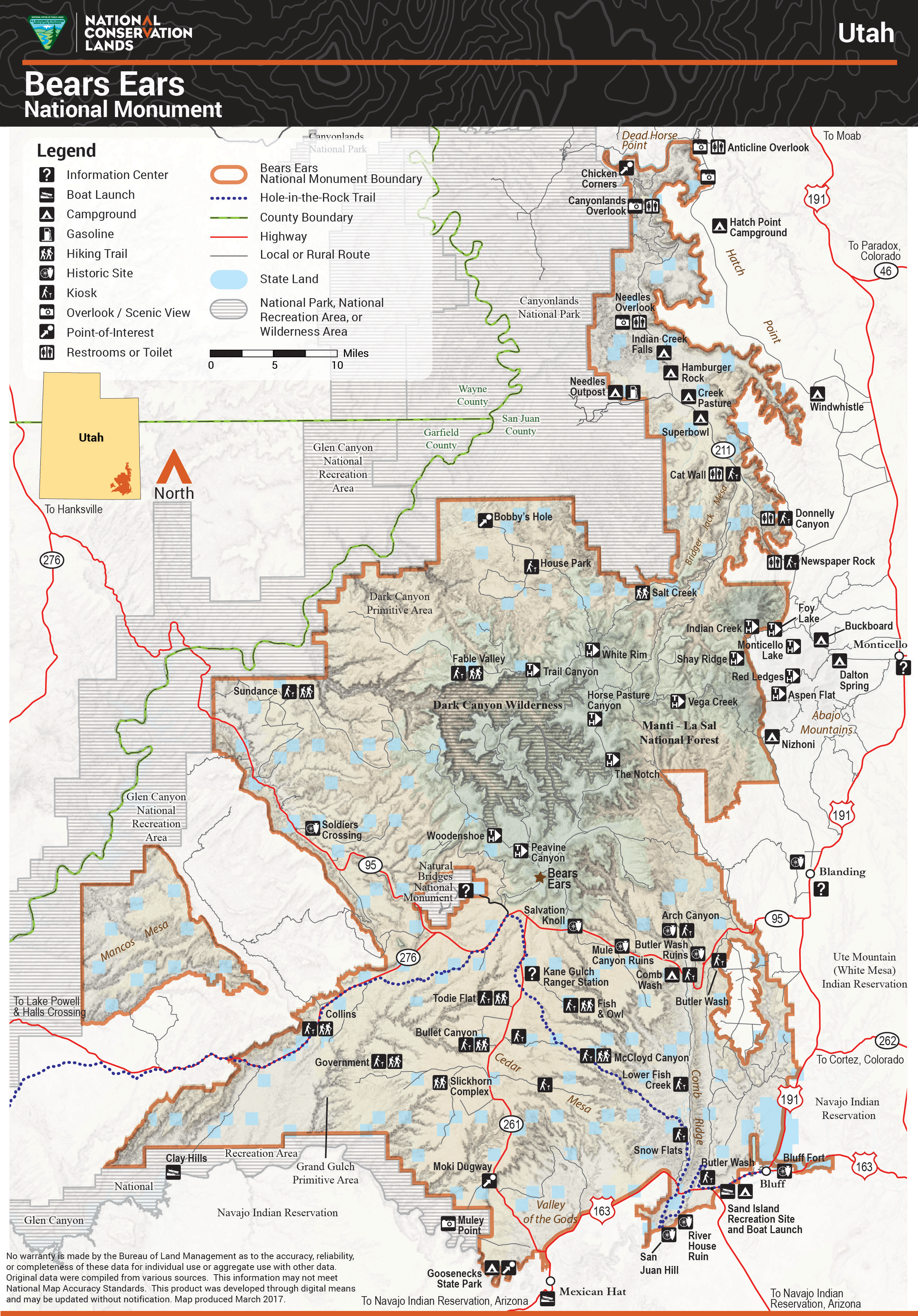
Map of the original monument boundaries (March 2017)

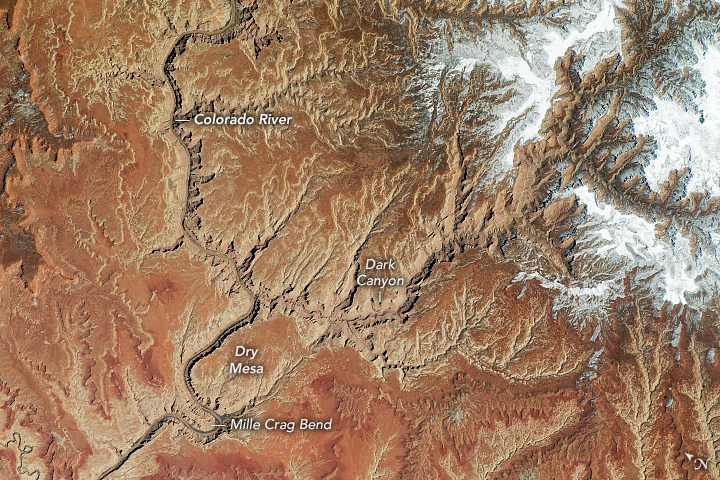
Bears Ears National Monument and the Dark Canyon Wilderness from ISS, 2023.

The monument is co-managed by the BLM and the USFS (the Monticello Unit of the Manti-La Sal National Forest), along with a coalition of five local Native American tribes—Navajo, Hopi, Ute Mountain Ute, Ute Indian Tribe of the Uintah and Ouray Reservation, and the Pueblo of Zuni—all of which have ancestral ties to the region. The establishment of a co-management program between the US Government and Tribal governments represents a monumental shift in government-tribe relations. The cooperation between tribes, tribal leaders and their governments, and the BLM/USFS with tribal governments represents a shift towards more authentic community consent-based land management. There are few other examples of co-management programs and Bears Ears has the potential to serve as a model for expanding this type of management. This program was made possible in large part by Indigenous activists advocating for their right to be involved in the decision-making process surrounding their ancestral lands. The Women of Bears Ears is one example of this advocacy. The Bears Ears Inter-Tribal coalition is made up from one member of each of the five tribes. The coalition worked on a land management plan for the monument that is representative of each of the tribes interests. Each leader took the plan back to their respective tribal governments to get approval for the plan to move forward.

Ecological resiliency is strongest in places that are the least disturbed and most biodiverse. Bears Ears is a resilient landscape. Navajo people have a term for such places of ecological rejuvenation: we call them Nahodishgish, or "places to be left alone."

— Bears Ears: A Native Perspective, October 2015, p.13

Robert S. McPherson, who is known for his books on Navajos and the Four Corners, described depictions of lightning, arrowheads, wind, snakes, and bears in the rock formations.

Prehistorically, Comb Ridge split an intensively used Ancient Puebloan homeland. It later had similar cultural—both spiritual and practical—significance to Utes, Paiutes, and Navajos and played a crucial role in the history of European American settlement. To tell the story of this rock that is unlike any other rock in the world and the diverse people whose lives it has affected.

— Robert S. McPherson

The northern part of the monument borders Canyonlands National Park, and parts also border Glen Canyon National Recreation Area and surround Natural Bridges National Monument. Of the 1.35 million acres of the original monument designation, the Bureau of Land Management (BLM) oversees 1.06 million acres and the U.S. Forest Service (USFS) manages 289,000 acres. Of the 201,876 acres of the revised monument designation, the BLM oversaw approximately 169,289 acres and the USFS managed 32,587 acres.

Some cultural special management areas remained within the reduced monument boundaries including the Newspaper Rock Petroglyph Panel and the Butler Wash Archaeological District National Register site, while other such areas that were no longer within monument boundaries including the Quail rock art panel, Big Westwater Ruin, the Sand Island Petroglyph Panel, and all but the last few miles of the Hole-in-the-Rock Trail.

== History ==
There are over 100,000 archaeological sites protected within the monument. The buttes and surroundings have long been held as sacred or significant by a number of the region's Native American tribes. In their proposal to have Bears Ears designated as a national monument, the Bears Ears Intertribal Coalition (BEITC) described the 1.9 million acres (7,700 km^{2}) on the southeastern Utah canyonlands Colorado Plateau as ancestral land. The Southern Utah Wilderness Alliance (SUWA) described the Bears Ears as "the most significant unprotected cultural landscape in the U.S."

As early as 13,000 years ago, Clovis people, who are considered to be the ancestors of most of the indigenous cultures of the Americas, hunted in Cedar Mesa, most of which is now included in the Bears Ears National Monument. Their tools, including the "Clovis points", have been found there. One of the oldest known archaeological sites with Clovis tools in Utah is Lime Ridge Clovis Site.

Regional map of Ancestral Puebloans, previously known as Anasazi, centered on the Four Corners

Following the Clovis people—at least 2,500 years ago—Ancestral Puebloans began to occupy the Bears Ears area. They left behind "baskets, pottery, and weapons". These are the ancestors of the Hopi and Zuni people who "moved from foraging to farming about 3,500 years ago". Archaeological sites of prehistoric American southwestern culture dating 3,000 to 2,000 ago, contained a large number of baskets used for storage of corn and for burial. The pre-Ancestral Puebloans culture became known as the Basketmaker culture. The next period, the Pueblo I Period, began about AD 500, followed by Pueblo II and III. The "complex cultural history" of these early farmers is visible in the remains of "single family dwellings, granaries, kivas, towers, and large villages and roads linking them together".

Along Comb Ridge (Navajo: Tséyíkʼáán)—a one-mile wide and 80-mile long "dramatic geologic fold" with some of the best-preserved cliff dwellings—Ancestral Puebloans lived in the "alcoves and grew corn" from about AD 900 to 1350. They relied heavily on domesticated corn, beans, and squash and a domesticated breed of turkey (Meleagris gallopavo). In the Pueblo II period, they "construct[ed] reservoirs, checkdams, and farming terraces in an effort to capture and conserve water for agricultural use." By c. 1250, the San Juan home of the Ancient Puebloans was "one of the most populous parts of North America."

Between the "mid-1200s and 1285" "nearly 30,000 people disappeared" from the San Juan region and resettled in the Rio Grande area of New Mexico and Arizona. They suddenly walked away from their home, leaving behind cooking pots and baskets. A 2015 article in Nature called it "one of the greatest vanishing acts documented in human history" in which the San Juan region "became almost instantly a ghost land." A "monster drought" destabilized the region in the 1200s, and Mesa Verde became overcrowded. When a second drought hit in the late 1200s, the mass exodus began.

Archaeologists and the Hopi "trace Hopi ancestry to the Ancestral Pueblo people, whom the Hopi call Hisatsinom meaning "our ancestors". "The Hopi had always considered the land occupied by their ancestors to be theirs: bounded by the junction of the San Juan and Colorado rivers in the north, the Arizona-New Mexico state line in the east, the Mogollon and Zuni rim on the south and the San Francisco peaks to the west."

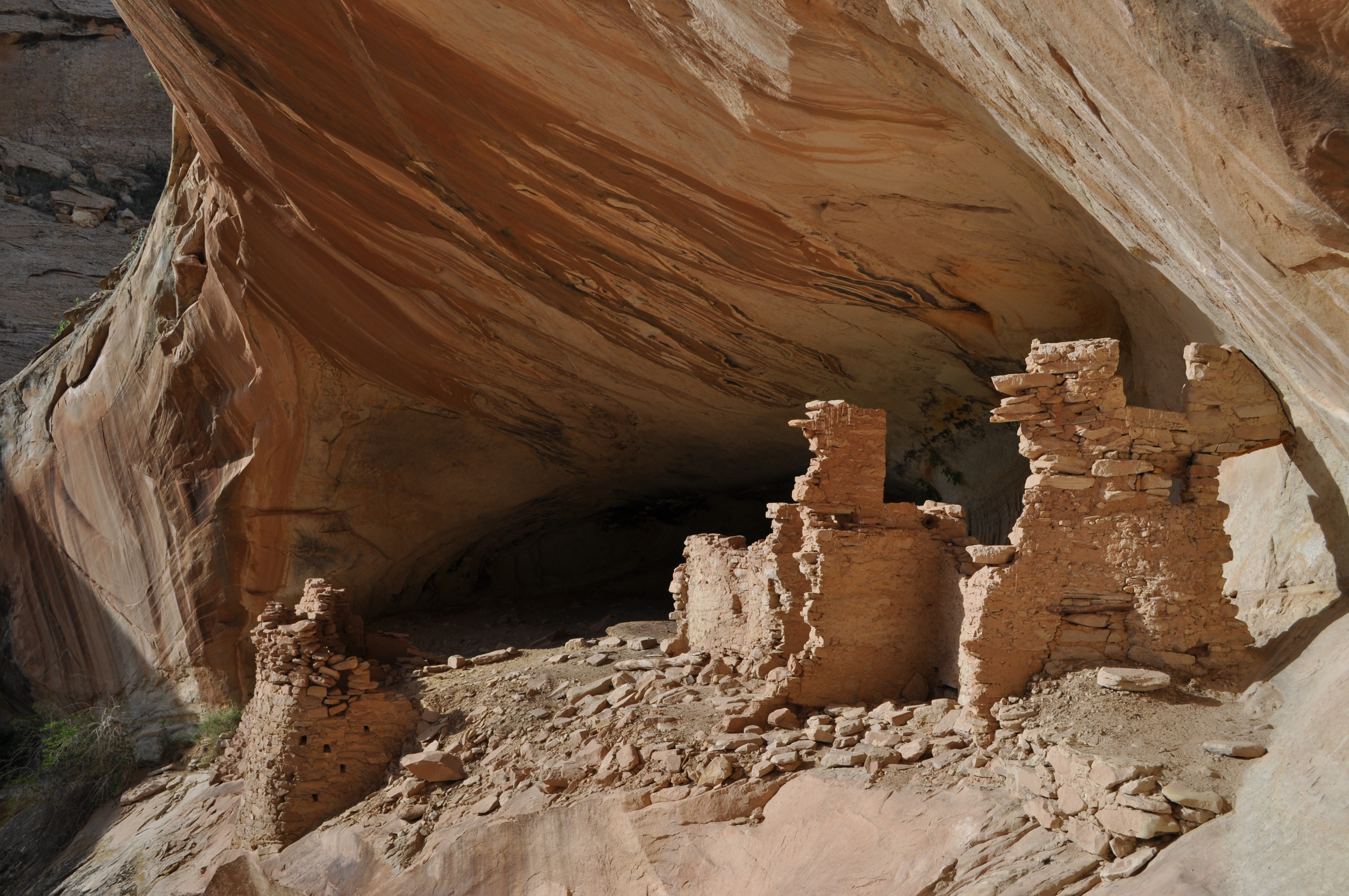
Monarch Cave Ruin, a cliff dwelling on Comb Ridge

The Zunis, who are descendants of both the Ancestral Pueblo and Mogollon, inhabited the deserts of Utah, New Mexico, Arizona, and southern Colorado "for a very long time". They "started irrigated cultivation of corn" 3,000 years ago. They have been in their "present location for up to 4,000 years".

In the early 16th century, Native American ancestral lands, now called Four Corners, was claimed by Spain as part of New Spain.

In 1848, the land was purchased from Mexico as part of the Treaty of Guadalupe Hidalgo. In the 1860s the Navajos were forced to leave their ancestral lands in what became known as the long walk to Fort Sumner. However, many Utah Navajos were able to stay in southern Utah by hiding in canyons. The history of these Navajo "differs somewhat from that of other Navajos due to years of their interactions with Utes and Paiutes as well as Mormon and non-Mormon settlers, ranchers, and traders".

In the 1880s, John N. Macomb and Ferdinand Vandeveer Hayden published maps and descriptions of the ridge. In 1880, 230 Mormon pioneers—the San Juan Mission expedition—followed the 200 mi (320 km)-Hole in the Rock Trail" down "Cedar Mesa to reach Bluff, Utah where they established the first Mormon settlement in Bluff in southeastern Utah.

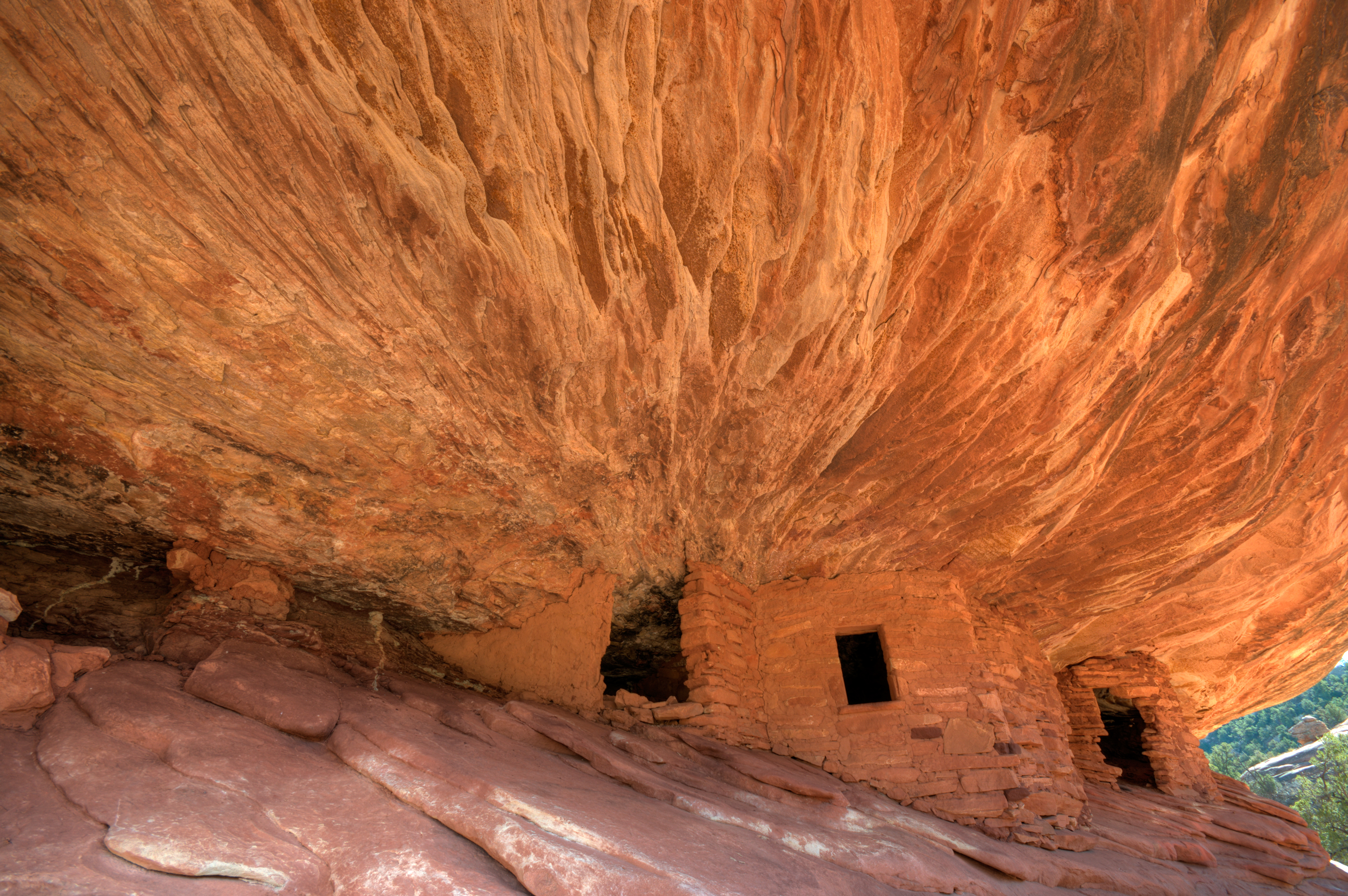
House on Fire Ruin, in upper Mule Canyon on Comb Ridge

In the 1930s, the area that is now Bears Ears National Monument, was included in an unsuccessful proposal to establish an Escalante National Monument of 4,000,000 acres (1,600,000 ha).

In 1943, western historian and novelist David Lavender (1910–2003) described the area in his book One Man's West as "a million and a quarter acres of staggering desolation between the San Juan and Colorado rivers, a vast triangle of land that even today is not completely mapped."

== Protection efforts ==
In 1906, President Theodore Roosevelt signed the Antiquities Act of 1906 which gave presidents the power "to create national monuments — a kind of second-tier national park—when federal land contains objects that are threatened by outside forces or which are especially deserving of emergency protection" in "recognition of the enduring power and dignity emanating from the earliest societies on this continent." According to a 2017 article in The Atlantic, the "act was explicitly passed to shield sites of historical or indigenous importance from pot hunting, in which Americans would loot artifacts from archaeological sites or abandoned dwellings and then sell them on the illicit market." Bears Ears has been looted and vandalized over a number of decades.

One of the early catalysts for securing monument status for Bears Ears was the June 10, 2009, joint raid called Operation Cerberus Action conducted by FBI and U.S. Bureau of Land Management (BLM) agents—"the nation’s largest investigation of archaeological and cultural artifact thefts"— in Blanding, a small town on Bears Ears eastern boundary.

In March 2009, when President Obama signed Utah Senator Bob Bennett’s Washington County Lands Bill, "many counties throughout Utah requested inclusion in the next bill." Senator Bennett invited Native people in San Juan County, Utah to engage in discussions on public land management of Bears Ears. San Juan County includes parts of Canyonlands National Park, Glen Canyon National Recreation Area, Hovenweep National Monument, Manti-La Sal National Forest and all of Natural Bridges National Monument, Rainbow Bridge National Monument and Bears Ears National Monument. The "ancestral lands of Bears Ears lie outside reservation boundaries" but "hold special historical and spiritual significance for regional Native people". The Utah Tribal Leaders Association began regular discussions on land-use negotiations to "advance Native American interests on public lands".

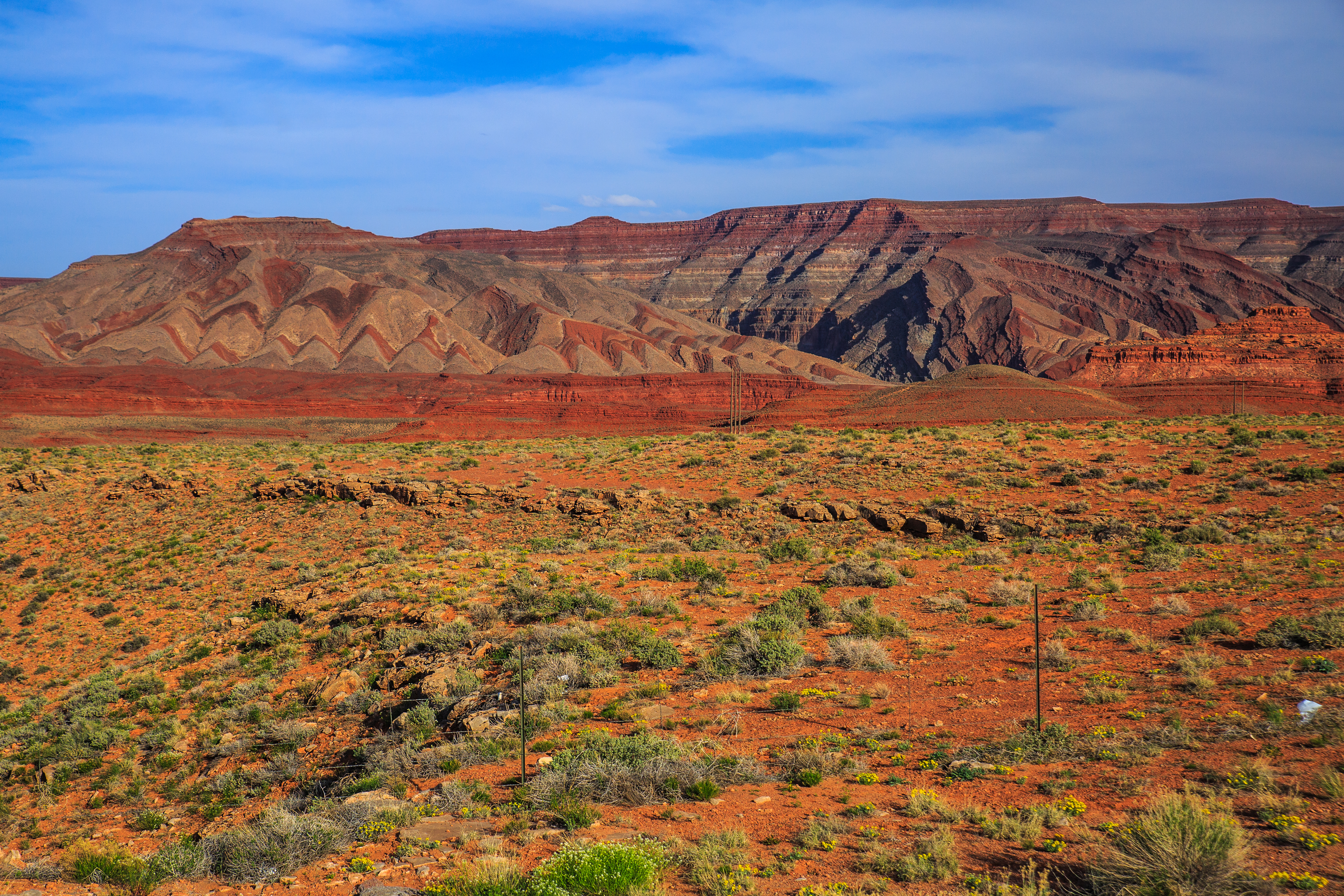
Mountains and desert off Route 95 in the southern part of the monument

In 2010, the Utah Diné Bikéyah (UDB) began working on a draft to be sent to "elected officials who were compiling a land-use bill". The UDB draft was endorsed by "all seven Chapter Houses in Utah." "Dine", which means "people", is the name Navajo people traditionally and historically use to refer to themselves. In 2010, Bennett became one of the most prominent targets of the Tea Party movement, on the grounds that he was insufficiently conservative. Mitt Romney strongly endorsed Bennett but he was denied a place on the primary ballot by the 2010 Utah State Republican Convention. With Senator Bennett forced out of office, the draft was not submitted.

In 2011, the UDB "engage[d] politically" representing Utah Navajos in the "early stages of the Public Lands Initiative process (PLI)". They published a book entitled Diné Bikéyah which compiled interviews with local elders and traditionalists that they had collected since 2010.

In 2012, the Utah Diné Bikéyah (UDB)—Navajoland—officially formed as an organization. The UDB spent 2012 in meetings with the Navajo Nation, the largest reservation in the United States, extending into the states of Utah, Arizona and New Mexico and covering over 27,000 square miles (70,000 km^{2}). The Navajo Nation and San Juan County signed a Memorandum of Understanding to "identify conservation areas, set aside wilderness, propose mineral zones, and pursue economic development opportunities."

In 2013, Utah Representative Rob Bishop announced the establishment of the Utah Public Lands Initiative (UPLI). In a report prepared by Bishop, Jason Chaffetz, and Chris Stewart, the Utah Public Lands Initiative was described as a "locally driven initiative" to bring resolution to some of the "most challenging land disputes in the State of Utah". The initiative is "rooted in the belief that conservation and economic development can coexist to make Utah a better place to live, work, and visit". SUWA participated in negotiations with Bishop and Chaffetz and their team "to try and find a compromise that would provide lasting protection for Utah’s ... public lands".

In 2014, the National Trust for Historic Preservation—in partnership with the All Pueblo Council of Governors, Friends of Cedar Mesa, Crow Canyon Archaeological Center, the Conservation Lands Foundation, and others—added Bears Ears to its National Treasures program. In 2016, the National Trust included Bears Ears on its annual America's Most Endangered Places list.

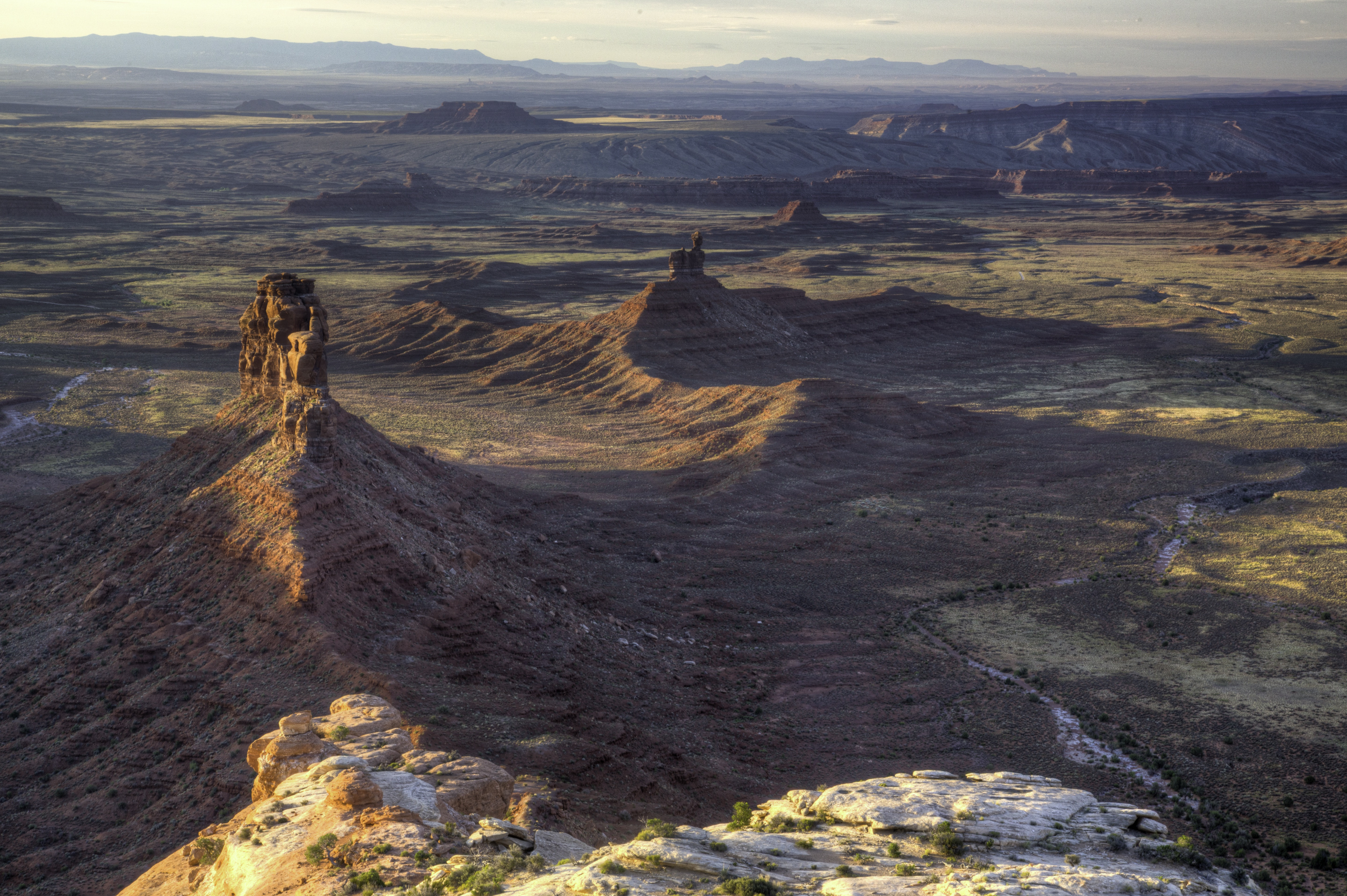
Valley of the Gods, an area outside the redefined monument boundaries of December 2017

In July 2015, representatives from the Hopi, Navajo, Ute Mountain Ute, Pueblo of Zuni, and Ute Indian Tribe formed the Bears Ears Inter-Tribal Coalition (BEITC). Professor Charley Wilkinson from the University of Colorado, who had a "long history of working on the Colorado Plateau", began working with BEITC on a "pro bono basis as senior advisor" soon after its formation. Wilkinson had drafted the 1996 presidential proclamation creating the Grand Staircase–Escalante National Monument. In October 2015, the BEITC submitted a proposal to President Barack Obama, seeking the designation of 1,900,000 acres (770,000 ha) as a national monument which would include Cedar Mesa, Indian Creek, White Canyon, Abajo Mountains, Comb Ridge, Valley of the Gods, and the confluence of the San Juan and Colorado Rivers. The Southern Utah Wilderness Alliance described how a "historic coalition of Native American Tribes" requested for the Bears Ears National Monument designation to "provide them with co-management authority to protect their ancestral homelands".

On July 13, 2016, Utah Representative Rob Bishop unveiled a draft legislation entitled Utah Public Lands Initiative Act (UPLI), a bill to "provide greater conservation, recreation, economic development and local management of Federal lands in Utah, and for other purposes". Bishop's UPLI draft bill provided protections for 1,100,000 acres (450,000 ha) through several smaller wilderness areas and two national conservation areas. According to a December 29, 2016, The New York Times article, Bishop, who is among those most critical of the Antiquities Act, opposes the designation of the Bears Ears National Monument. He supports repealing or shrinking the designation. Following the release of the draft, the BEITC pulled out of discussions citing that it was inadequate and a scaled-down version of their original plan. The Southern Utah Wilderness Alliance called Bishop's July 2016 UPLI the "worst piece of wilderness legislation that’s been introduced in Congress since passage of the 1964 Wilderness Act." In 2016, the SUWA stated that the UPLI "promote[d] fossil fuel development, motorized recreation, and control of public resources by the State of Utah, and include[d] unprecedented provisions that would limit federal land managers’ ability to manage public lands for the protection of natural and cultural resources".

The BEITC was not represented at the July 27, 2016, Senate field hearings on the potential impacts of large-scale monument designations. A resource management plan for the protection of Bear's Ears was signed by the Bureau of Land Management in 2025.

=== Looting and vandalism ===
Bears Ears has been regularly looted and vandalized for many years. In 2009, FBI and Bureau of Land Management (BLM) agents raided 16 homes in Blanding, following a two-year federal investigation and the indictment of 24 people for stealing, receiving or trying to sell Native American artifacts from the hundreds of archaeological sites in the area. This incident became an "early flashpoint in the struggle over control of public lands in the western United States." Included among those arrested were a mathematics teacher, a brother of the county sheriff, and a prominent physician and his wife. Three people committed suicide following the raid. From May 2014 to April 2015, there were reports of more than a dozen cases of "serious looting," ranging from "small-scale theft to ancestral remains being tossed around when graves are plundered."

A group of volunteers called Friends of Cedar Mesa, who patrol the Bears Ears area and report incidents to the BLM, "tracked seven major incidents of looting in the Bears Ears area" in the first half of 2016, including an attempt to cut a "rock-art panel of a humanlike figure" from a cliff using a rock saw.

There are legal trails for off-road vehicle use. Over the years "irresponsible off-road vehicle use" has damaged "both the natural landscape" and archaeological sites.

On May 2, 2016, the Bureau of Land Management and "Tread Lightly!" launched their "Respect and Protect Campaign" in response to educate the public on protection of petroglyphs, pictograms, dinosaur bones and tracks, among many of the other fragile features in Bears Ears.

== Designation under President Obama ==
Presidential Proclamation 9558 of December 28, 2016, by President Obama, established Bears Ears National Monument. The proclamation was published in the Federal Register on January 5, 2017.

On December 28, 2016, President Obama proclaimed the 1,351,849 acres (547,074 ha) Bears Ears National Monument, including the eponymous buttes and the surrounding landscapes, using his authority under the Antiquities Act to create national monuments by proclamation.

The intertribal coalition had proposed to include several areas that did not make it into the final monument designation like the Abajo Mountains (also called the Blue Mountains); the lower reach of Allen Canyon; Black Mesa; a "large, arcing strip of land" next to the Glen Canyon National Recreation Area, surrounding Mancos Mesa; Raplee Anticline, and "most of Lime Ridge between Mexican Hat and Comb Ridge." Their omission from the boundaries represented a "significant" concession to those who opposed the monument's designation.

=== Reactions ===
The monument has divided people in Blanding, Bluff and other Utah towns that skirt its border, and some members of families that are split on the issue have simply stopped speaking to each other. Signs reading "#rescindbearsears" stretch across gas stations and front lawns, which are strategically avoided by people who have taken to wearing pro-monument T-shirts.

— The New York Times May 14, 2017

The monument is in San Juan County—a county of 8,000-square-miles with a sparse population of 16,895. The federal government owns about 60% of the land in the county, and "Native Americans, the grandchildren of white settlers, corporations, environmentalists, the federal government" "jockey[..] to control it and its history". The monument's year 2016 territory makes up about 30% of the county's area.

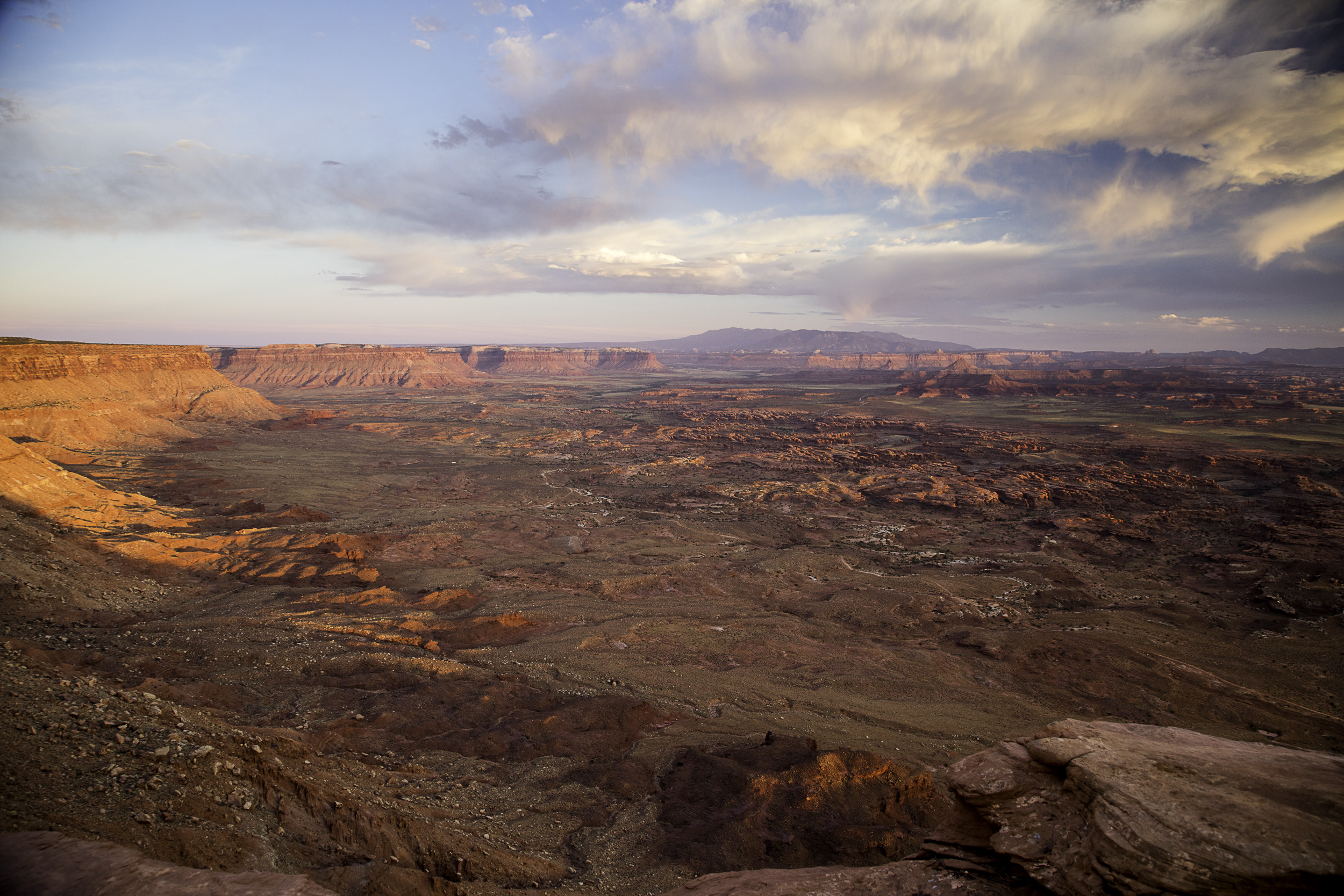
Indian Creek area at sunset

In a May 2017 interview in The New York Times 52-year-old James Adakai, "whose Navajo ancestors lived and hunted here for generations" described how, "We fought, we won the century-year-old fight: the monument. And now we're up for another fight. ... And everybody is against us. The Utah congressional delegation, the governor, the State Legislature, the county. They have a different plan". Phil Lyman, whose great-grandfather arrived in Bears Ears in 1879, criticized the designation as a "land grab", "equating the monument designation to grand theft". Lyman was concerned the Monument designation would "lock him and his neighbors out of their own backyards".

In December 2016, The Salt Lake Tribune reported that reactions to the monument's designation ranged "from scathing to celebratory" within the state. The designation was praised by the Bears Ears Inter-Tribal Coalition (BEITC) of Native Americans and environmentalists who had led the campaign to protect the land. Navajo Nation President Russell Begaye wrote that the president's decision will "protect this land as a national monument for future generations of Navajo people and for all Americans", while collaborative land management provisions "strengthened the relationship between our Navajo and American nations." Arizona state Representative Eric Descheenie, a member of the Navajo Nation, said "At the end of the day, there's only a certain place in this entire world, on earth, where we as indigenous peoples belong. And to be able to secure that, you can't put any money value on it." The establishment of the monument was also praised by the Mormon Environmental Stewardship Alliance.

Republican leaders reacted to the designation of the monument with disappointment. Some researchers and observers said that it was possible that president-elect Donald Trump or other Republicans might make an attempt to withdraw the designation and abolish the monument, though there was no clear legal mechanism for the president to do so unilaterally. Utah's Republican governor, Gary Herbert, said that he was "more than disappointed" and "deeply disturbed" by President Obama's unilateral decision. Congressman Jason Chaffetz reacted similarly. Utah Attorney General Sean Reyes, also a Republican, stated that "By significantly restricting access to a large portion of public lands in Utah, the President weakens land management capabilities and fails to protect those the Antiquities Act intended to benefit", and announced that he planned a lawsuit regarding the issue. A lawsuit against the FBI and BLM for its "heavy-handed and overzealous" looting raid in 2009, was rejected in February 2017 but "remains a point of contention for people in [Blanding], many of whom are also frustrated by the creation of the nearby Bears Ears National Monument." Utah politicians, including Senator Mike Lee (R), as well as ranchers and business groups, strongly opposed the monument.

== Monument reductions ==
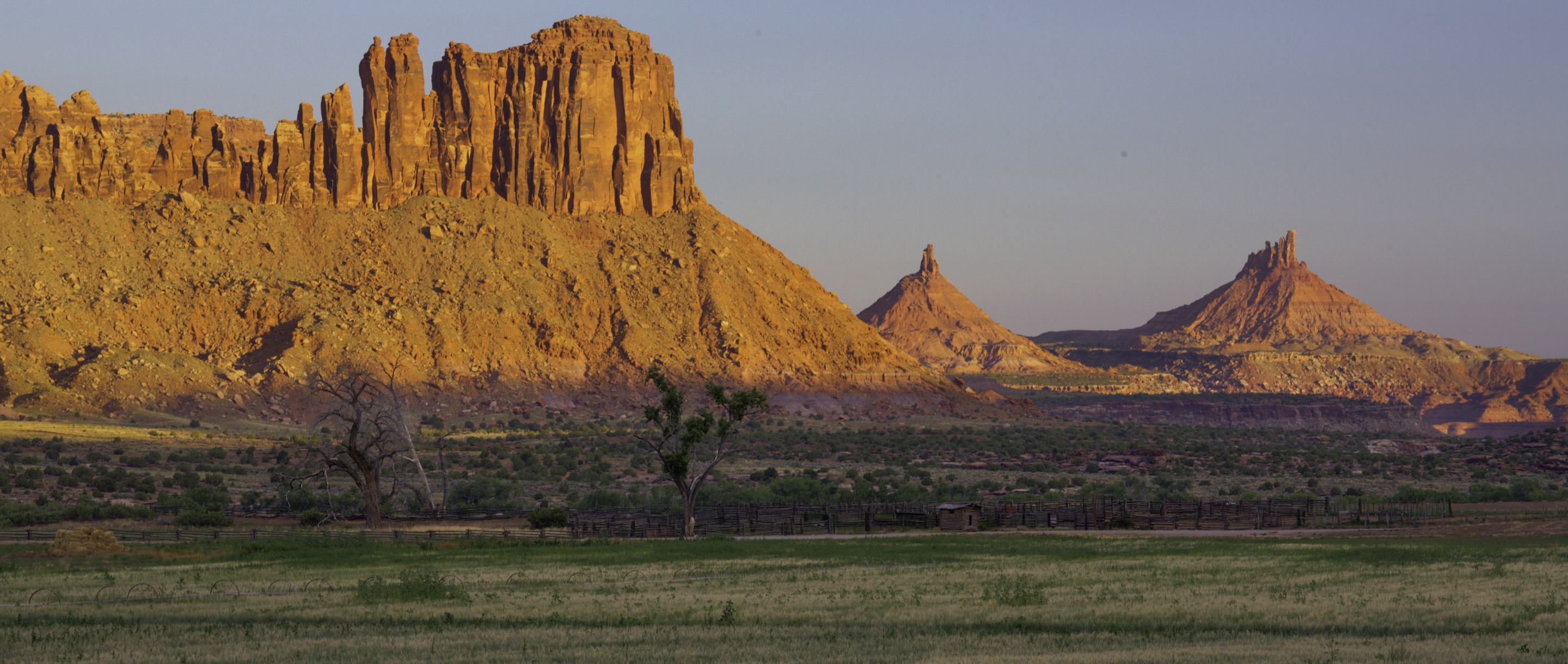
Indian Creek, Bridger Jack Butte, and the Sixshooter Peaks

=== Rescission proposition, February 2017 ===
In February 2017, Utah Governor Herbert signed a resolution passed by the Utah State Legislature asking Trump to rescind the designation of Bears Ears as a national monument. There is uncertainty about the authority for a president to completely rescind a monument designated under the Antiquities Act, as it has never been done before.

In response, the outdoor clothing company Patagonia announced that it would not be attending the Outdoor Retailer Market in Salt Lake City in 2017 or subsequent years due to the Utah government's opposition to Bears Ears. Patagonia urged other retailers to join it in moving to a state that "values our industry and promotes public land conservation." On February 16, the Outdoor Retailer Market announced that, after talking to the governor, it would no longer schedule its annual trade show in Utah (as it has done for 20 years) due to the Utah government's opposition to Bears Ears National Monument. The Outdoor Retailer show has 50,000 visitors and generates $45 million in local spending annually.

After the pullout from Utah, Colorado attempted to become the host of upcoming Outdoor Retailer shows. The organization Colorado Conservation put advertisements in Utah papers stating, "We have stronger beer. We have taller peaks. We have higher recreation. But most of all we love our public lands." In 2018, the show relocated to Denver as the host city for both the winter and summer Outdoor Retailer shows. In 2022, Outdoor Retailer announced the trade show would be returning to Salt Lake City for 2023 through 2025.

On February 21, 2017, the Southern Utah Wilderness Alliance announced that it would begin a statewide television advertisement campaign to build support for Bears Ears National Monument.

=== Federal review, June 2017 ===
On April 26, 2017, the Trump administration directed the Interior Department to review 27 monuments of at least 100,000 acres (40,000 ha) in size through Executive Order 13792. The order directed the department to consider the Antiquities Act "requirement that reservations of land not exceed 'the smallest area compatible with the proper care and management of the objects to be protected.'"

On June 10, 2017, Interior Secretary Ryan Zinke issued an interim report as requested in the Executive Order. He proposed a scaling back of the Bears Ears National Monument. On August 24, 2017, Zinke delivered a final report to Trump. The report called for the reduction of Bears Ears, Cascade–Siskiyou, Gold Butte, Grand Staircase–Escalante, Pacific Remote Islands Marine, and Rose Atoll Marine.

Davis Filfred, Council Delegate for the Navajo Nation Council, rejected the recommendation made by Zinke to shrink Bears Ears National Monument boundaries.

=== Reduction, December 2017 ===
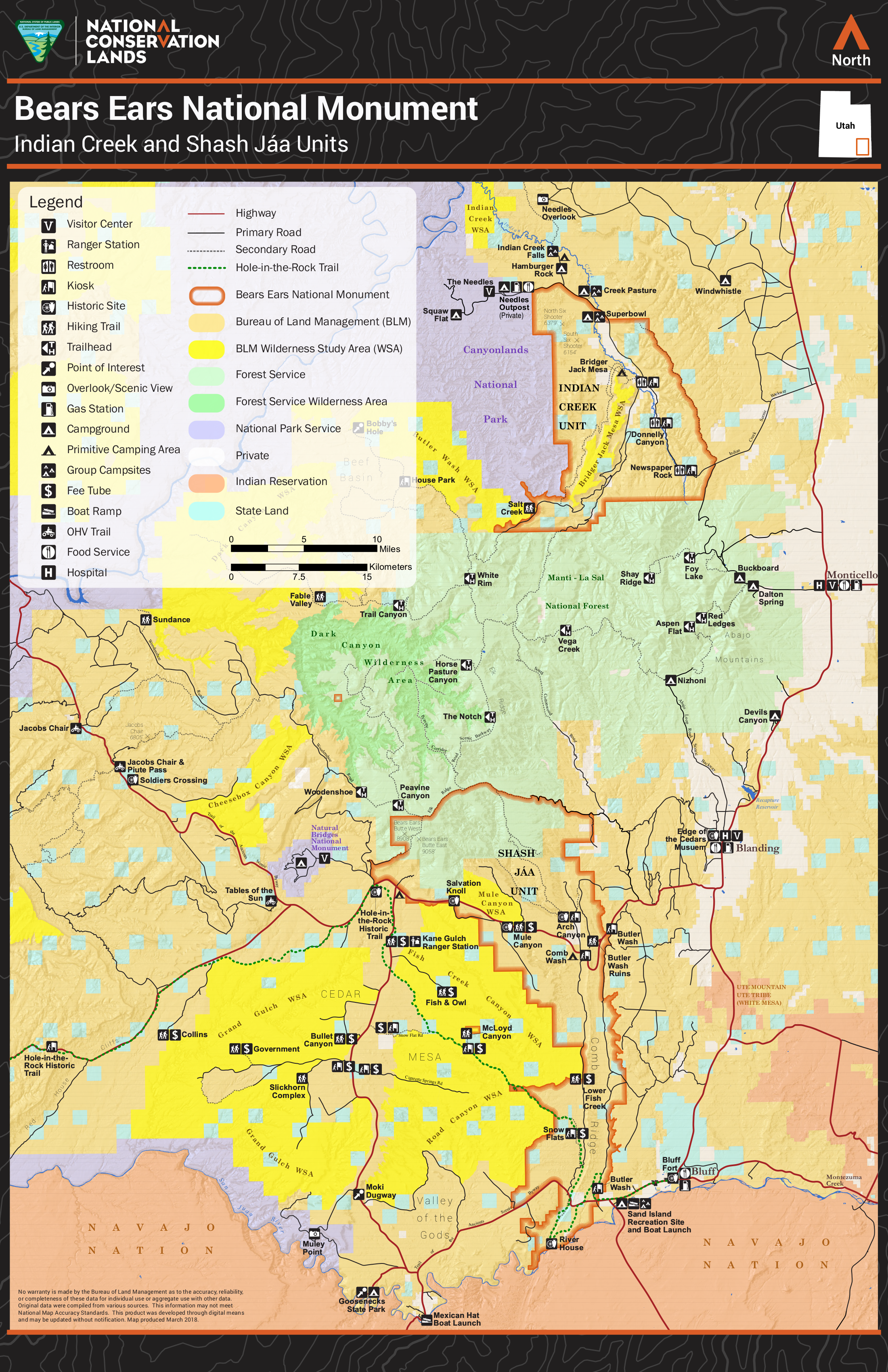
BLM map with the Indian Creek and Shash Jáa Unit boundaries (March 2018)

On December 4, 2017, Trump ordered an 85 percent reduction in the size of the monument, from 1.35 million acres to 201,397 acres. The boundaries were redrawn with two noncontiguous units named Indian Creek and Shash Jáa; the latter unit includes the Bears Ears buttes. Trump also reduced the size of Utah's Grand Staircase–Escalante National Monument by nearly 47 percent on the same day. About a month before Secretary Zinke began his review of national monuments, Senator Orrin Hatch's office sent a map with reduced monument boundaries to Interior Department officials. Those proposed new boundaries were mostly incorporated into the actual reduction.

Trump also restricted involvement of Native American tribes in management of the monument to only the Shash Jáa unit.

National monuments have been reduced by previous presidents, but not since 1963 and never to such a large degree. Legal scholars argued that the reduction is not authorized by law. The monument's reduction was seen as a victory for Republican officials and energy companies with mining leases for fossil fuel and uranium deposits, and a defeat for environmentalists and Native American tribes. According to Interior Department emails that The New York Times obtained following a successful lawsuit, gaining access to potential coal reserves in the Grand Staircase–Escalante's Kaiparowits Plateau was one of the central factors in Trump's decision to shrink the size of the Monument by approximately 47%. DOI staff were directed by Secretary Zinke in spring 2017 to calculate potential coal, oil and natural gas deposits as well as potential grazing land and timber in protected areas. They reported that there was an estimated 11.36 billion tons of recoverable coal in the Kaiparowits Plateau, which represents "one of the largest coal deposits" in the country. The Times' documents revealed extensive lobbying on the part of uranium companies—such as Canada's Energy Fuels, which included maps submitted in May to Zinke that marked areas the uranium companies "wanted removed from the monument".

More than 300 uranium mining claims are located inside the original monument boundaries, with the large majority of those claims being located outside the reduced boundaries. Energy Fuels, a U.S. uranium producer, operates the only uranium and vanadium mine mill in the U.S. near the monument's original boundaries via their subsidiary Energy Fuels Resources. The company, along with other mining firms, had lobbied hard for the reduction. Energy Fuels states that they asked the Trump Administration for only minor boundary adjustments that "would have impacted about 2.5 percent of the total land area of the monument" and that they did not ask for the 85% reduction. In March 2021, the company stated that it did not hold any claims in the monument and that media reports claiming they held properties in the monument were based on a clerical error. As of April 2021 Energy Fuels expected to produce rare earth elements, needed for various clean energy and advanced technologies.

=== Bill proposing two monuments ===
On December 4, 2017, Utah Congressman John Curtis, along with fellow Utah representatives Rob Bishop, Chris Stewart and Mia Love, introduced a bill that would codify the Trump administration's reduction of Bears Ears National Monument by creating two new national monuments in the remaining areas defined by the president. The monuments would be named Shash Jáa National Monument and Indian Creek National Monument. Shash Jáa would be managed by a council of seven members, including four from Native American tribes, while Indian Creek would be managed by a council of five with just one Native American member.

On January 9, 2018, members of the Tribes of the Bears Ears Inter-Tribal Coalition testified against the bill with Shaun Chapoose, a member of the Ute Indian Tribe and Utah Business Committee, stating "Congressman Bishop’s [committee chairman] contempt for the United States government-to-government relationship with Indian tribes and the legislative process in his own Committee was on full display during the hearing." The bill would have effectively negated any legal challenges to the reduction. The bill died in committee.

=== Legal challenges to the reduction, December 2017 ===
Three separate federal lawsuits were filed by December 7, 2017 challenging the reduction of Bears Ears National Monument. The plaintiffs include five Native American tribes, a private corporation, conservation groups, and several non-profit organizations and NGOs. The groups have argued that the reduction is not authorized by law.

The three federal lawsuits are:

- Natural Resources Defense Council v. Trump (and four administration officials) – filed December 7, 2017 by 11 environmentalist and conservationist groups who argue that "Only Congress—not the President—has the power to revoke or modify a national monument. President Trump’s proclamation purporting to dismantle Bears Ears National Monument exceeded his authority and is unlawful." The plaintiffs are the Natural Resources Defense Council, the National Parks Conservation Association, The Wilderness Society, Southern Utah Wilderness Alliance, Sierra Club, Center for Biological Diversity, Defenders of Wildlife, Grand Canyon Trust, Great Old Broads For Wilderness, Western Watersheds Project, and WildEarth Guardians.
- Hopi Tribe v. Trump – filed December 4, 2017 by five Native American tribes—the Hopi Tribe, Navajo Nation, Ute Indian Tribe, Ute Mountain Ute Tribe, and Zuni Tribe—against Trump and four administration officials. The plaintiff tribes argue that Trump's significant reduction in Bears Ears National Monument infringes on Congress's power in violation of the constitutional principles of separation of powers. The plaintiff tribes also argue that Trump's shrinkage violates the Antiquities Act of 1906.
- Patagonia Inc., an outdoor retailer, has also sued over the reduction of Bears Ears, December 5, 2017. Patagonia, like others in the outdoor recreation industry, has been outspoken against the Trump administration actions, posting on its website a message reading, "The president stole your land. In an illegal move, the president just reduced the size of Bears Ears and Grand Staircase–Escalante National Monuments. This is the largest elimination of protected land in American history."

The three suits were consolidated at the United States District Court for the District of Columbia in January 2018, and in January 2020 the plaintiffs filed for summary judgment. The case was not yet decided at the time of the 2020 election.

Sixteen national monuments were reduced in 18 separate acts by previous presidents, but not by any president since 1963. The largest previous reduction by acreage was President Woodrow Wilson's 1915 removal of 299,370 acres (121,150 ha) from the Mount Olympus National Monument established by Theodore Roosevelt in 1909. The largest reduction by percentage was Navajo National Monument by 90% (from about 3,715 acres to 360 acres) by President William Howard Taft in 1912 after he established it three years prior.

=== Restoration, October 2021 ===
On his first day in office, President Joe Biden signed an executive order calling for a review of the reduction of the Bears Ears and Grand Staircase–Escalante monuments. In early April 2021, Deb Haaland, the first Native American Secretary of the Interior, began the onsite review process.

On October 8, 2021, President Biden restored the original 2016 boundaries of Bears Ears National Monument, retaining 11,000 acres (4,500 ha) that Trump had added, for a total protected area of 1.36 million acres. The Bureau of Land Management will increase staffing and funding to protect the monument's resources and manage increased visitation.

A 2025 poll found 71% of voters in Utah supported Bears Ears National Monument.

=== Lawsuits, December 2022 ===
Two lawsuits, Garfield County v. Biden, filed by the state of Utah and two Utah counties, and Dalton v. Biden, filed by a mining company and recreationalists, seek to overturn the reaffirmed original boundaries and attack the Antiquities Act. The tribes filed motions to intervene.

On August 11, 2023, U.S. District Judge David Nuffer dismissed both cases, explaining that "the Antiquities Act gives the president broad authority to designate national monuments and that courts cannot second-guess that authority." The state of Utah and other parties have since appealed the dismissal, but no such challenge has been successful in 100 years of the Antiquity Act's history. The United States Court of Appeals for the Tenth Circuit heard the case in September 2024; in its ruling in June 2026, the Tenth Circuit affirmed the ruling in part, vacated it in part, and remanded the case for further review.

=== Second reduction, July 2026 ===
On July 13, 2026, President Trump issued Proclamation 9558, reducing the size of Bears Ears National Monument from 1.36 million acres to 121,100 acres, an over 90% decrease in size. Leadership of the Utah Republican Party, including Utah governor Spencer Cox and Utah senator Mike Lee, had lobbied to reopen the land for mining.

== See also ==
- List of national monuments of the United States
- Grand Staircase–Escalante National Monument
