= Comb Ridge =

Landform in Utah and Arizona, US

Comb Ridge Tséyíkʼáán (in Navajo)
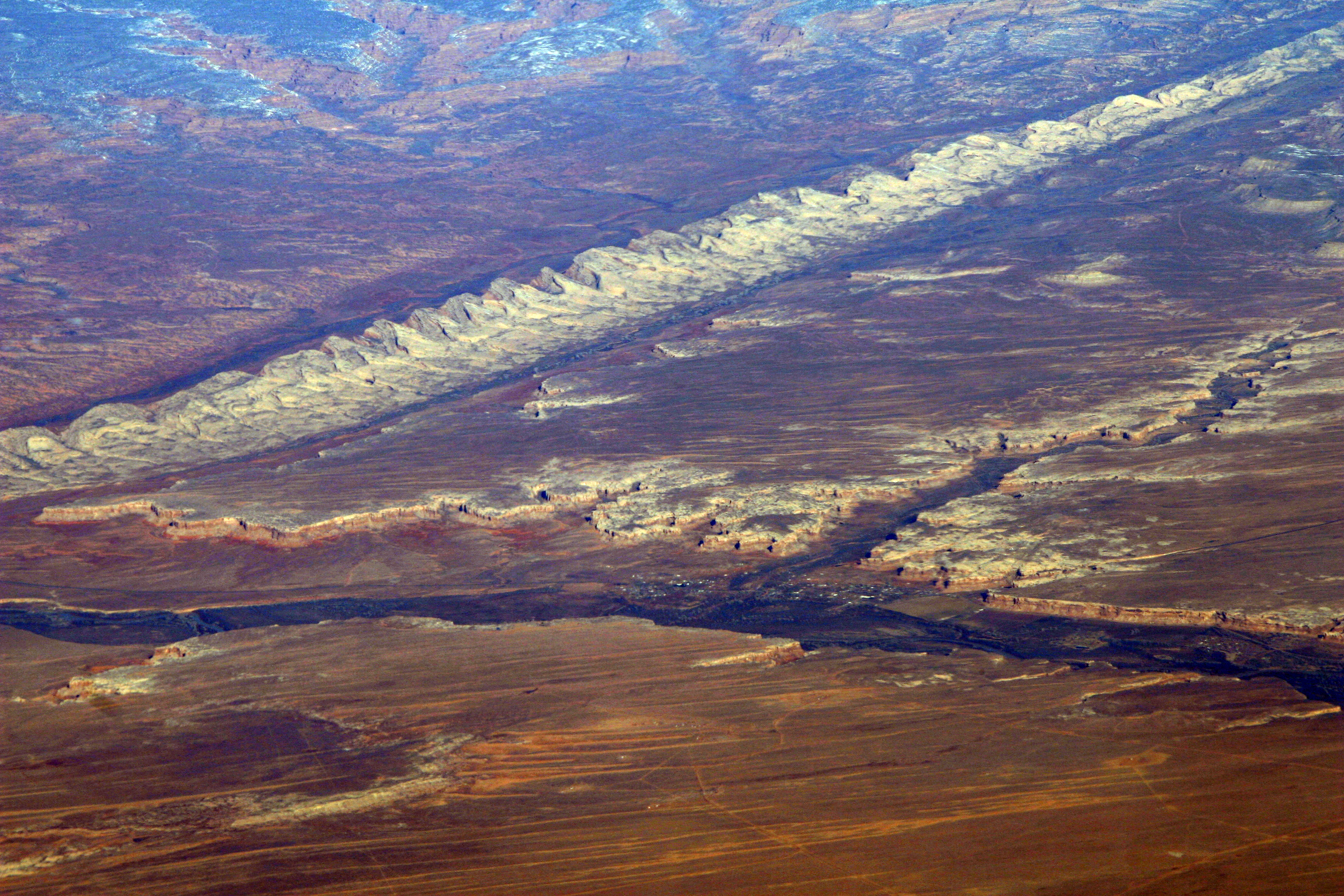
- Comb Ridge from the air, above Bluff Utah and the San Juan River
- Interactive map of Comb Ridge; Tséyíkʼáán (in Navajo)
- Location: Utah and Arizona
- Nearest city: Blanding, Utah
- Coordinates: 37°25′39″N 109°38′47″W
- Designated: 1976

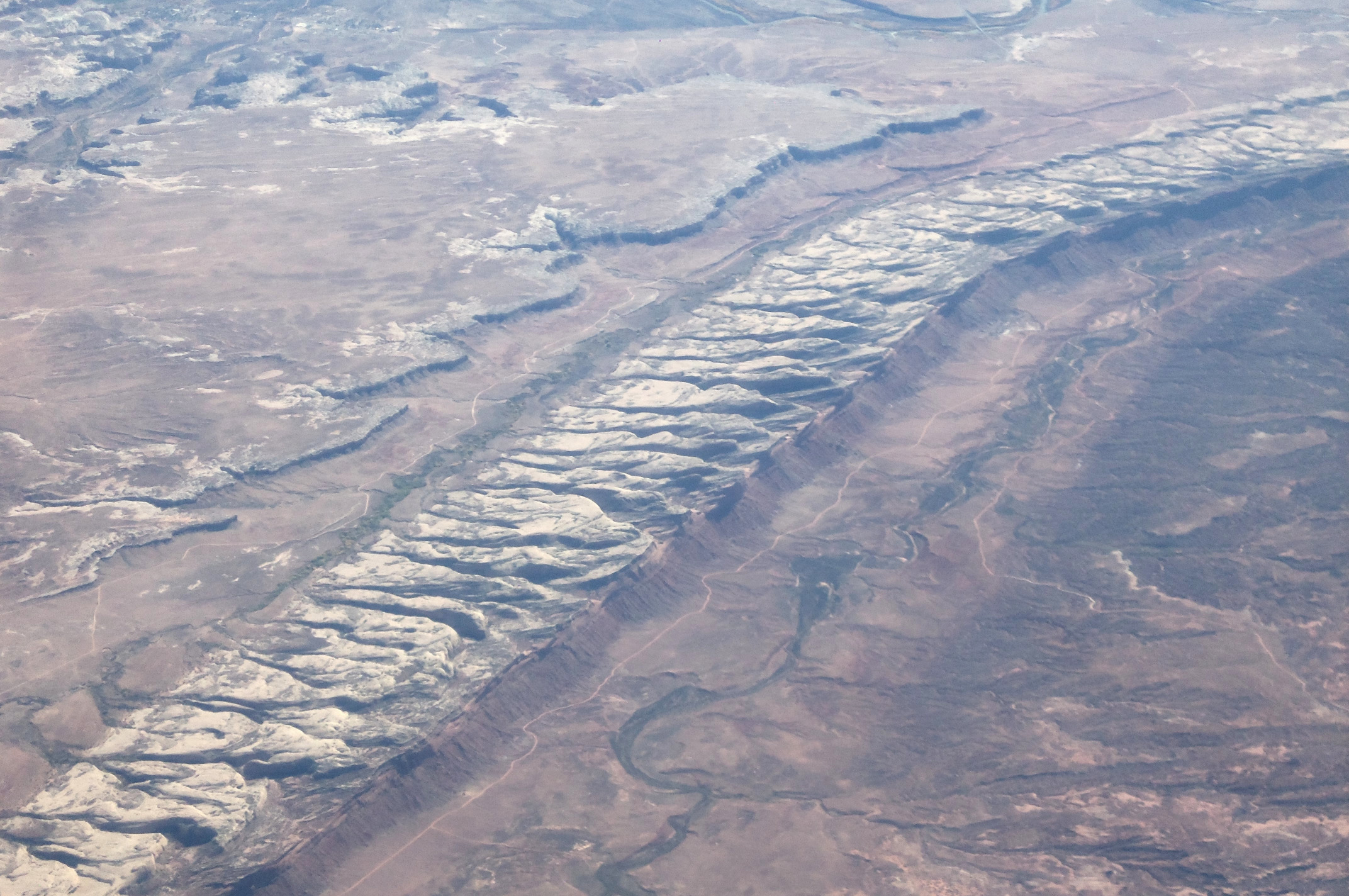
Another oblique view looking in approximately the opposite direction as the above photo

Comb Ridge (Navajo: Tséyíkʼáán) is a linear north to south-trending monocline nearly 80 miles long in Southeastern Utah and Northeastern Arizona. Its northern end merges with the Abajo Mountains some eleven miles west of Blanding. It extends essentially due south for 45 km (28 mi) to the San Juan River. South of the San Juan the ridge turns to the southwest and is more subdued in expression as it extends for an additional 67 km (42 mi) to Laguna Creek 9 km (5.6 mi) east of Kayenta, Arizona.

It was designated a National Natural Landmark in 1976 as the only North American location of tritylodont fossils. Parts of the ridge in Utah are protected as part of the Bears Ears National Monument.

== Geology ==
The geologic formations involved in the east dipping strata of the fold include the Jurassic aged Navajo Sandstone, Kayenta Formation, Wingate Sandstone, Chinle Formation, Triassic Moenkopi Formation and Permian Organ Rock Formation. The structure is the surface expression of a deep fault along the east margin of the Monument Uplift.

== History ==
Traces of the Ancestral Puebloan culture can be found along the southern part of the ridge where it follows Chinle Wash. The Macomb and Hayden expeditions in 1869 and 1874–1876, respectively, were the first to publish maps and descriptions of this feature. The ridge and adjacent Butler Wash were given their current names in 1884, by P. Holmann.

Numerous cliff dwellings are found along the ridge.

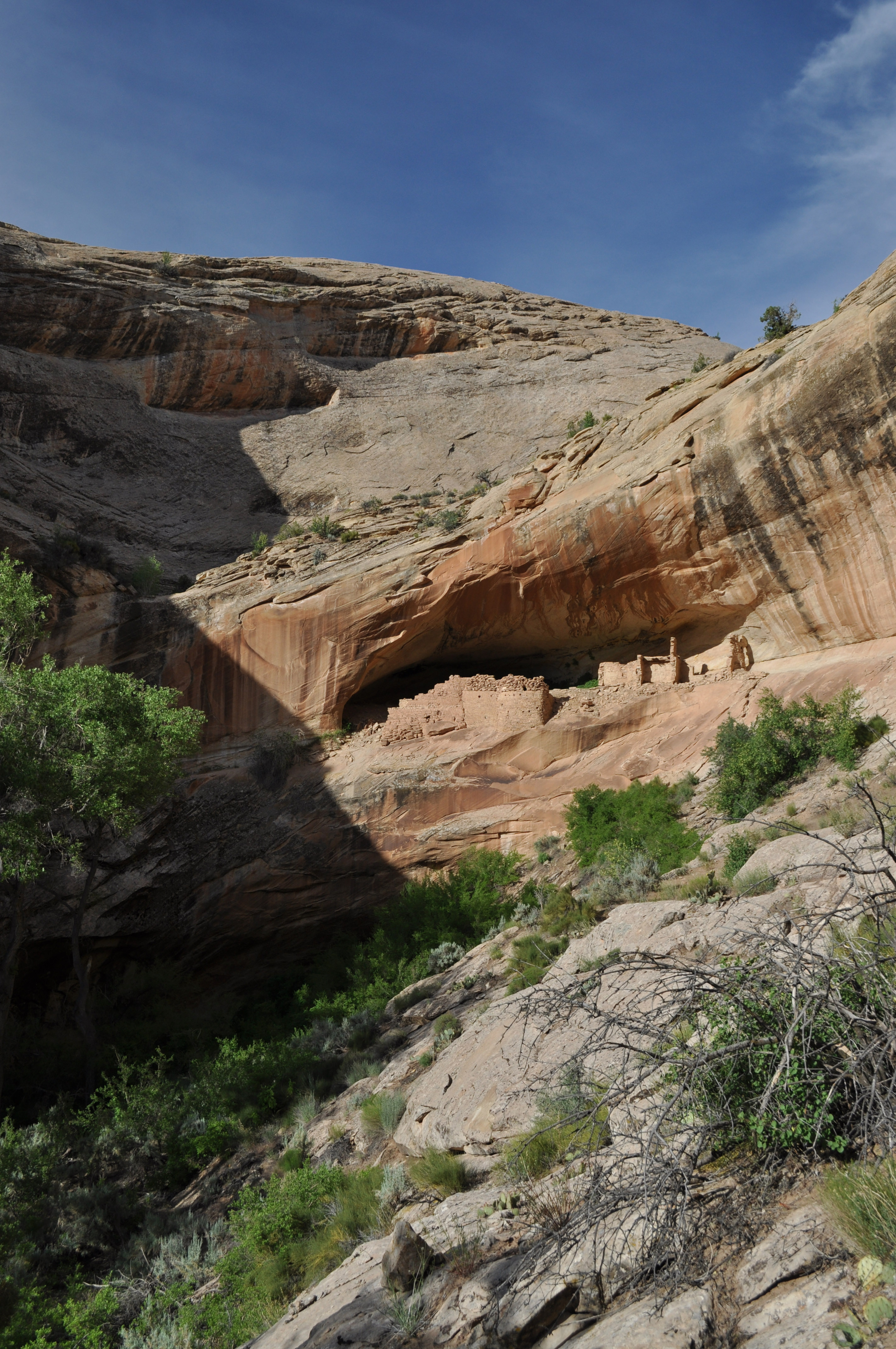
Monarch Cave Ruin cliff dwelling on Comb Ridge

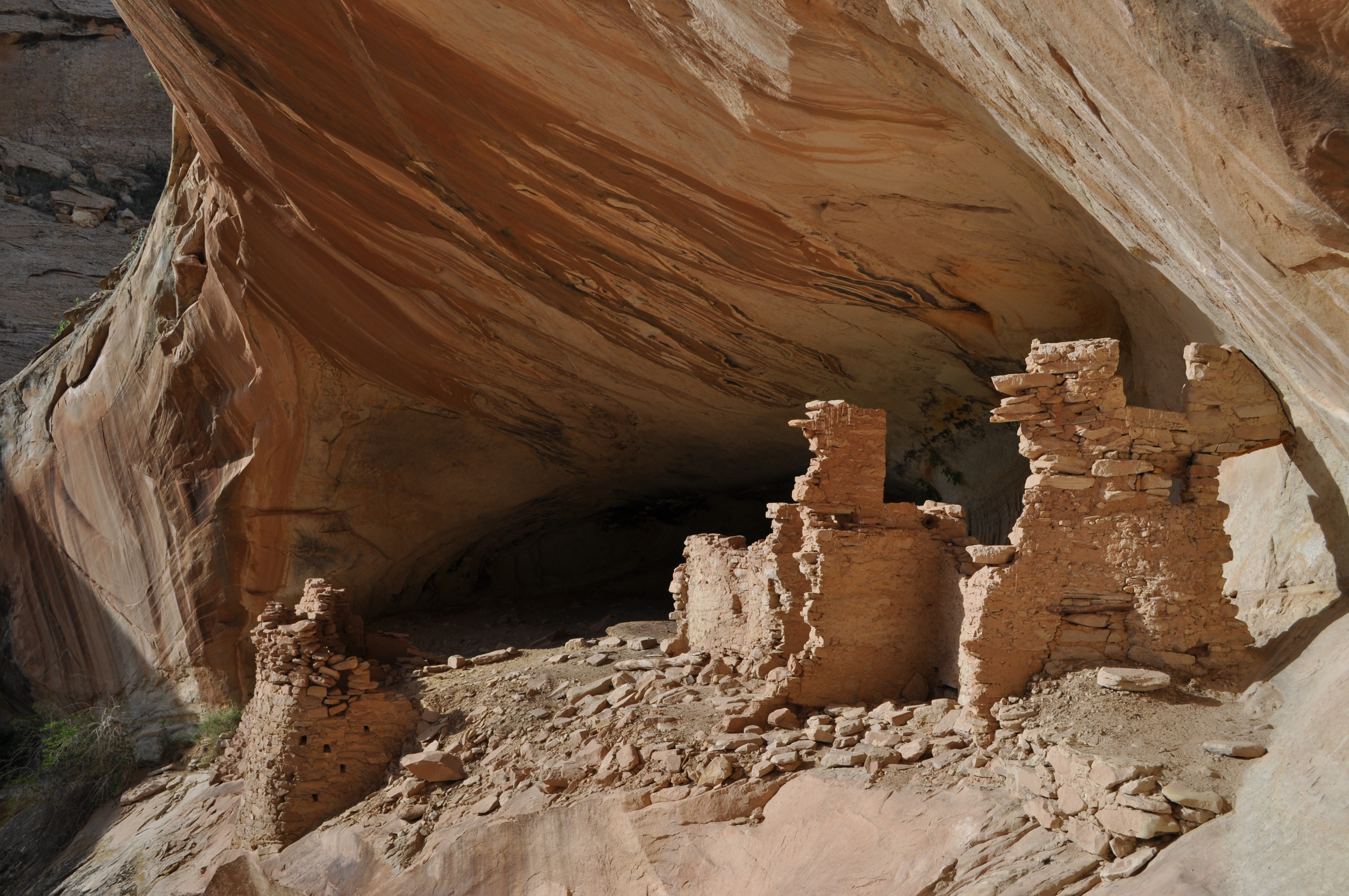
Monarch Cave Ruin cliff dwelling on Comb Ridge

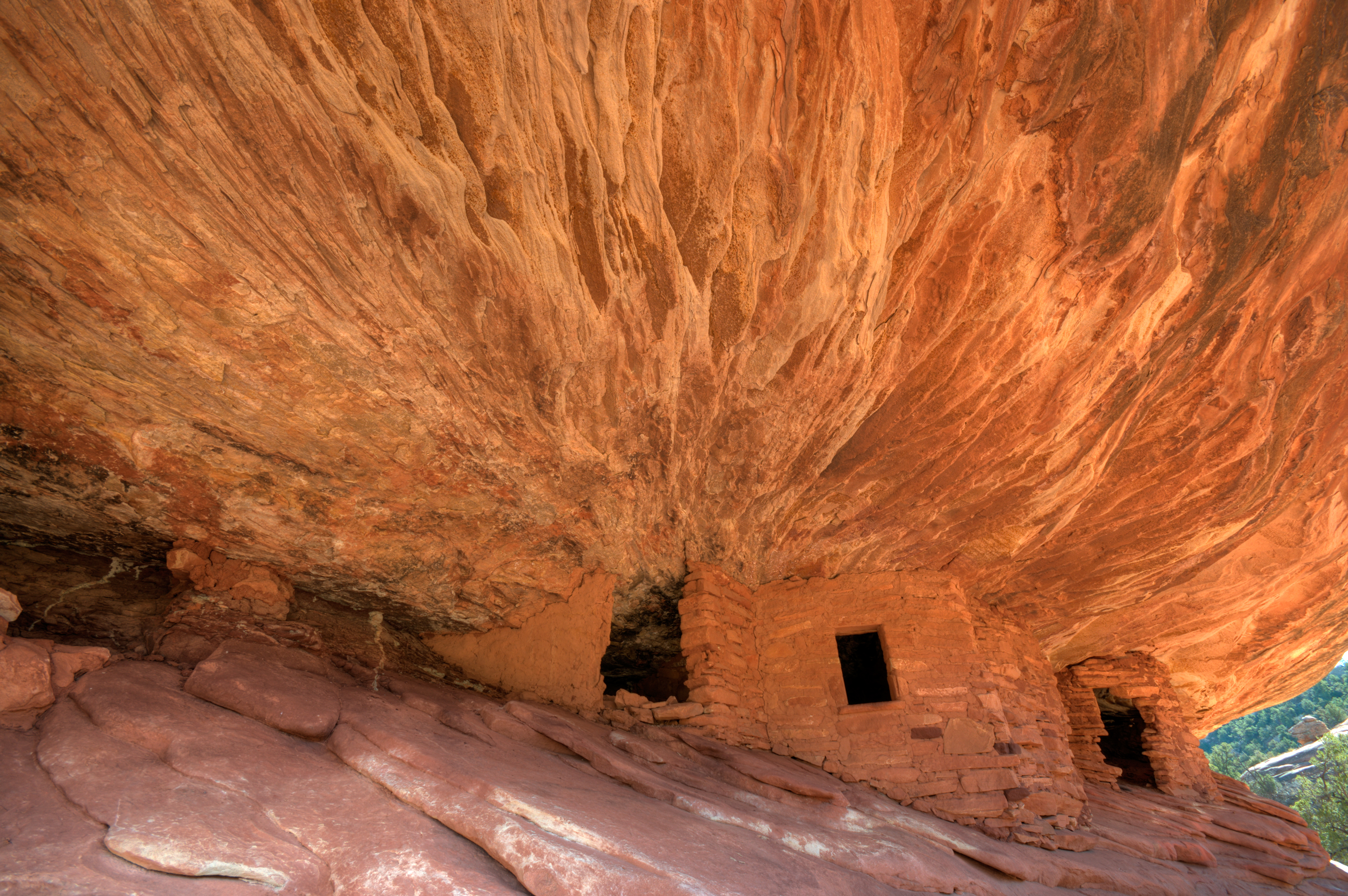
House on Fire Ruin near Comb Ridge

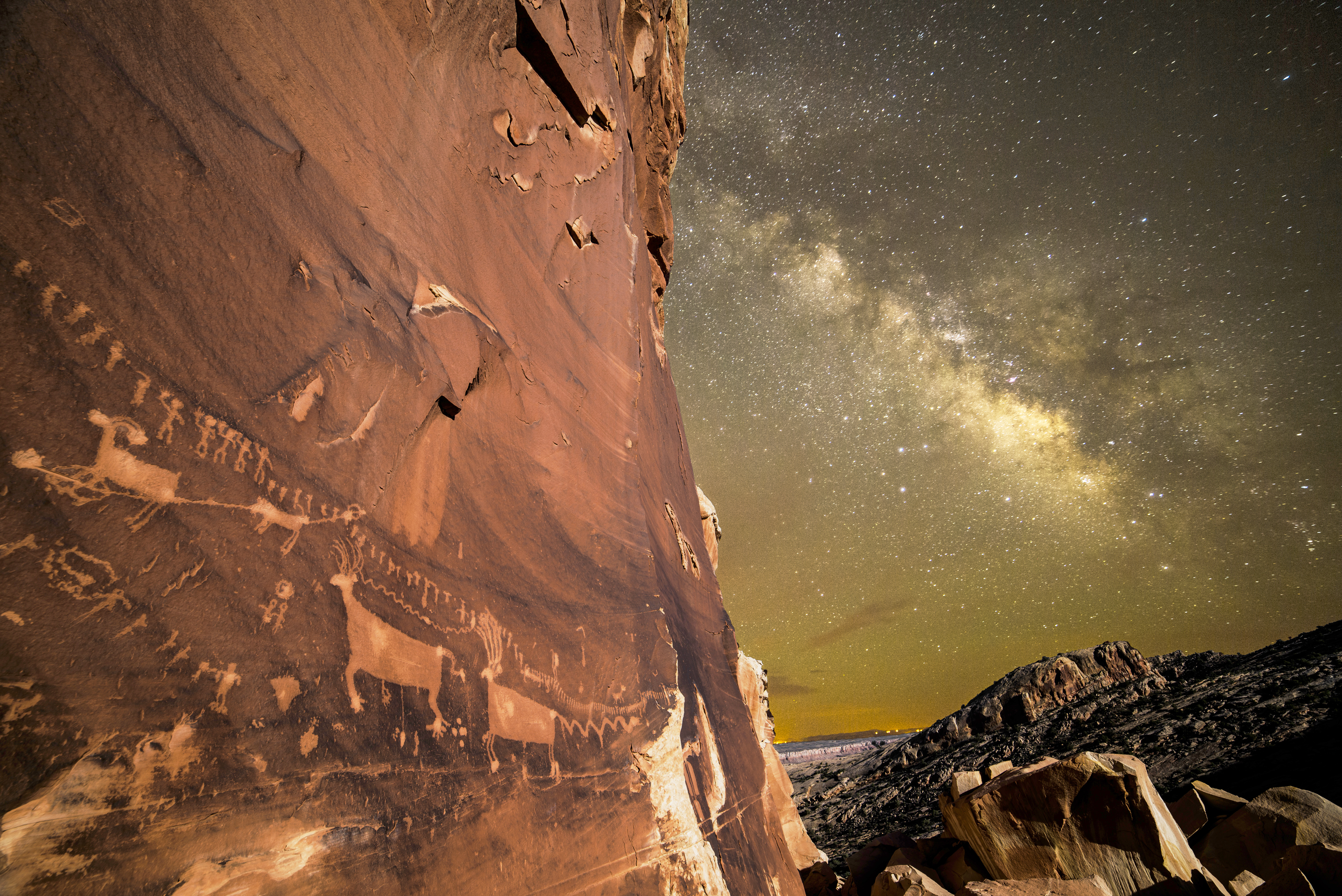
Procession Panel petroglyph

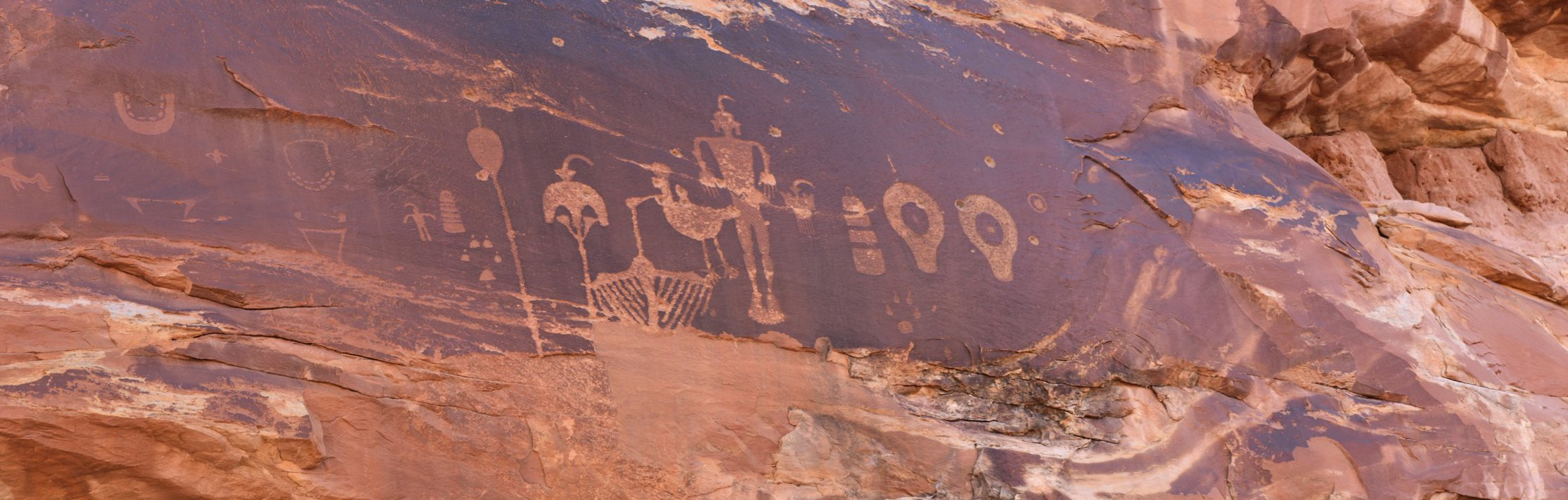
Wolfman Panel petroglyph

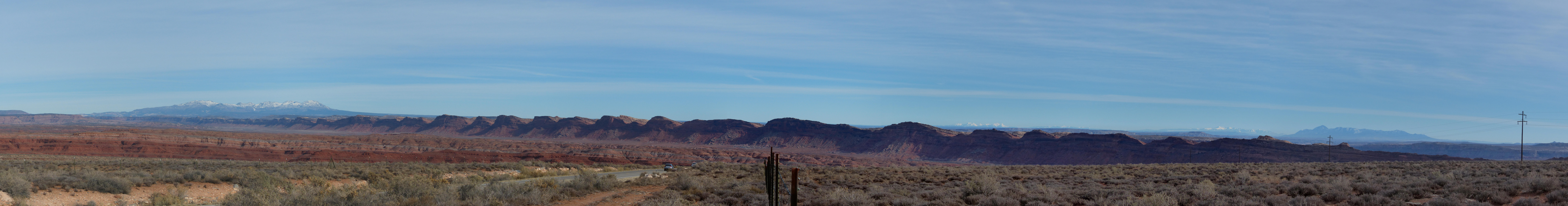
Panorama of Comb Ridge from U.S. Route 163

== See also ==
- Posey War
- Trail of the Ancients
- Anasazi State Park Museum
- Pueblo III Era
