= Escalante (Martian crater) =

Crater on Mars

Escalante Crater
- Escalante Crater Wall, as seen by HiRISE. Picture on left is enlargement of the one on right. Scale bar is long.
- Planet: Mars
- Coordinates: 0.2°N 244.7°W
- Quadrangle: Amenthes
- Eponym: Mexican astronomer F. Escalante

Escalante Crater is an impact crater in the Amenthes quadrangle of Mars. It is located at 0.2° N and 244.7° W. It is 79.3 km (49.3 mi) in diameter, and was named after Mexican astronomer (c. 1930) Francisco Javier Escalante Plancarte.

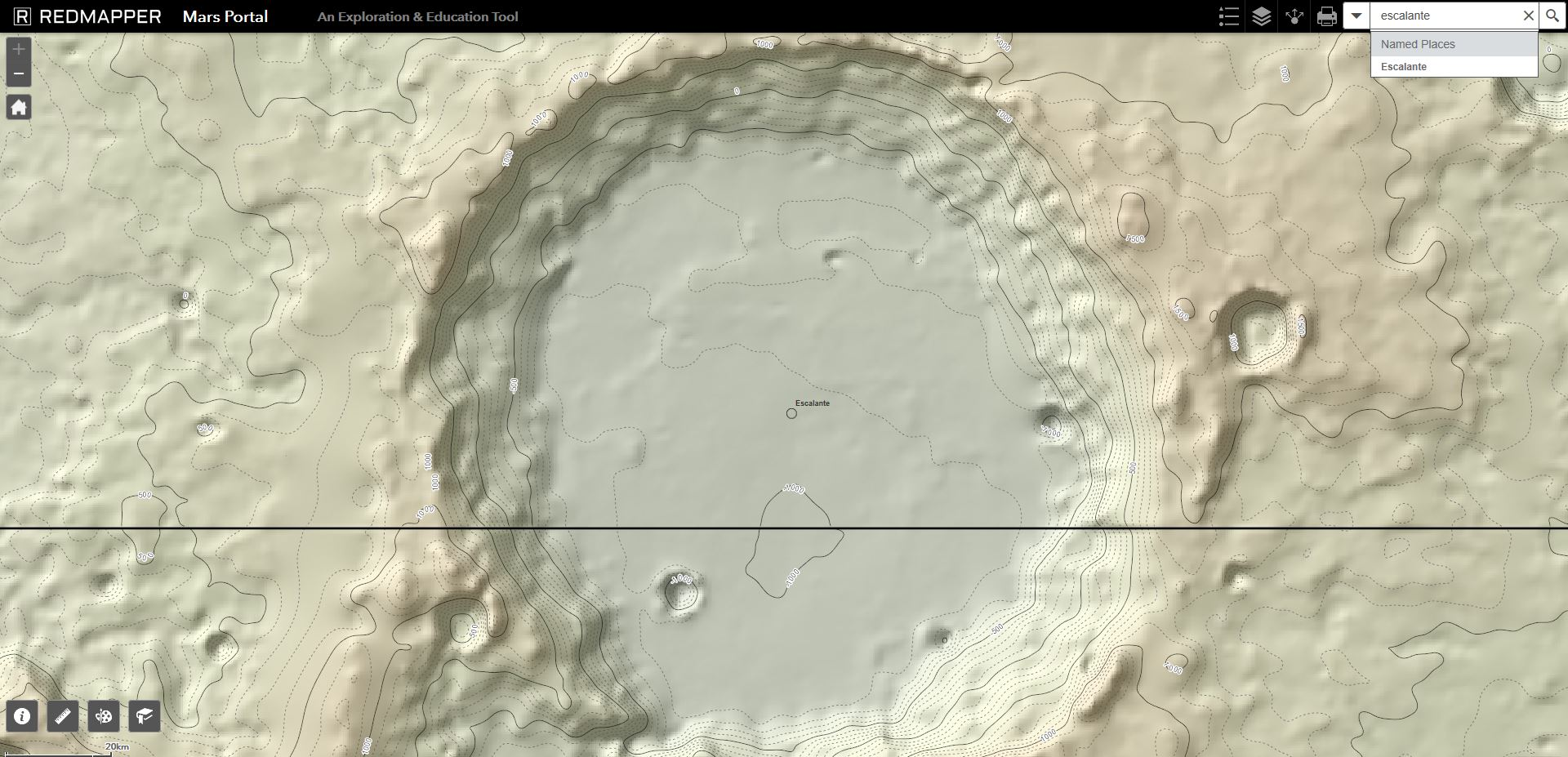
This topographic map was created using Mars Orbiter Laser Altimeter (MOLA) technology on the Mars Global Surveyor spacecraft. This image is a screenshot of RedMapper's website and shows the rim and center of Escalante crater

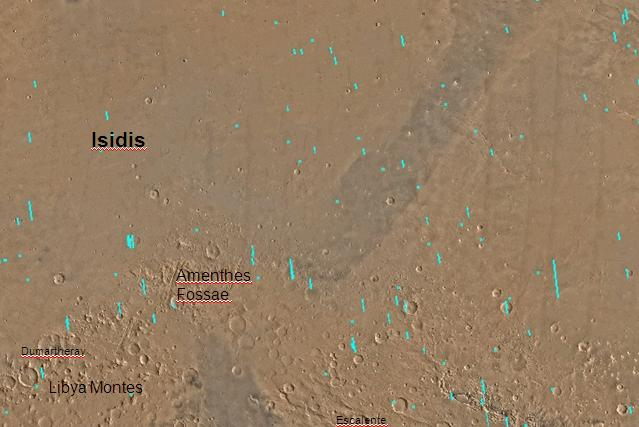
Map of Amenthes quadrangle. The northwest part is the large impact basin Isidis. The crater Escalante sits right on the equator.
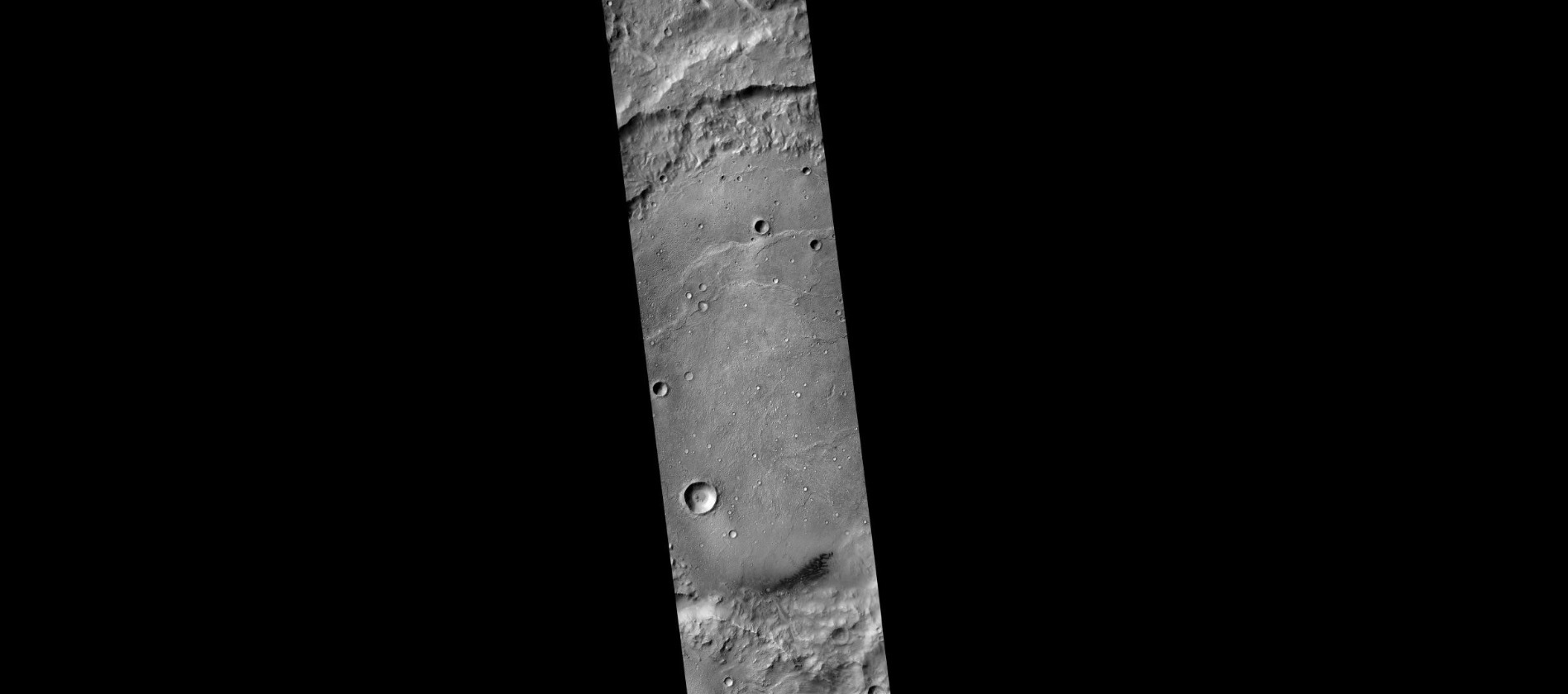
CTX camera (on Mars Reconnaissance Orbiter) image of Escalante Crater. Dunes are visible near the bottom of the image.

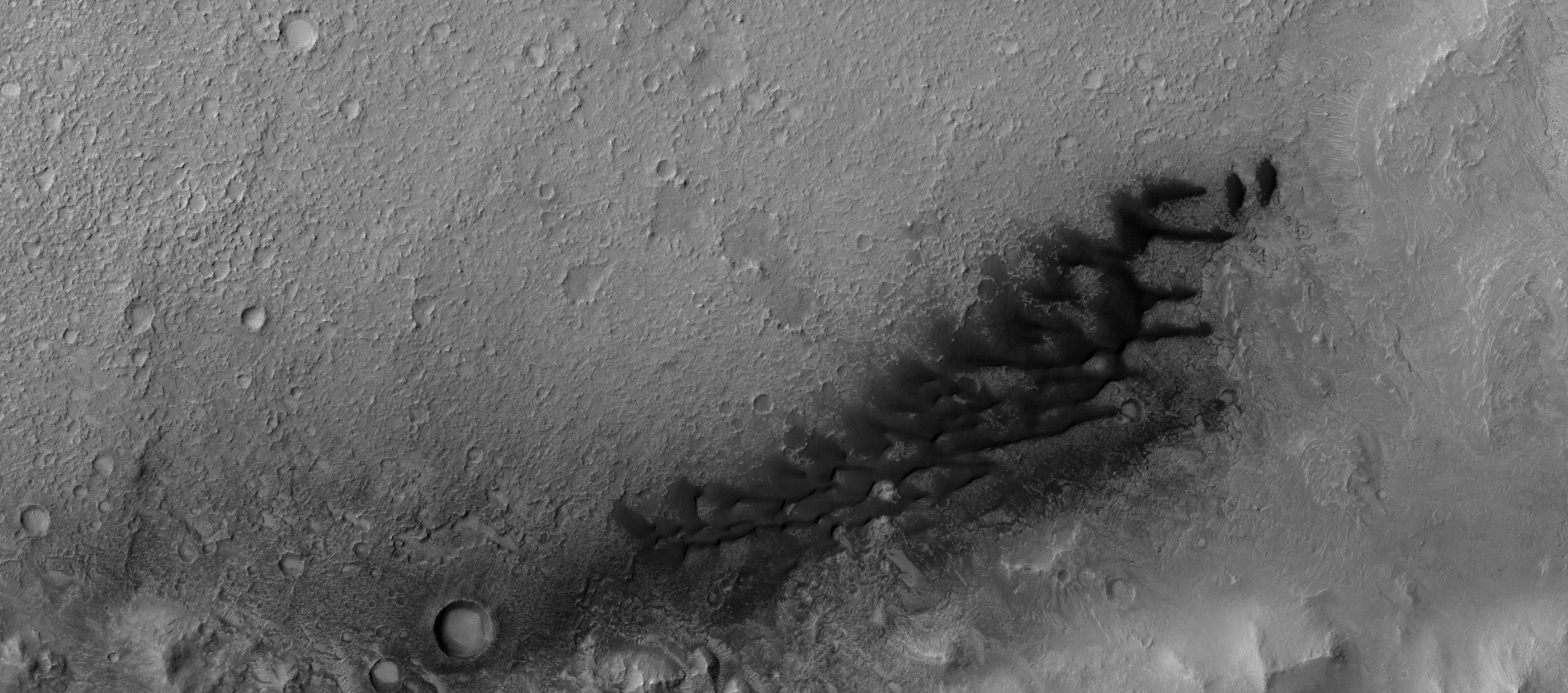
Enlargement of dunes in Escalante Crater from previous photo. Image taken with CTX camera (on Mars Reconnaissance Orbiter).

Impact craters generally have a rim with ejecta around them, in contrast volcanic craters usually do not have a rim or ejecta deposits. As craters get larger (greater than 10 km in diameter) they usually have a central peak. The peak is caused by a rebound of the crater floor following the impact. If one measures the diameter of a crater, the original depth can be estimated with various ratios. Because of this relationship, researchers have found that many Martian craters contain a great deal of material; much of it is believed to be ice deposited when the climate was different. Sometimes craters expose layers that were buried. Rocks from deep underground are tossed onto the surface. Hence, craters can show us what lies deep under the surface.

== See also ==
- Climate of Mars
- Impact crater
- Impact event
- List of craters on Mars
- Ore resources on Mars
- Planetary nomenclature
