= Dark Canyon Wilderness =

Wilderness area in Utah, United States

- IUCN category Ib (wilderness area)
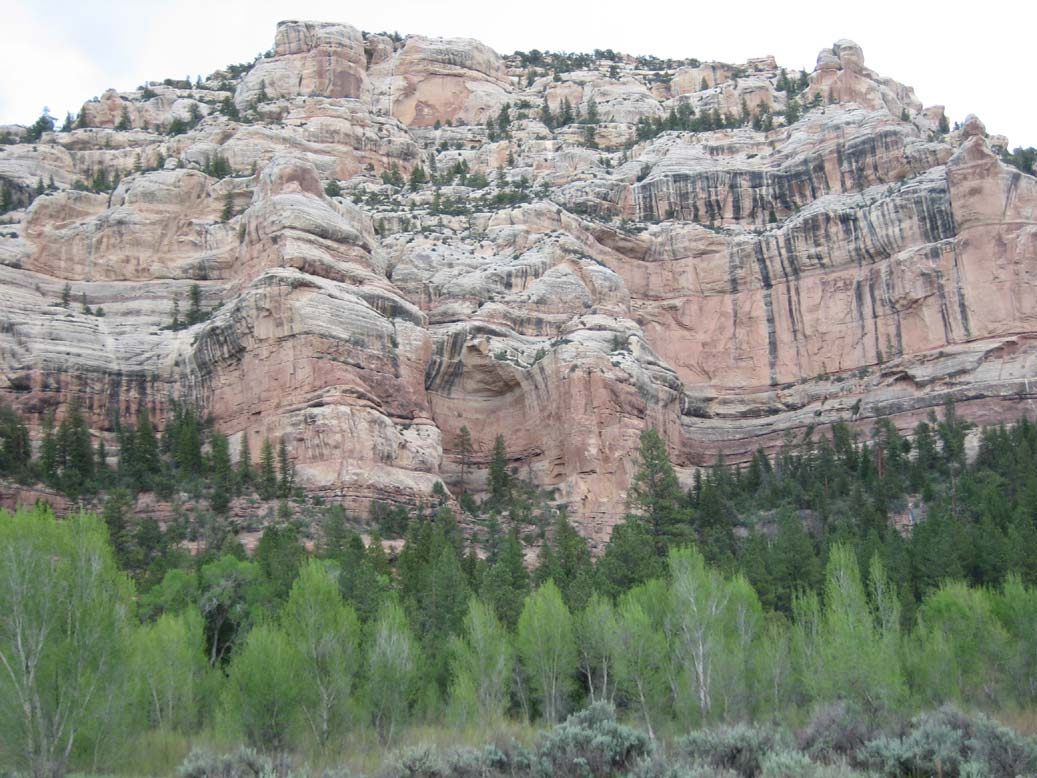

- Location within the United States Location within Utah
- Location: San Juan County, Utah, USA
- Nearest city: Monticello, Utah
- Coordinates: 37°46′35″N 109°53′51″W
- Area: 47,116 acres (73.619 mi^{2}; 190.67 km^{2})
- Established: September 18, 1984
- Governing body: U.S. Forest Service

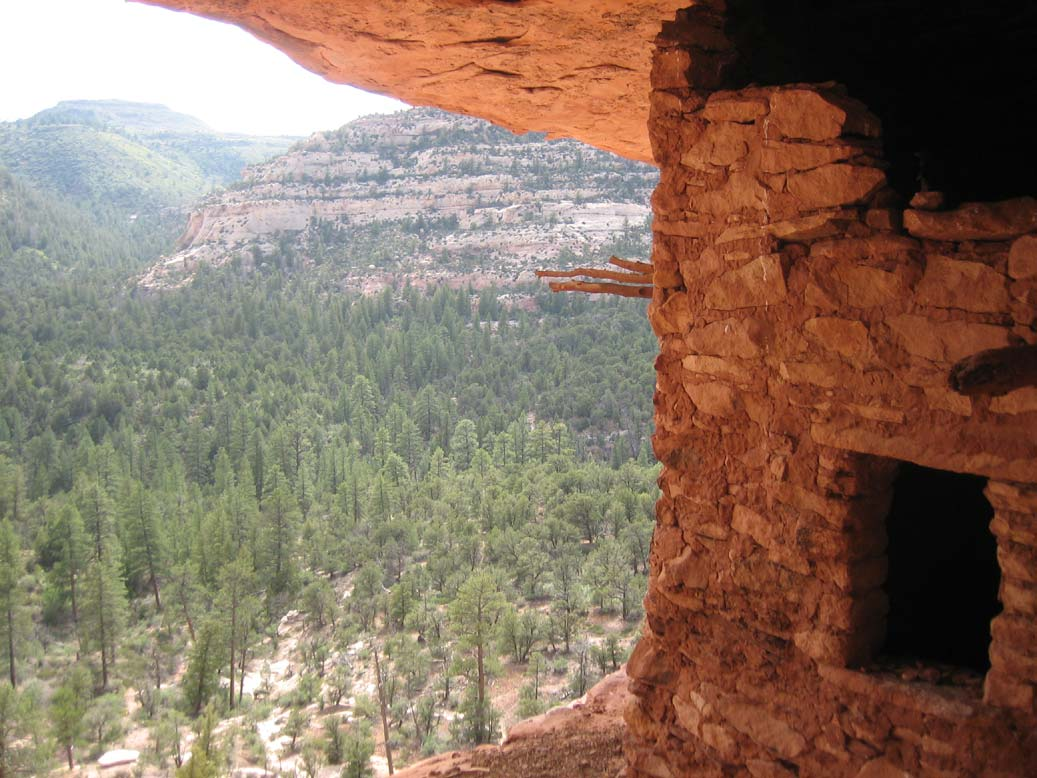
Ancestral Puebloan ruin in Dark Canyon Wilderness

Dark Canyon Wilderness is a designated Wilderness Area in the heart of southeast Utah's canyon country, part of the Bears Ears National Monument. The wilderness is named for its high steep walls that narrow in the lower section so that they block the light in the morning and late afternoon. The roughly horseshoe-shaped wilderness is made up of the upper part of 40-mile-long (64 km) Dark Canyon and two major tributaries, Woodenshoe Canyon and Peavine Canyon in the Manti-La Sal National Forest. These canyons all descend from pine-covered Elk Ridge northeast of Natural Bridges National Monument. Dark Canyon continues west within a U.S. Bureau of Land Management primitive area that is recommended for wilderness designation. The last four miles (6.4 km) of the main canyon drop steeply through Glen Canyon National Recreation Area into Lake Powell.

On December 28, 2016 President Barack Obama proclaimed the 1.35 million acre Bears Ears National Monument, that includes both the Dark Canyon Wilderness and the adjacent Dark Canyon Primitive Area.

Life zones range from ponderosa pine and aspen-covered high country to desert vegetation in the bottom of Dark Canyon. High terraced castle-like sandstone walls tower 3,000 feet (910 m) above the canyon floors. Wildlife species include mule deer, some mountain lions, black bear and bighorn sheep. This diverse canyon country contains arches, springs, seeps and hanging gardens.

Water sources in Dark Canyon are often widely separated, and some have dried up entirely in recent drought years. Thunderstorms can result in powerful flash floods that scour the canyon streambeds.

Wilderness visitors may see evidence of the Ancestral Puebloan culture, with several ruins of cliff dwellings in the region.

All the trails dropping into the canyons are moderate but they can be difficult, if not impossible, to find and follow until you reach the bottoms of the canyons. Peavine Canyon contains a cherry-stem jeep trail. The Forest Service once recommended closing the area to vehicles but this corridor was kept open as a compromise in the Utah Wilderness Act of 1984.

== See also ==
- National Wilderness Preservation System
- List of U.S. Wilderness Areas
- Wilderness Act
