= Murder Mountain =

Murder Mountain may refer to:

- "Murder Mountain", the nickname for the Rancho Sequoia area of Alderpoint, California
- Murder Mountain (TV series), a documentary series on Netflix

== See also ==
- Murder the Mountains, a 2011 album by Red Fang
