= Beatty Creek =

Beatty Creek may refer to:

- Beatty Creek (California) - a stream in Humboldt County, California, United States
- Beatty Creek (Tahltan River) - a stream in northwest British Columbia, Canada
- Beatty Creek (Washington) - a stream in Washington state, United States

== See also ==
- Beaty Creek - a stream in Arkansas and Oklahoma, United States
