= Eel River Canyon Preserve =

Nature preserve in Mendocino and Trinity counties, California

- IUCN category V (protected landscape/seascape)
- Location within California
- Interactive map of Eel River Canyon Preserve
- Location: Mendocino County, California and Trinity County, California
- Nearest city: Alderpoint, California
- Coordinates: 39°57′44″N 123°25′32″W
- Area: 26,600 acres (10,800 ha)
- Max. elevation: 4,000 ft (1,200 m)
- Min. elevation: 500 ft (150 m)
- Established: 2021
- Operator: The Wildlands Conservancy
- Website: Eel River Canyon Preserve

Eel River Canyon Preserve is a nature preserve that protects more than 18 miles (29 km) of the Eel River and 3 miles (4.8 km) of its North Fork, including their confluence. The 26,600 acres (10,800 ha) preserve is owned and managed by The Wildlands Conservancy as part of its system of preserves.

== Geography ==
The preserve spans elevations from 500 feet (150 m) to 4,000 feet (1,200 m), encompassing steep ridges, riparian corridors, and oak woodlands. It includes frontage along 18 miles (29 km) of the Eel River and 3 miles (4.8 km) of its North Fork at their confluence. Forests include Oregon white oak, buckeye, big leaf maple, madrone, Douglas fir, and ponderosa pine.

== Flora and fauna ==
Habitats include perennial wetlands, vernal pools, and river corridors. Wildlife documented in the preserve include salmon, steelhead, foothill yellow-legged frogs, Pacific pond turtles, fishers, ringtails, and two herds of Roosevelt elk.

== History ==
The property was long held by the Dean Witter family as part of Lone Pine Ranch. In 2019, The Wildlands Conservancy secured an option to acquire the ranch after purchasing the adjacent White Ranch, now Emerald Waters Reserve. The acquisition was completed in 2021, creating the Eel River Canyon Preserve with support from state agencies and partner organizations.

== Conservation ==
The preserve is part of the Eel River Emerald Necklace, a The Wildlands Conservancy initiative consisting of preserves along the Eel River. In a 2020 interview with the Northcoast Environmental Center, representatives of the conservancy discussed the preserve's role in the Emerald Necklace and its relationship to other preserves along the Eel River.

== Recreation ==
The preserve is not yet open to the general public. Future public access has been discussed in connection with trails, river access for paddlers, and the proposed Great Redwood Trail.

== Works ==
The preserve was featured in a 2024 episode of OpenRoad with Doug McConnell, which showcased the Great Redwood Trail and described the conservancy's plans for public access along the Eel River corridor.

== See also ==
- List of The Wildlands Conservancy preserves
- Spyrock Reserve
- Emerald Waters Reserve
