= Middle Fork Eel River =

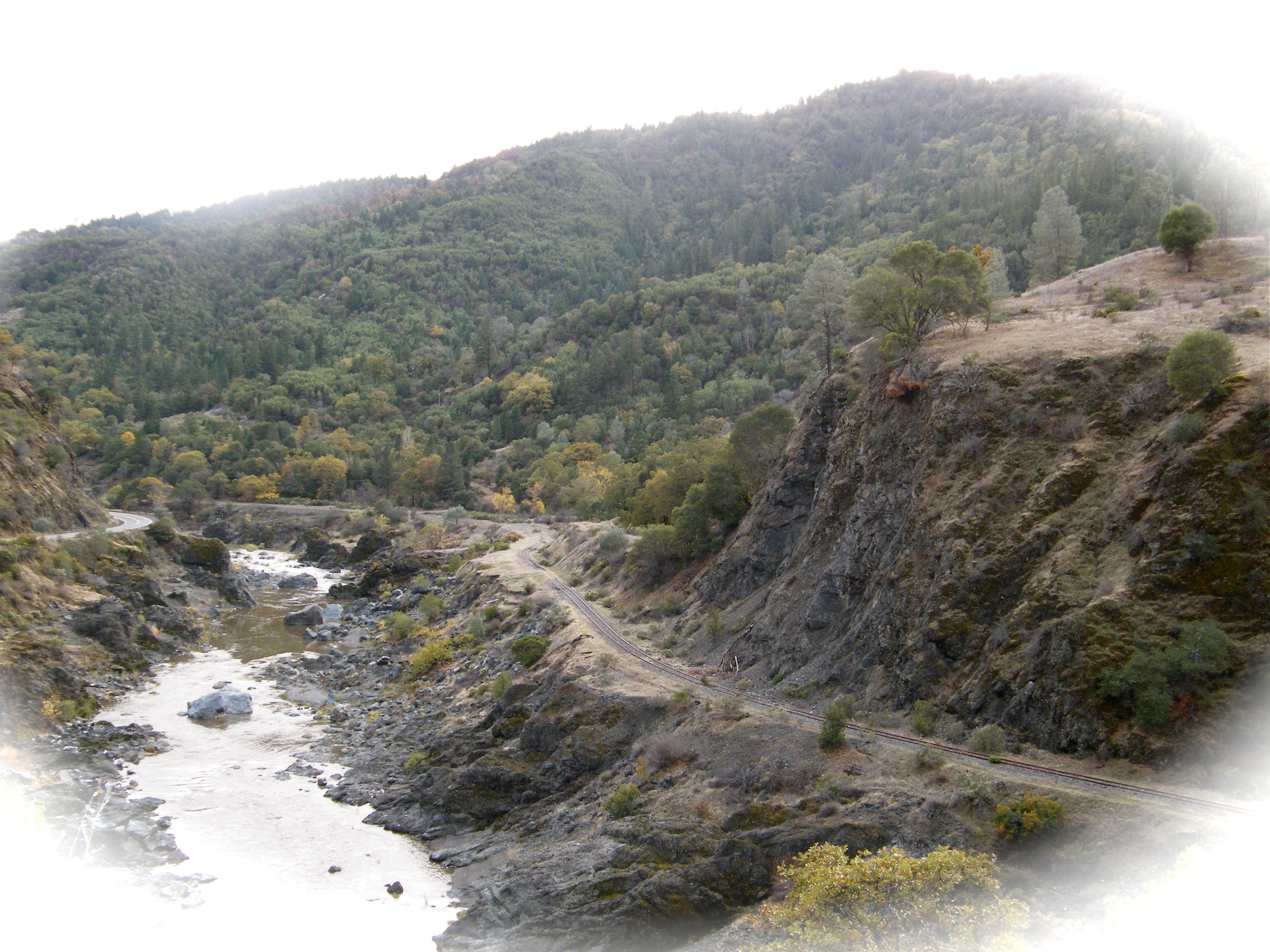
- Middle Fork Eel River near Round Valley, low water, 2008

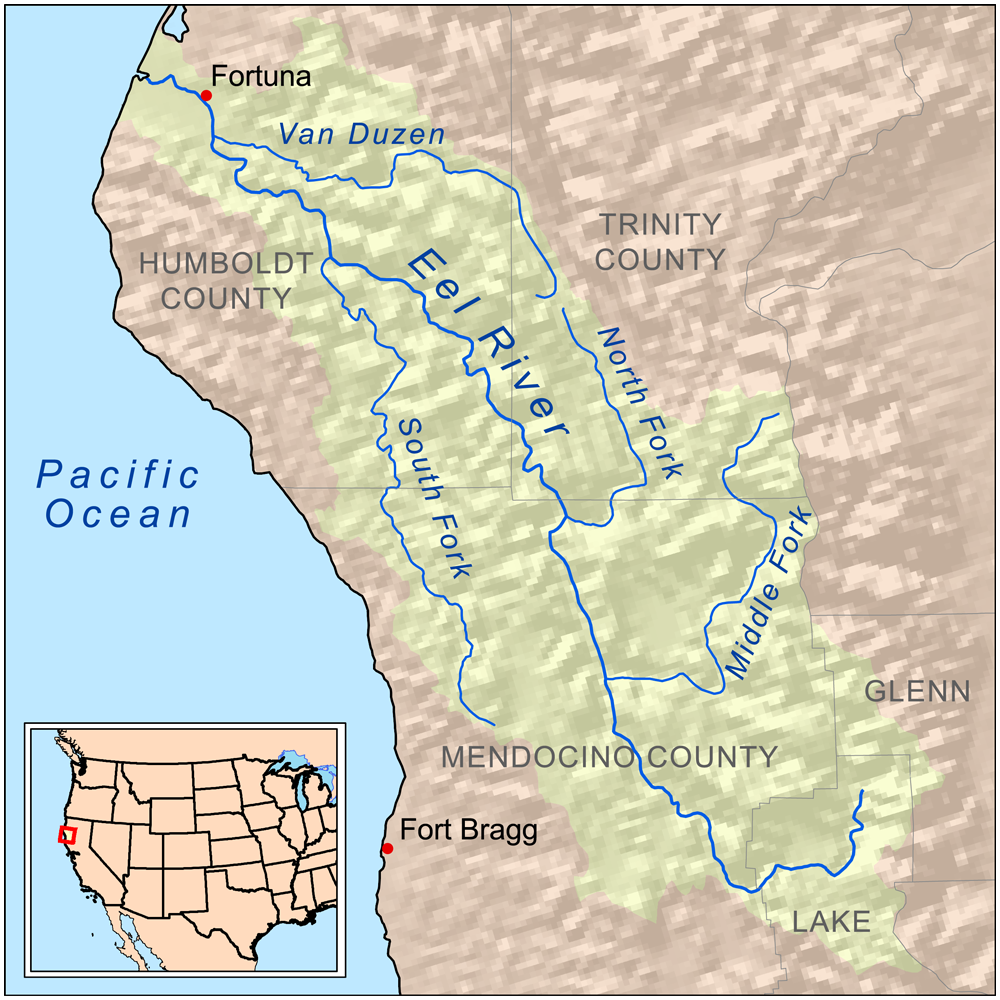
- Map of the Eel River drainage basin, including the Middle Fork Eel River
- Native name: Ba-ka-wha

Location
- Country: United States
- State: California
- Region: Trinity County, Mendocino County

Physical characteristics
- Source: Near Wrights Ridge
  - location: Yolla Bolly Mountains, Trinity County
  - coordinates: 40°04′52″N 122°58′57″W
  - elevation: 6,398 ft (1,950 m)
- Mouth: Eel River
  - location: Dos Rios, Mendocino County
  - coordinates: 39°42′50″N 123°21′10″W
  - elevation: 863 ft (263 m)
- Length: 69.8 mi (112.3 km), Northeast-southwest
- Basin size: 745 sq mi (1,930 km^{2})
- Discharge
  - location: Dos Rios, California
  - average: 1,472 cu ft/s (41.7 m^{3}/s)
  - minimum: 0.39 cu ft/s (0.011 m^{3}/s)
  - maximum: 135,000 cu ft/s (3,800 m^{3}/s)

Basin features
- River system: Eel River
- Tributaries
  - left: Black Butte River

National Wild and Scenic River
- Designated: January 19, 1981

The Middle Fork Eel River is a major tributary of the Eel River of northwestern California in the United States. It drains a rugged and sparsely populated region of the Yolla Bolly Mountains, part of the California Coast Range, in Trinity and Mendocino Counties. Its watershed comprises roughly 745 square miles (1,930 km^{2}) of land, or 20% of the entire Eel River basin. The river provides groundwater recharge and is used for recreation and for industrial, agricultural and municipal water supply by residents.

== Course ==
The Middle Fork Eel River flows almost 70 stream miles. It rises in the Yolla Bolly-Middle Eel Wilderness at the crest of the Coast Range about a mile or so north of Wrights Ridge and west of The Knob, at the confluence of several small unnamed streams. It makes a large bend to the south, then southeast past the confluence with Rattlesnake Creek (on the left) and the boundary between Trinity and Mendocino Counties. Turning south around Taliaferro Ridge at the Beaver Creek confluence, it then runs southwest to where the Black Butte River enters from the left. Williams Creek enters on the right, then the Middle Fork flows south through Round Valley Indian Reservation, passing within a few miles of Covelo before receiving Mill Creek from the right. Hayshed and Elk Creeks both enter from the left as the river rounds a bend to the north. Afterwards, the river's final miles are spent flowing westwards through a gorge to the confluence with the main stem near Dos Rios.

== Dam proposal ==
In 1967, the U.S. Army Corps of Engineers proposed to build an enormous dam just above the confluence of the Eel River and the Middle Fork Eel River at Dos Rios. The Dos Rios Dam would have been 730 feet (220 m) tall, creating a reservoir that covered 110,000 acres (450 km^{2}) of land (including Round Valley, the Middle Fork Eel River watershed's primary agricultural area and also the location of the town of Covelo, plus the Round Valley Indian Reservation). If built, this dam would have diverted most of the flow of the river into the Central Valley for irrigation purposes. The project was defeated by outcry from local residents and the intervention of then-California governor Ronald Reagan. Reagan remarked, "Enough treaties had already been broken with the Indians".

== Ecology ==
The river provides wildlife habitat for preservation of rare and endangered species including cold freshwater habitat for fish migration and spawning. In a 1965 California Fish and Wildlife Plan, the Middle Fork Eel River watershed supported an annual run of 23,000 Steelhead trout (Oncorhynchus mykiss) in 178 miles of stream habitat. Steelhead surveys were conducted by DFG and USFS from 1966 to 1999. In 1999 they described the Middle Fork summer steelhead run as “The largest remaining wild run of these magnificent fish”. It was noted to be “...probably the only population that has not been touched by a hatchery program, and as such, is most likely the State’s most important summer steelhead population”. Counts from the annual surveys indicated that the Middle Fork summer steelhead population has declined since 1987, to a count of 471 fish in 1999.

North American beaver (Castor canadensis) were once native to the watershed's Beaver Creek tributary as evidenced by an historical observer record: "Walter James, an old time hunter and trapper in this locality, is said to have caught beaver along what is now known as Beaver Creek in the late 1860s and early 1870s and there was a local belief that he did so. William and James Foster--uncles of Walter, who lives in Barney Meadows--said that during the 1870s they found remains of beaver dams and stumps of beaver-cut trees along the creek."

== See also ==
- North Fork Eel River
- South Fork Eel River
- List of rivers of California
- Yolla Bolly-Middle Eel Wilderness

== Works cited ==
- Reisner, Marc. Cadillac Desert, revised edition, Penguin USA, (1993), ISBN 0-14-017824-4
