= Blue goo =

Type of soil

Blue goo is a sticky, plasticky, blueish-grey, clay-textured soil derived from a highly weathered serpentinite mélange. The name derives from the soil's color; a result of undergoing anaerobic conditions and becoming gleyed. A greyer variation is called "grey goo". Blue goo is primarily found along the Northern California coast.

== Parent material ==
The Franciscan Complex is the bedrock from which blue goo is derived. It stretches along the coastline from Central California up to Southern Oregon and contains sheared materials from both the Pacific and North American Plates that have accumulated in the accretionary wedge.

The rock types that produce blue goo include: greenstones, cherts, basalts, shales, sandstones, schists, and serpenitites. These materials mixed together forming a "plum pudding" or a mélange. This mélange decomposed through weathering to form blue goo.

== Common features ==
Clay soils like blue goo have the highest water-holding capacity when compared with other soils, giving them a low draining capacity. This kind of habitat is unsuitable for most plants, but the Northern California coastline maintains high levels of vegetation year round.

Due to blue goo's clayey texture, it slips when overly saturated. This slippage is increased in heavy rainfall areas and in shallow soils; deep soils have more total pore space and are not as prone to slippage. These features contribute to the landslide-ridden environments found along the Northern Californian coast.

== Locations ==
The Franciscan Complex, from which blue goo is derived, extends from Central California up the coast through parts of Southern Oregon. But blue goo has only been found in two Northern Californian regions located in Humboldt County: the Trinidad region and the Orick region. Blue goo is thought to also be found in the Eel River region and along the Southern Oregon coastline.
