= Frank Cieciorka =

American painter

- Born: Frank Cieciorka upstate New York
- Died: Alderpoint, California
- Education: San Jose State
- Known for: Graphic Arts
- Notable work: "The Fist"
- Movement: Civil Rights
- Spouse: Bobbi Cieciorka/Karen Horn

Frank Cieciorka (April 26, 1939 – November 24, 2008) was an American graphic artist, painter, and activist. His best known work, a woodcut rendering of a clenched-fist salute, was a model for the New Left emblem.

Cieciorka (che-CHOR-ka) grew up in Johnson City upstate New York. In 1957, he attended San Jose State College in California, where he joined the Socialist Party out of opposition to American military intervention in the Dominican Republic and Vietnam. In 1964, he was a volunteer organizer during the Freedom Summer drive to register black voters in Mississippi and served as field secretary for the Student Nonviolent Coordinating Committee, experiences which shaped his political consciousness. Cieciorka also helped organize the Mississippi Freedom Democratic Party, an alternative to the official white-dominated state Democratic Party.

Examples of the fist in political art can be found as far back in 1917, on an Industrial Workers of the World poster, but Cieciorka pioneered its modern usage. Having seen the clenched-fist salute at a Socialist rally in San Francisco, he decided it was a natural image for a woodcut. It gained widespread popularity when Cieciorka and others put the design on a button and gave out thousands at political rallies and demonstrations. In particular, the fist for the 1967 Stop the Draft Week became what art archivist and historian Lincoln Cushing considered "the iconic New Left fist — very stylized and easy to reproduce, picked up almost immediately by Students for a Democratic Society and others." Although the Black Panther Party used as its primary logo a panther designed by Emory Douglas, versions of Mr. Cieciorka's "power salute" also were featured in its publications.

Cieciorka's other work includes the book "Negroes in American History: A Freedom Primer," which he wrote and illustrated with Bobbi Dearborn Cieciorka who also graduated from San Jose State. The book was used in "freedom schools" throughout the American South during the fight for civil rights. Its cover shows four hands and one fist reaching for the sky and is possibly the first use of the fist in the civil rights movement. He drew poster art for labor groups including the United Farm Workers and other labor groups, made contributions to the Peoples Press Cooperative and was art director for The Movement newspaper.

In the early 1970s he moved to Humboldt County, California and became a noted watercolor painter particularly of landscapes of his rural California home. He died at his home in Alderpoint, California from emphysema on November 24, 2008.

== In collection ==
- Illustration for The Movement, San Francisco Bay Area, 1968; artist, Frank Cieciorka; H.K. Yuen Archive, University of California Berkeley.
