= Dos Rios, California =

Unincorporated community in California, United States

Dos Rios
- Unincorporated community
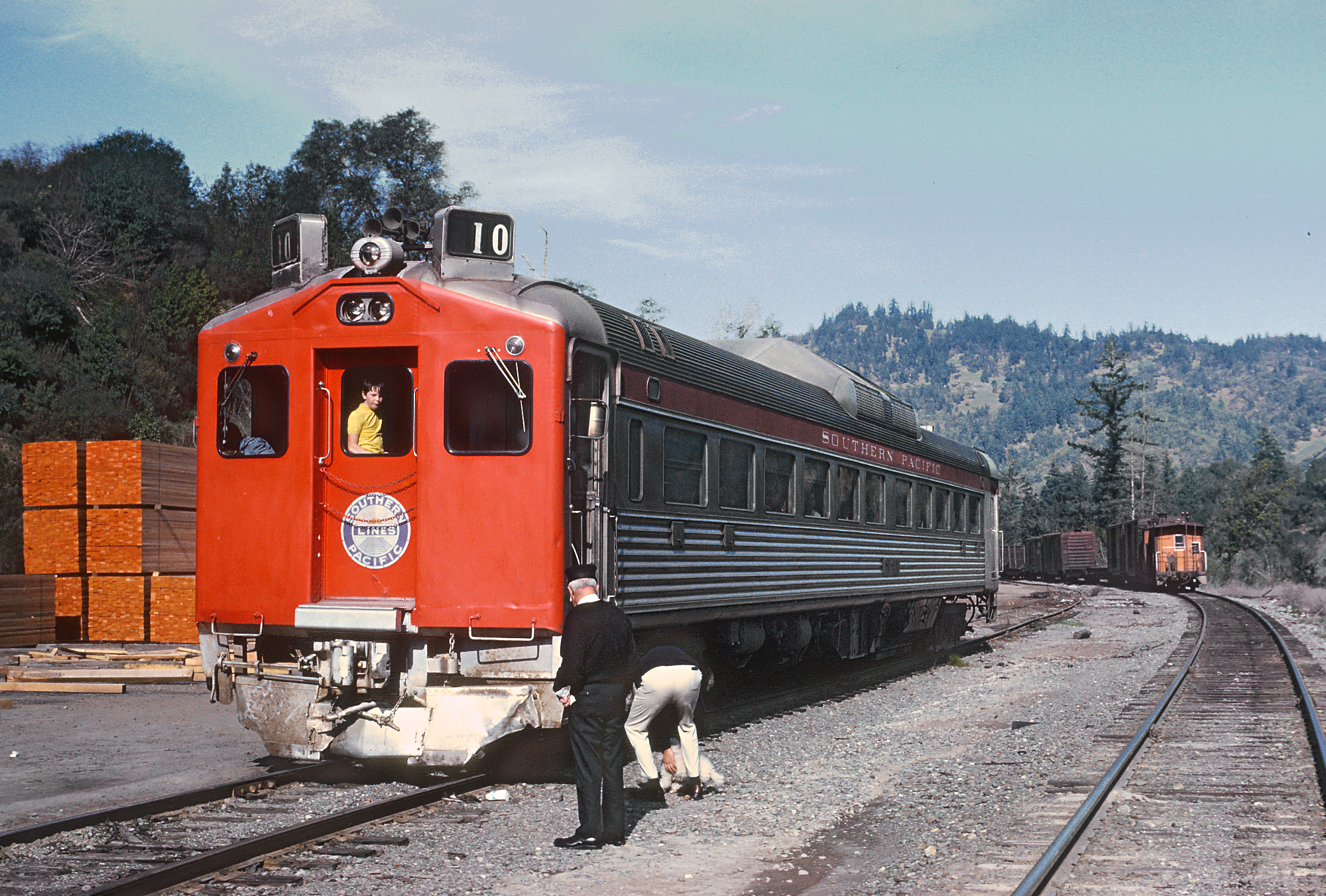
- Northwestern Pacific Railroad train at Dos Rios in 1971

- Location in California Dos Rios (the United States)
- Coordinates: 39°43′01″N 123°21′12″W
- Country: United States
- State: California
- County: Mendocino
- Elevation: 961 ft (293 m)
- ZIP code: 95429

Dos Rios (Spanish for "Two Rivers") is an unincorporated community in Mendocino County, California, United States. It is located 7 miles (11 km) east-northeast of Laytonville, at an elevation of 961 feet (293 m). Dos Rios' ZIP code, 95429, has a population of 70. The Dos Rios AVA is located in the area.

The Two Rivers post office opened in 1912 and changed its name to Dos Rios in 1915. The name comes from the place's proximity to the confluence of the Middle Fork of the Eel River with the Eel River proper. Dos Rios was served by Northwestern Pacific Railroad passenger service until 1971.

== Climate ==
This region experiences very hot and dry summers, with highs recently near 115 °F (46 °C) in midsummer. According to the Köppen Climate Classification system, Dos Rios has a warm-summer Mediterranean climate, abbreviated Csb on climate maps.
