= North Fork Eel River =

River in California, United States

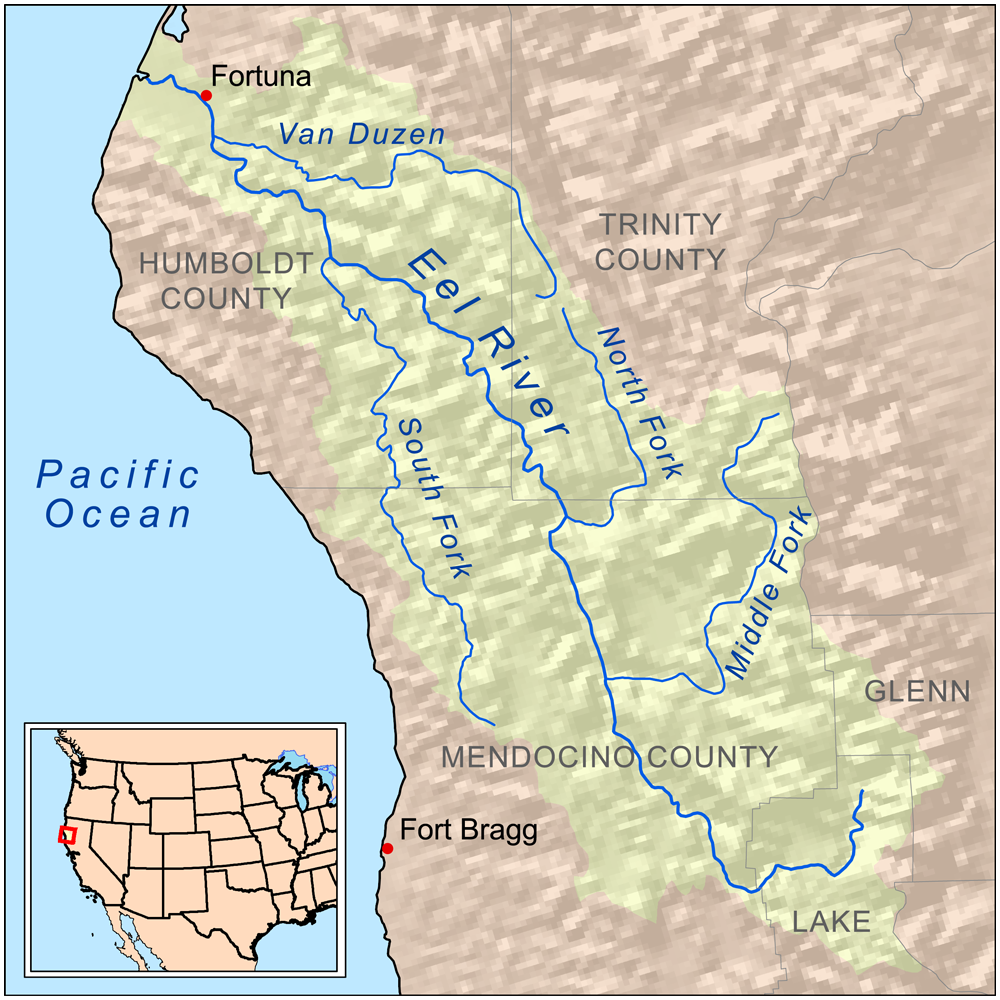
- Map of the Eel River drainage basin, including the North Fork Eel River

Location
- Country: United States
- State: California
- Region: Trinity County, Mendocino County

Physical characteristics
- Source: Confluence of East and West Forks
  - location: Six Rivers National Forest, Trinity County
  - coordinates: 40°12′49″N 123°23′14″W
  - elevation: 2,123 ft (647 m)
- Mouth: Eel River
  - location: About 6 miles (9.7 km) north of Spyrock, Mendocino County
  - coordinates: 39°57′24″N 123°26′14″W
  - elevation: 574 ft (175 m)
- Length: 35.5 mi (57.1 km)
- Basin size: 286 sq mi (740 km^{2})
- Discharge
  - location: Mina, CA
  - average: 644 cu ft/s (18.2 m^{3}/s)
  - minimum: 0.13 cu ft/s (0.0037 m^{3}/s)
  - maximum: 133,000 cu ft/s (3,800 m^{3}/s)

Basin features
- River system: Eel River
- Tributaries
  - left: Red Mountain Creek, Hulls Creek
  - right: Wilson Creek

National Wild and Scenic River
- Designated: January 19, 1981

The North Fork Eel River is the smallest of four major tributaries of the Eel River in northwestern California in the United States. It drains a rugged wilderness area of about 286 square miles (740 km^{2}) in the California Coast Ranges, and flows through national forests for much of its length. Very few people inhabit the relatively pristine watershed of the river; there are no operational stream gauges and only one bridge (Mina Road) that crosses the river, near the boundary between Trinity and Mendocino Counties.

== Course ==
It is formed in southern Trinity County deep within the Six Rivers National Forest by the confluence of its East and West Forks. The East Fork, the larger of the two, is sometimes considered the main stem. The river flows south-southeast through the North Fork Wilderness of the national forest, receiving Red Mountain and Hulls Creeks, both from the left. After the Hulls Creek confluence it turns west then south through a gorge into Mendocino County. A few miles after crossing the county line, the river again swings west and flows into the Eel River about 6 miles (9.7 km) north of Spyrock.

== Watershed ==
Primary human usage of the basin include very limited farming, ranching, grazing and logging. A study conducted in 1996 reported that the North Fork Eel River basin has only 200 full-time residents. About 50 percent of the land is government-owned, 48% are private, and 2% belongs to the Round Valley Indian Reservation. Recreational uses, such as hunting and boating, are more common. For rafting, the North Fork Eel River is considered a very "difficult" river, shallow and fluctuating highly in flow, with Class IV and III rapids decreasing in size closer to the mouth.

== Ecology ==
The river historically was abundant with steelhead trout, and supported two distinct runs, one in the winter and one in the spring. The total historic population was estimated at 6,930 fish. Coho salmon might also have been present. However, logging and resultant severe erosion caused by the storms in 1964 caused hillsides to slump into the river near the mouth, filling its channel with debris and large boulders. The heavy flows also created several waterfalls that pose barriers to migrating fish, and the average temperature of the river was raised, reducing habitat quality.

== Wilderness ==
Established in 1984, the North Fork Wilderness comprises 8,158 acres and is managed by the U.S. Forest Service. This wilderness area encompasses the entire watershed of the North Fork Eel River. Centered around a mixed conifer lined gorge, the area is home to a significant population of black-tailed deer.

== See also ==
- Middle Fork Eel River
- South Fork Eel River
- List of rivers of California
- List of U.S. Wilderness Areas
