= Great Redwood Trail =

Multi-use rail-to-trail project in California

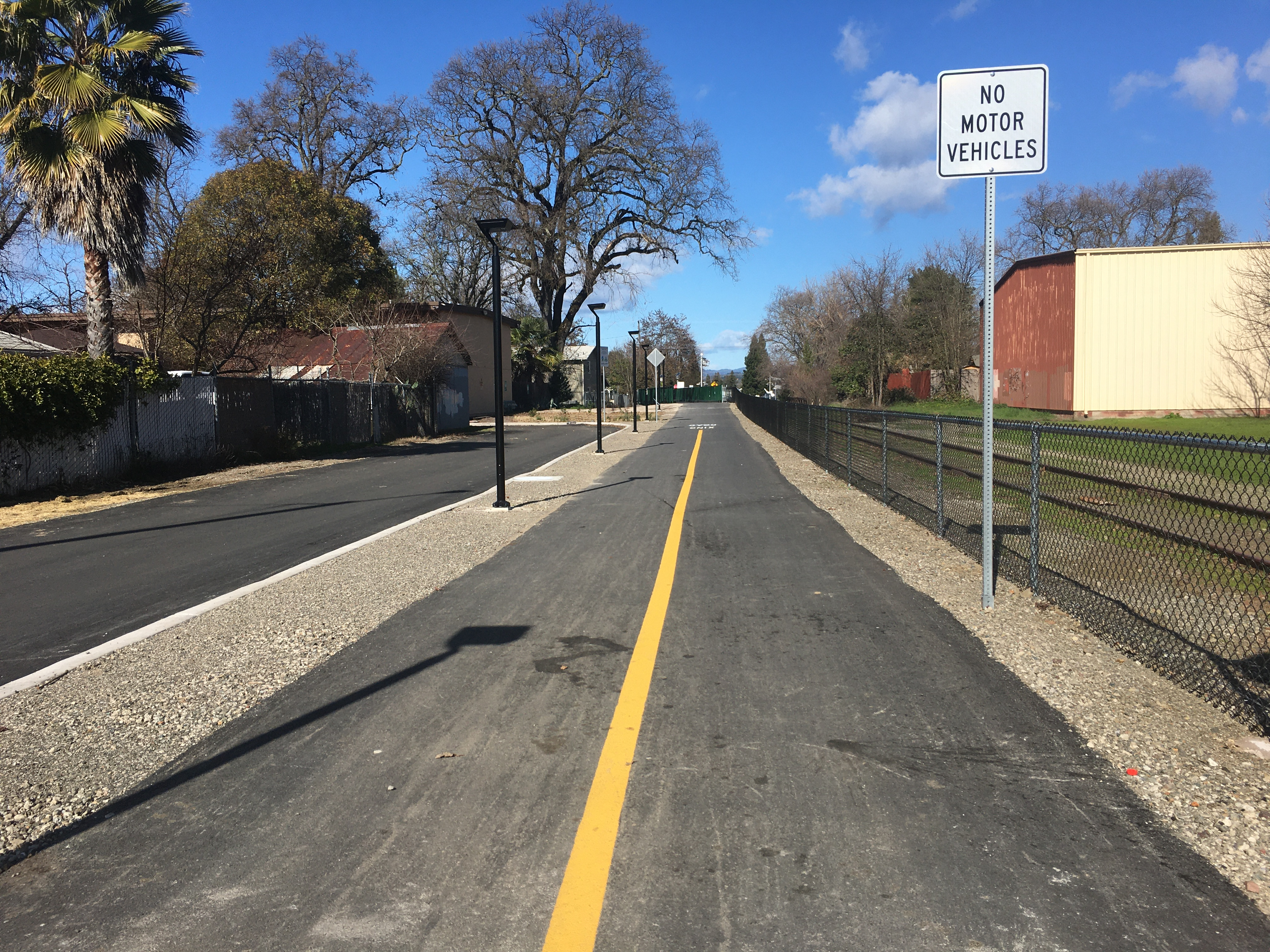
- Ukiah portion of Great Redwood Trail in 2020
- Length: 320 miles (510 km) (proposed)
- Use: cycling, pedestrians, equestrians
- Right of way: Northwestern Pacific Railroad, Sonoma–Marin Area Rail Transit
- Website: Official website

The Great Redwood Trail is a proposed multi-use rail-to-trail project connecting San Francisco and Humboldt bays in Northern California. Most of the trail will be built on the rail bed of the defunct Northwestern Pacific Railroad along the Eel River Canyon by the Great Redwood Trail Agency. The southern portion will be built by Sonoma–Marin Area Rail Transit (SMART) along their commuter rail line. The trail route is within 5 counties, 14 cities and the historic territory of many tribes. Some portions have already constructed by local jurisdictions with more being developed in cooperation with local governments.

The Great Redwood Trail Agency was established in March 2022. The agency took over management of the railroad corridor from the North Coast Railroad Authority to begin preparing a master plan to develop the trail. The California Coastal Conservancy is providing staff for the agency since they have decades experience with the California Coastal Trail. Situated in Marin, Sonoma, Mendocino, Trinity, and Humboldt Counties, the route passes through the cities of Novato, Petaluma, Rohnert Park, Santa Rosa, Windsor, Healdsburg, Cloverdale, Ukiah, Willits, Fortuna, Rio Dell, Eureka, Arcata, and Blue Lake.

The trail will pass through the Eel River Canyon Preserve, a property owned and managed by The Wildlands Conservancy. The trail alignment through the Eel River will be challenging due to erosive geology and some failing infrastructure, including tunnels, bridges, and trestles. In 2024, the California Coastal Conservancy authorized funding for a planning project led by The Wildlands Conservancy to support development of an approximately 11-mile segment of the trail along the Eel River in Trinity and Humboldt counties.

The first completed segment of the trail was celebrated by State Senator Mike McGuire in Ukiah in February 2020. The city approved the construction of the final trail segment for the entire 3-mile length (4.8 km) within the city in September 2021. A section in the city of Willits is being planned.

The project also has to deal with private property owners on either side of the trail right-of-way. Two or three years of public meetings will be held before the master plan is released. The Wailaki tribe has voiced opposition to the trail.

The project was featured in a 2024 episode of OpenRoad with Doug McConnell, which examined northern segments of the proposed trail, including both urban areas near Humboldt Bay and remote stretches along the Eel River.

== In Sonoma and Marin Counties ==
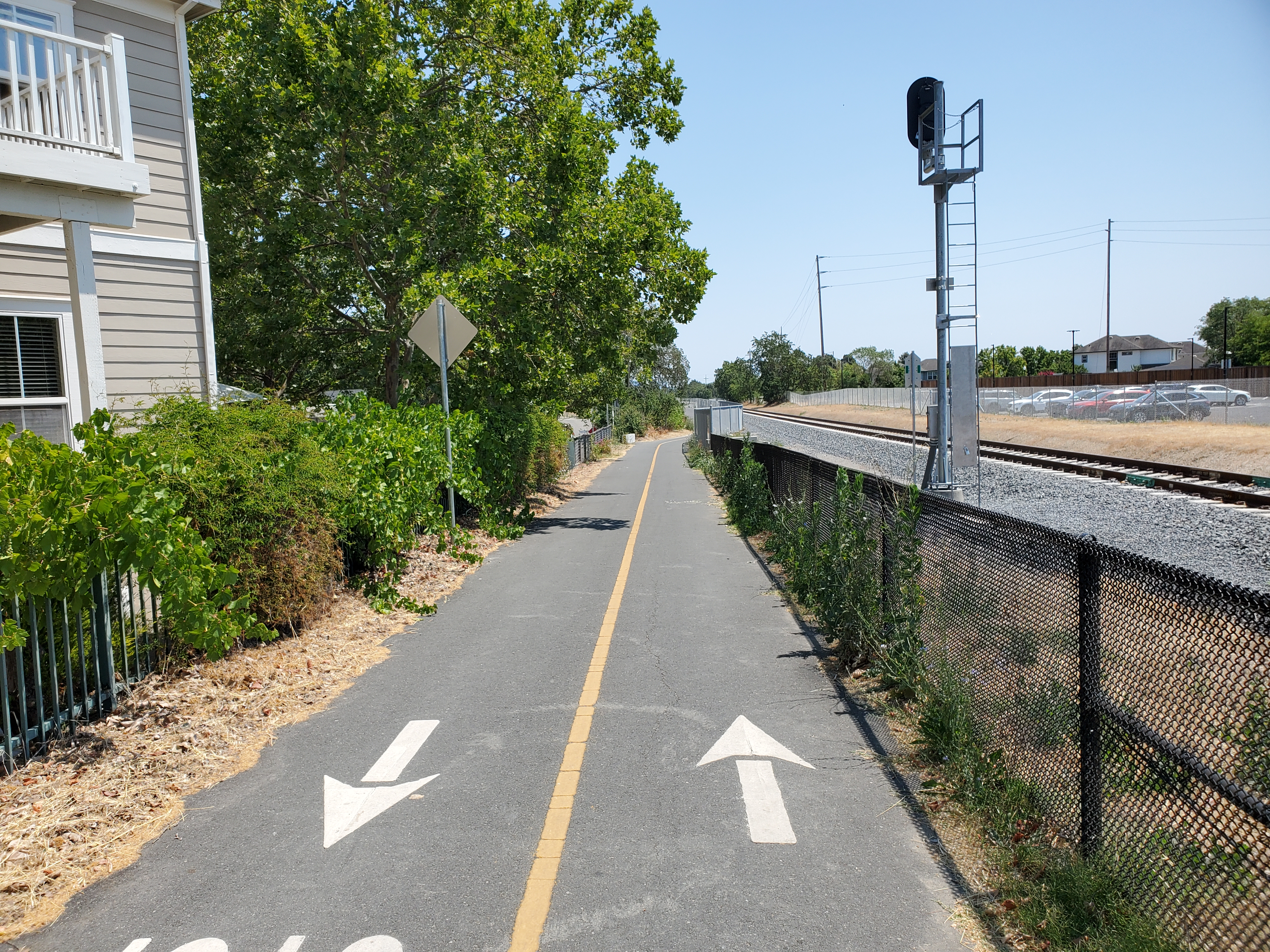
The SMART Pathway near Windsor in 2025

The original expenditure plan allocated $90 million for a parallel bicycle/pedestrian path. Due to financial constraints, SMART redirected pathway construction to bridge gaps between existing paths and provide station access. By early 2019, 16.2 miles (26.1 km) of the pathway had been completed in partnership with local jurisdictions.
