= Michael Bear Carson and Suzan Carson =

American serial killer duo

Michael Bear Carson
- Born: James Clifford Carson; November 28, 1950 (age 75)
- Other name: Michael Bear Carson
- Conviction: Murder
- Penalty: 75 years to life

Details
- Victims: 3+
- Span of crimes: 1981–1983
- Country: United States
- State: California
- Date apprehended: 1983

Suzan Carson
- Born: Susan Barnes; September 14, 1941 (age 85)
- Conviction: Murder
- Penalty: 75 years to life

Details
- Victims: 3+
- Span of crimes: 1981–1983
- Country: United States
- State: California
- Date apprehended: 1983

James Clifford Carson (a.k.a. Michael Bear Carson; born 1950) and Susan Barnes Carson (aka Suzan Bear Carson; born 1941) are American serial killers convicted for three murders between 1981 and 1983 in Northern California and the San Francisco Bay Area.

== Background ==
In 1977, James Carson was in Phoenix, Arizona, when his first wife noticed severe behavioral changes and left with their daughter, Jennifer. Carson began a relationship with Susan Barnes, a divorcée with two teenage sons. James and Susan married, and became involved in illicit drugs and mysticism. At some point, Carson took the name "Michael Bear", telling his daughter in a letter that God had given him the new name "Michael"; Susan became known as "Suzan Bear."

By 1980, after a year-long trip to Europe, the Carsons returned to the U.S. and moved into the Haight-Ashbury neighborhood of San Francisco, California, where they continued their involvement with drugs and the counterculture. By this time, Michael's former wife had become afraid that he would harm her and try to abduct their child, and took steps to hide herself and their daughter from him. She went so far as to move numerous times and cut off contact with mutual acquaintances.

== The murders ==
In March 1981, 23-year-old Karen Barnes (no relation to Suzan), an aspiring actress from Georgia who had been the Carsons' roommate in San Francisco, was found dead in their shared apartment. She had been stabbed thirteen times and her skull crushed before being wrapped in a blanket and hidden in the basement. Evidence suggested that Karen had been killed by someone she knew, and the Carsons became the prime suspects. However, the family disappeared before the body was found. The Carsons later confessed to killing Karen after Suzan had decided Karen was a witch.

The Carsons fled to a mountain hideout near Grants Pass, Oregon, where they remained until spring 1982. They then moved to Alderpoint, California, where they lived and worked on a marijuana farm. According to other workers on the farm, the Carsons were anarchists who advocated revolution and predicted that a nuclear apocalypse would soon occur.

In May 1982, Michael shot and killed Clark Stephens, a worker on the farm with whom he had a dispute, and attempted to dispose of the body by burning it and burying it under chicken fertilizer in the woods. Two weeks later, Stephens was reported missing to the Humboldt County sheriff, leading to the discovery of Stephens' burnt remains.

The Carsons, who by this point had fled, were again considered suspects. Upon searching their abandoned belongings, detectives found a manifesto they had written which called for the assassination of then-President Ronald Reagan. However, authorities had difficulty tracking down the Carsons.

In November 1982, Michael was picked up by police in Los Angeles after an acquaintance saw him hitchhiking. However, through a police error, Carson was quickly freed and vanished before Humboldt County detectives had a chance to question him. He left evidence behind, including a mugshot, address information, and a gun left in a police car.

The following January, the Carsons were hitchhiking near Bakersfield and were given a ride by 30-year-old Jon Charles Hellyar, who was driving to Santa Rosa. Suzan reportedly decided that Hellyar was a witch and had to be killed. While he was driving on U.S. Route 101 in Sonoma County, an argument and physical fight broke out between Hellyar and the Carsons, resulting in the car coming to a stop on River Road. The fight escalated outside the vehicle, and Suzan stabbed Hellyar while he and Michael struggled over a gun. Michael gained control of the gun and killed Hellyar in view of passing motorists, one of whom contacted police. A high-speed chase ensued as the Carsons attempted to flee in Hellyar's car which crashed and they were both apprehended.

== Confessions and aftermath ==
The Carsons initially called a press conference to confess to the murders of Hellyar, Stephens, and Barnes. Before trial, they withdrew their confessions and entered pleas of not guilty. On June 12, 1984, the Carsons were convicted first of Barnes' murder and sentenced to 25 years in prison. Later, they were convicted of the murders of Stephens and Hellyar, for which they received sentences of 50 years to life and 75 years to life, respectively. In 1989, the First District Court of Appeal, affirmed their third conviction as it had previously done on the other two convictions. Michael is incarcerated at Mule Creek State Prison, and Suzan is incarcerated at Central California Women's Facility.

In a five-hour interview with KGO-TV and the San Francisco Chronicle, as well as homicide investigators, the Carsons claimed to have been pacifists and vegetarian yoga practitioners who converted to a form of Islam, and described themselves as "vegetarian Moslem warriors." Their crimes emerged from a shared mission: to exterminate individuals they believed to be "witches". Consequently, the press dubbed them "the San Francisco Witch Killers."

They stated that they killed Barnes because they believed she had made a false conversion to their religion and was "draining Miss Carson of her health and yogic powers." Their justifications for the second and third killings were that Stephens had allegedly sexually assaulted Suzan, and that Hellyar had allegedly called her a "witch" and sexually abused her. From their conviction and through their incarceration up to 2015, they have shown no remorse for their crimes.

They claimed to have traveled through Europe and, back in the United States, through the American Southwest and parts of California. The couple said they kept a list of targeted individuals, including political figures and celebrities such as Reagan and Johnny Carson. According to Richard D. Reynolds, who wrote a book about the case, the Carsons were suspects in nearly a dozen other deaths in the U.S. and Europe.

== In popular culture ==
Underground journalist Richard D. Reynolds wrote a nonfiction book about the murders entitled Cry For War (Squibob Press, 1987). The Carsons' story has also been included in several true crime documentary TV anthologies, including: Deadly Women (Season 6, Episode 1, "Hunting Humans"); Wicked Attraction (Season 2, Episode 1, "The Two Bears"); The Devil You Know (Season 2, Episode 2, "A Serial Killer in the Family"); and Snapped: "Killer Couples", Season 2 Episode 10.

Additionally, the murders are outlined in an episode of the podcast Criminology, including an interview with Jennifer "Jenn" Carson, Michael's daughter from his first marriage, and Lisa Ling interviewed Michael's daughter in an episode titled "Children of Killers" in her series This is Life with Lisa Ling. In 2018, the crimes, along with other murders in the same vicinity, were featured on the Netflix docu-series Murder Mountain.

== See also ==
- List of serial killers in the United States
