= Beatty Creek (California) =

Stream in Humboldt County, California

Coordinates: 40°18′49″N 123°45′47″W

Beatty Creek is a stream located in the U.S. state of California. It is a tributary of Eel River, located in Humboldt County.
