= Beaty Creek =

Stream in Oklahoma, U.S.

Coordinates: 36°20′59″N 94°47′03″W

Beaty Creek is a stream in Benton County, Arkansas and Delaware County, Oklahoma. It is a tributary of Spavinaw Creek.

The stream headwaters arise just north of Arkansas Route 72 about five miles west of Gravette and it flows west crossing under Arkansas Route 43 just north of Maysville and crosses the state line into Oklahoma. In Oklahoma the stream flow to the west-southwest for about ten miles to its confluence with Spavinaw Creek just upstream of Lake Eucha.

The stream headwaters are at and the confluence is at .

A variant name was "Batie Creek". The creek derives its name from Adam Batie, a pioneer settler.
