= Murder Mountain (TV series) =

American true crime docu-series on Netflix

- Genre: True crime
- Directed by: Joshua Zeman
- Country of origin: United States
- Original language: English
- No. of seasons: 1
- No. of episodes: 6

Production
- Executive producers: Camila Jiménez Villa; Stephen Neely
- Running time: 42 minutes
- Production company: Lightbox

Original release
- Network: Fusion TV
- Release: September 23 – October 28, 2018

Murder Mountain, originally marketed as Murder Mountain: Welcome to Humboldt County, is an American true crime documentary television series that premiered on Fusion TV on September 23, 2018. Netflix picked up the series and it premiered on the platform on December 28, 2018. The show covers an area of Northern California's Humboldt County, including the local marijuana industry, and multiple disappearances and murders that have occurred in the surrounding mountain range. Much of the show follows the case of 29-year-old Garret Rodriguez, a cannabis grower who was found murdered in the region in 2013.

== Episodes ==
No.	Title	Original release date
1	"The Redwood Curtain"	September 23, 2018
2	"Paradise Lost"	September 30, 2018
3	"Frontier Justice"	October 7, 2018
4	"The Alderpoint 8"	October 14, 2018
5	"Breaking Point"	October 21, 2018
6	"The Last Outlaws"	October 28, 2018

== Reception ==
Murder Mountain has received mostly positive reviews. Writing for The Daily Beast, Melissa Leon said that though it is "not the next Making a Murderer ... Murder Mountain is an eye-opening watch". Lea Palmieri of Decider wrote, "if a weed farm and several unexplained missing persons doesn't add up to a compelling binge-watch, then nothing does". For Film Inquiry, Tom Bedford describes the series as “a fascinating insight into unique communities, unexplored lands, and disenfranchised voices.” It was the most streamed documentary on Netflix up to that point.

Officials in the Humboldt County area criticized the series and expressed worry over the potential long-term effects on local tourism and economic development. The Humboldt County Sheriff's Office questioned the accuracy of the series, calling it "one side of a highly sensationalized story".

== See also ==
- Alderpoint, California
- Michael Bear Carson and Suzan Carson
- Emerald Triangle
- Sasquatch (TV series)
- Sequoia County, California
