= Black Butte River =

River in California, United States

Coordinates: 39°35′41″N 122°51′31″W

National Wild and Scenic River
- Type: Wild, Scenic
- Designated: October 17, 2006

The Black Butte River is located in the Mendocino National Forest of northern California in Glenn and Mendocino counties. It is a tributary to the Middle Fork Eel River and flows northward for 24 miles (39 km) from its headwaters near Round Mountain to the confluence with the Middle Fork Eel River. The Northern California Coastal Wild Heritage Wilderness Act of 2006 added 21 miles (34 km) of the Black Butte River (and a tributary Cold Creek) to the National Wild and Scenic Rivers System, of which 17.5 miles (28.2 km) are Wild status and 3.5 miles (5.6 km) are Scenic.

Whitewater rafting and fishing are popular on the river and forest service campgrounds are nearby at Plaskett Lakes.

West of Plaskett Lakes is Black Butte with an elevation of 7,455 feet (2,272 m).

== See also ==
- List of rivers in California
