= Alderpoint, California =

- census-designated place
- Location in California Alderpoint, California (the United States)
- Coordinates: 40°10′35″N 123°36′42″W
- Country: United States
- State: California
- County: Humboldt

Area
  - Total: 2.43 sq mi (6.29 km^{2})
  - Land: 2.43 sq mi (6.29 km^{2})
  - Water: 0 sq mi (0.00 km^{2}) 0%
- Elevation: 472 ft (144 m)

Population (2020)
  - Total: 137
  - Density: 56.4/sq mi (21.79/km^{2})
- Time zone: UTC-8 (Pacific (PST))
  - Summer (DST): UTC-7 (PDT)
- ZIP Code: 95511
- Area code(s): 707, 369
- GNIS feature IDs: 2611374; 1657909

Alderpoint (formerly, Alder Point) is a census-designated place in Humboldt County, California, United States, at an elevation of 472 feet (144 m), 11 miles (18 km) east-northeast of Garberville. Its population is 137 as of the 2020 census, down from 186 from the 2010 census. The ZIP Code is 95511 and its area code is 707.

== History ==
The town, named after the abundance of alder trees, began in 1910 as a center for construction of the Northwestern Pacific Railroad. The first post office at Alderpoint opened in 1911.

== Demographics ==
Historical population
| Census | Pop. | Note | %± |
|---|---|---|---|
| 2010 | 186 | | — |
| 2020 | 137 | | −26.3% |
U.S. Decennial Census; 1860–1870 1880-1890; 1900 1910 1920; 1930 1940 1950; 1960 1970 1980; 1990 2000 2010

Alderpoint first appeared as a census designated place in the 2010 U.S. census.

=== Racial and ethnic composition ===
Race and Ethnicity
| Racial and ethnic composition | 2010 | 2020 |
|---|---|---|
| White (non-Hispanic) | 87.1% | 62.77% |
| Hispanic or Latino (of any race) | 5.38% | 16.06% |
| Two or more races (non-Hispanic) | 2.15% | 9.49% |
| Native American (non-Hispanic) | 4.84% | 8.76% |
| Asian (non-Hispanic) | 0.54% | 1.46% |
| Pacific Islander (non-Hispanic) | 0.0% | 0.73% |
| Other (non-Hispanic) | 0.0% | 0.73% |
| Black or African American (non-Hispanic) | 0.0% | 0.0% |

=== 2020 census ===
As of the 2020 census, Alderpoint had a population of 137. The population density was 56.4 inhabitants per square mile (21.8/km^{2}). The median age was 40.3 years. The age distribution was 19.7% under the age of 18, 4.4% aged 18 to 24, 31.4% aged 25 to 44, 24.1% aged 45 to 64, and 20.4% who were 65 years of age or older. For every 100 females there were 121.0 males, and for every 100 females age 18 and over there were 115.7 males age 18 and over.

0.0% of residents lived in urban areas, while 100.0% lived in rural areas.

There were 62 households, of which 17.7% had children under the age of 18 living in them. Of all households, 21.0% were married-couple households, 25.8% were cohabiting couple households, 33.9% had a male householder with no spouse or partner present, and 19.4% had a female householder with no spouse or partner present. About 37.1% of all households were made up of individuals and 9.7% had someone living alone who was 65 years of age or older. The average household size was 2.21. There were 26 families (41.9% of all households).

There were 74 housing units at an average density of 30.5 units per square mile (11.8 units/km^{2}), of which 62 (83.8%) were occupied and 16.2% were vacant. Of the occupied units, 91.9% were owner-occupied and 8.1% were renter-occupied. The homeowner vacancy rate was 0.0% and the rental vacancy rate was 0.0%.

== Climate ==
Climate data for Alderpoint
| Month | Jan | Feb | Mar | Apr | May | Jun | Jul | Aug | Sep | Oct | Nov | Dec | Year |
|---|---|---|---|---|---|---|---|---|---|---|---|---|---|
| Mean daily maximum °F (°C) | 53.6 (12.0) | 59.1 (15.1) | 62.3 (16.8) | 68.2 (20.1) | 74.4 (23.6) | 81.4 (27.4) | 90.9 (32.7) | 90.3 (32.4) | 86.7 (30.4) | 74.8 (23.8) | 61.3 (16.3) | 53.7 (12.1) | 71.4 (21.9) |
| Mean daily minimum °F (°C) | 35.4 (1.9) | 37.9 (3.3) | 38.8 (3.8) | 41.2 (5.1) | 45.4 (7.4) | 49.4 (9.7) | 52.4 (11.3) | 52.2 (11.2) | 48.6 (9.2) | 44 (7) | 40.5 (4.7) | 36.3 (2.4) | 43.5 (6.4) |
| Average precipitation inches (mm) | 10.6 (270) | 7.8 (200) | 5.8 (150) | 3.2 (81) | 1.6 (41) | 0.5 (13) | 0 (0) | 0.4 (10) | 0.8 (20) | 3.6 (91) | 7.3 (190) | 9.4 (240) | 50.9 (1,290) |
Source: Weatherbase

== Politics ==
In the state legislature, Alderpoint is in the 2nd senatorial district, represented by Democrat Mike McGuire, and the 2nd Assembly district, represented by Democrat Chris Rogers.

Federally, it is in California's 2nd congressional district, represented by Democrat Jared Huffman.

== Notable people ==
- Michael Bear Carson and Suzan Carson, serial killers
- Frank Cieciorka, graphic artist
- ED Denson, managed the prominent band Country Joe and The Fish that performed at Woodstock. In later years, he built a successful law practice centered around representing the local marijuana growers in the area.
- Bruce Loose, singer and bassist of the punk band, Flipper.

== Historic "Murder Mountain" ==
The Rancho Sequoia area of Alderpoint is called "Murder Mountain" from the actions of the Carson serial killers (Michael Bear Carson and Suzan Carson), including the murder of 26-year-old Clark Stephens on May 17, 1982, and for other disappearances, murders and rumored murders.

Two high-profile missing persons are Robert "Bobby" Tennison, a 38-year-old father of four, missing since January 2009, and Garret Rodriguez, a 29-year-old from San Diego, California, who was reported missing on April 25, 2013, by his father. In their last conversation in December 2012, Rodriguez told his father, Val Rodriguez, he was headed to "Murder Mountain" to work on a marijuana grow. After he went missing, his truck was found in June 2013. On November 28, 2013, human remains were found in a grave on private property on Jewett Road, one day after a group of locals forced the admission from the suspect known to have committed the murder, about the exact location of a grave believed to be Rodriguez's. On December 17, the remains were identified as Rodriguez's, and he was confirmed a victim of a homicide. It is suspected that the anonymous tip came from a confession extracted from the man responsible for the murder, who gave up the information after being kidnapped, shot twice, and threatened by a group of eight local vigilantes on Thanksgiving Day. In 2018, Rodriguez and "Murder Mountain" were featured in the Netflix documentary series Murder Mountain.

Across the valley from Rancho Sequoia on Pratt Mountain, in 1973, 24-year-old Dirk Dickenson was shot in the back by Federal agent Lloyd Clifton during a military-style federal raid which arrived at his property by helicopter. Dickenson was found blameless by a Federal Department of Justice investigation; charges against his killer were moved to federal court and ultimately dismissed. Dickenson was posthumously featured on the cover of Rolling Stone and is recognized as the first victim of the U.S. war on drugs.

== See also ==
- Sequoia County, California
- Murder Mountain (TV series)
