= San Gorgonio =

San Gorgonio is Spanish for "Saint Gorgonius";

San Gorgonio might also refer to:

== Landforms and parks ==
- San Gorgonio Mountain, California, United States
- San Gorgonio Pass, California, United States
- San Gorgonio River, California, United States
- San Gorgonio Wilderness, California, United States

== Establishments and organizations ==
- San Gorgonio Council, of Girl Scouts
- San Gorgonio course, a golf course at Sun City Palm Desert, California
- San Gorgonio High School, in San Bernardino, California
- San Gorgonio Inn, in Banning, California
- San Gorgonio Memorial Hospital, in Banning, California
- San Gorgonio Memorial Park, cemetery in Banning, California
- San Gorgonio Pass Campus, a satellite campus of Mt. San Jacinto College
- San Gorgonio Pass Wind Farm, located on the eastern slope of the San Gorgonio Pass
- San Gorgonio Wilderness Association, works to support the San Gorgonio Wilderness

== Historical ==
- San Gorgonio, an early name for Beaumont, California
- San Gorgonio Handicap, previous name of the Robert J. Frankel Stakes American horse race
- San Gorgonio Unified School District, defunct; divided into Beaumont and Banning Unified School Districts

== See also ==
- Rancho San Gorgonio (disambiguation)
