= San Gorgonio Pass =

Mountain pass in Riverside County, California, United States

- Banning Pass
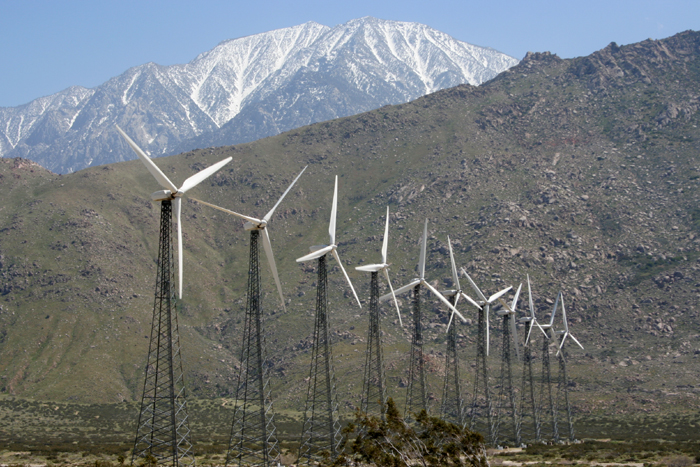
- A segment of the San Gorgonio Pass wind farm

- Location within southern California Location within California Location within the United States
- Elevation: 2,600 ft (790 m) NGVD 29
- Traversed by: I-10; Bradshaw Trail (Historically)

Location
- Location: Riverside County, California, U.S
- Range: San Bernardino Mountains / San Jacinto Mountains
- Coordinates: 33°55′12.1″N 116°58′14.1″W
- Topo map: Beaumont

The San Gorgonio Pass, or Banning Pass, is a 2,600 ft (790 m) elevation gap on the rim of the Great Basin between the San Bernardino Mountains to the north and the San Jacinto Mountains to the south. The pass was formed by the San Andreas Fault, a major transform fault between the Pacific plate and the North American plate that is slipping at a rate of 7.2 ±2.8 mm/year. The tall mountain ranges on either side of the pass result in the pass being a transitional zone from a Mediterranean climate west of the pass, to a Desert climate east of the pass. This also makes the pass area one of the windiest places in the United States, and why it is home to the San Gorgonio Pass wind farm.

It serves as a major transportation corridor between the Greater Los Angeles region and the Coachella Valley, and ultimately into Arizona and the United States interior. Both Interstate 10 and the Sunset Route of the Union Pacific Railroad utilize the pass. When the rail line was completed in January 1883 for the Southern Pacific Railroad, it was billed as the second U.S. transcontinental railroad.

The pass is one of the deepest mountain passes in the 48 contiguous states, with the mountains to either side rising almost 9,000 ft (2,700 m) above its base. 11,503-foot (3,506 m) San Gorgonio Mountain, taller but farther away and less visible, is at the northern side of the pass, and 10,834 ft (3,302 m) Mount San Jacinto is on the southern side. Mount San Jacinto has the fifth-largest rock wall in North America, and its peak is only 6 miles (9.7 km) south of Interstate 10. The pass is also referred to as the Banning Pass due to the town of Banning being located about 6.5 miles (10.5 km) east of the pass summit. The city itself was named for Phineas Banning who founded the town.

== Geology ==
The pass is the major geologic divide between the igneous batholithic Peninsular Ranges and the Transverse Ranges, which is a massive fault block composed of diverse forms of rock. The pass is the single "largest discontinuity along the San Andreas fault". One active branch of the San Andreas Fault passes through the San Gorgonio Pass roughly parallel and just to the north of interstate 10. Active parts of the Banning, the Garnet Hill and the San Gorgonio Pass Thrust faults are associated with the San Andreas Fault through the Pass. Together, these faults accommodate strike-slip and reverse slip that contributes to both uplift of the San Bernardino Mountains and overall movement between the North American plate and the Pacific plate.

== Geography ==
=== Climate ===
The San Gorgonio Pass area tends to get snow at least once or twice during the winter months, although it rarely sticks to hard surfaces, such as the freeway or city streets.

=== Topography ===
The San Gorgonio River runs through the pass, west to east, and joins the Whitewater River near the community of Whitewater at the northwest end of Coachella Valley.

== Transportation ==
The Southern Pacific Railroad (now the Union Pacific) laid down tracks through the pass in 1875. Amtrak's Sunset Limited and Texas Eagle intercity passenger trains continue to run on the line in addition to several freight trains. Additionally, the Riverside County Transportation Commission is studying the establishment of daily passenger service from Los Angeles to the Coachella Valley, including at least one station in the San Gorgonio Pass area.

The summit of the pass is in Beaumont, just east of the junction of Interstate 10 and State Route 79, at an elevation of about 2,600 ft (790 m). However, the heart of the pass is generally considered to be further east near Cabazon, where the passageway between the two mountain ranges is narrowest. Eastward from there, the route descends steeply towards the Coachella Valley, with the eastern end of the pass taken to be at the junction of Interstate 10 and State Route 111 near Whitewater Canyon. In 1952 an expressway was built through the pass, carrying U.S. Route 99, U.S. Route 70 and U.S. Route 60. There are still portions of the old U.S. 99 route between Whitewater Canyon and Cabazon. Main Street in Cabazon, Ramsey Street in Banning, 6th Street in Beaumont, and Roberts Road in Calimesa are all old sections of U.S. 99.

The Banning Municipal Airport, located in the pass, is a small public airport operated by the city of Banning.

== Places in the San Gorgonio Pass ==
=== Populated places ===
- Banning
- Bonnie Bell
- Beaumont
- Cabazon
- Calimesa
- Cherry Valley
- Highland Springs
- Morongo Reservation

=== Places of interest ===
- AC Dysart Equestrian Center
- Bogart Regional Park
- Cabazon Dinosaurs
- Desert Hills Premium Outlets
- Edward-Dean Museum & Gardens
- Gilman Ranch
- Highland Springs Resort/Ranch & Inn
- Malki Museum
- Morongo Casino, Resort & Spa
- Museum of Pinball
- Pacific Crest Trail
- San Gorgonio Pass Wind Farm

=== Other notable facilities ===
- Larry D. Smith Correctional Facility
- San Gorgonio Memorial Hospital
