= Lewis deSoto =

Native American artist (born 1954)

- Born: 1954 (age 71–72); San Bernardino, California, U.S.
- Citizenship: United States
- Education: Claremont Graduate School, University of California, Riverside
- Known for: Installation, public art, video, photography, printmaking, sculpture
- Awards: Guggenheim Fellowship; National Endowment for the Arts; Flintridge Foundation
- Website: www.lewisdesoto.net

Lewis deSoto, Cahuilla, customized General Motors pickup truck with tapestry upholstery tonneau cover, audio program, automated flashing lights, custom emblems and paint scheme, 6.5' x 6.75' x 18', 2006.

Lewis deSoto (born 1954) is an American conceptual artist, based in Napa, California. His art explores cosmology, the human connection to landscape, and sociocultural histories related to being an American of Hispanic and Native American Cahuilla descent. DeSoto's artistic output includes video and sound installations, photography, prints, public art and sculptural objects such as giant inflatables and drivable custom cars. Critics characterize his approach as reflexive and "syncretistic"—one that freely mixes contrasting metaphors, symbols and concepts in a sometimes playful manner. In a review of deSoto's retrospective at the Institute of Contemporary Art San José, David M. Roth observed, "regardless of media, his work revolves around three themes: desire, mortality and transcendence. The result is a portrait of a hydrocarbon-powered, millennia-straddling Zen Catholic whose quest for meaning roams from the earthly to the ethereal."

DeSoto's work belongs to public collections including the Museum of Modern Art, Museum of Contemporary Art, Los Angeles, Los Angeles County Museum of Art, San Jose Museum of Art, Museum of Contemporary Art San Diego and Seattle Art Museum. He has exhibited at the latter four museums, as well as the New Museum, Smithsonian Institution, Denver Art Museum and Phoenix Art Museum, among others. In 2024, deSoto was awarded a Guggenheim Fellowship.

== Life and career ==
DeSoto was born in San Bernardino, California in 1954. He lived the first half of his life in the surrounding Inland Empire region; his family's roots trace in part back to the area's Cahuilla people. DeSoto studied at the University of California, Riverside, receiving a BA in studio art and minor in religious studies in 1978, and at Claremont Graduate School, earning an MFA in 1981. He began teaching in the 1980s at schools including Otis Art Institute, Cornish College of the Arts, California College of Arts and Crafts, and San Francisco State University (1988–2020), where he is professor emeritus.

In addition to his 2009 retrospective, deSoto has had solo institutional exhibitions at the San Jose Museum of Art (1991), Artpace (1996), Columbus Museum of Art (2004), di Rosa Center for Contemporary Art (2008), Palm Springs Art Museum (2011), Santa Barbara Museum of Art (2016) and Museum of Contemporary Art San Diego (2018), among others.

== Work and reception ==
Critics identify heterogeneity in terms of cultural references, themes and media as a significant aspect of deSoto's work. His influences include conceptual and land art, Buddhist, Cahuilla, Catholic and Muslim cosmologies, the visionary literature of Hermann Hesse, phenomenology and scientific theory. This plurality results in a free play of metaphor, symbol and language in which objects and relationships are neither merely metaphorical nor merely representational, leaving the work open to a multiplicity of ideas and meanings, inexplicability and humor.

Thematically, deSoto's art is often likened to spiritual journey involving transcendence or identity. He often sets up confrontations between the mortal world of bodily and sensory desire and the infinite realm, or between contrasting cultures, eras and philosophies. Rebecca Solnit contends that deSoto's approach liberates his art from Eurocentric conceptual binaries, such as nature versus culture, sacred versus quotidian, and perfection versus fallenness.

Performance and interaction are also significant aspects of deSoto's work. His photographic series approach landscape from an experimental position centered on documenting encounters between camera and environment rather than composing images. He turned to installation and sculpture in the 1990s, seeking embodied viewer participation in his work involving movement, sound and space. These efforts also involve presenting work in non-art-world contexts such as car shows and showrooms, parking lots and national parks.

Lewis deSoto Ellipse Tide, ink jet color photograph from color negative, light, performance, long exposure, 30” x 30”, 1982.

=== Early photographic projects ===
DeSoto's early experimentations with photographic exposure, light and materials explored landscape as an experience. The blurred and crowded, slow-exposure Botanica images (1980) emphasized the light-responsiveness shared by flowers and photographic film, creating a metaphorical and reciprocal relationship that upended oppositions of organic to mechanical. In his "Site Projects" series (1981–86),.deSoto responded to the earthworks of sculptors like Robert Smithson. Rather than physically alter locations, he shot long exposures of moving light sources at night to create time-lapse effects suggesting ideas of infinity and the transience of humanity (e.g., Ellipse Tide, 1982).

With Tahualtapa (1983–1988), deSoto shifted toward sculpture. The mixed-media series centered on the shifting essence and perceptions regarding a San Bernardino County mountain that had been leveled. Its four works each featured an inscribed title and frame filled with materials (feathers, marble dust and slabs of cement) representing its role across three cultures: as the Cahuilla "Hill of the Ravens," Spanish colonial "Cerrito Solo," and American "Marble Mountain" and Slover Mountain cement quarries.

=== Installations, 1990–present ===
DeSoto's early sound and projection installations drew upon Native American culture, California settings and enigmatic arrangements of objects in order to examine traditional and modern attitudes about land and universe. In Haypatak, Witness, Kansatsusha (1990/1995), he again explored landscape as a locus of cultural change (in this case, Drakes Bay, Sir Francis Drake's California landing site). Titled with the Miwok, English and Japanese words for "witness," its wall-sized video projection featured contrasting sounds and visual styles—close-ups of flora and water, chaotic sweeping pans, and meditative skyscapes—portraying three cultural modes of consciousness. As viewers approached the dimly lit installation via a jetty-like strip of slatted wooden flooring over a bed of stones, their shadows became part of the work. In Pe Tukmiyat, Pe Tukmiyat (Darkness, Darkness) (1991) and Tahquitz (1994–96), deSoto created symbolic representations of Cahuilla creation myths as austere, quasi-domestic scenes accompanied by moody lighting, video and sound. Tahquitz referenced the story of a mountain demigod that feeds on human souls; the installation featured a long, galvanized table supporting two large blocks of ice that melted into ceramic vases, bounded by real-time and time-lapse videos of the San Jacinto Mountains.

Lewis deSoto, End of Desire, cocoa shells, wooden plank and colored lamps, various locations, 2001–09; photograph: Headlands Center for the Arts, 2001.

In the later installations End of Desire (2001–09) and Lament (2009–15), deSoto delved into broader themes involving sensory desire and transcendence. The former—deemed a "Zen joke" about temptation and resistance in one review—consisted of a wooden pier elevated above a room strewn with overpoweringly fragrant cocoa hulls. Lament was a cathedral-like meditation on transience; it featured a narrow corridor lit by a dim ray of blue light, which reverberated with a haunting melody improvised by an opera singer to words from the Hermann Hesse novel, The Glass Bead Game.

DeSoto returned to Native American folklore in the public installation Carlota (2016, Joshua Tree National Park), taking up the 1909 true-life, tragic "Willie Boy" incident in which a Chemehuevi–Paiute pair of lovers lost their lives amid one of the largest manhunts in the history of the West. He reoriented prior Eurocentric versions of the story—told in words, sound and graphic line drawings on plaques along the park's trail—to reflect Native perspectives, particularly Carlota's.

=== Sculpture and custom cars ===
In the latter 1990s, deSoto turned to individual sculptural works, including contemplative pieces about corporeal existence prompted by the death of his father; among them were a wooden, body-shaped armature covered with fabric, and Recumbent (1999), a ticking suit of armor arrayed on the floor. He pursued that theme further with Paranirvana (self-portrait) (2003–16), a 26-foot-long inflatable reclining Buddha with his own image superimposed onto the face, which reinterpreted a 12th-century stone monument at the Gal Vihara in Sri Lanka. Inflated each morning and deflated in the evening, the sculpture (one of four versions) mixed levity—a trompe l'oeil rock effect and car-dealership inflatable associations—with deeper themes involving rebirth, spiritual and bodily transcendence, Western versus Buddhist notions of self, and the transience of art. The Chicago Sun-Times compared the work to "being present at the deathbed of some spiritual eminence."

In the 2000s, deSoto produced three fully functional conceptual cars. He transformed a 1965 Chrysler New Yorker to create Conquest (2004), which examines intersecting automotive, cultural and personal histories centered on the name deSoto: the automaker's DeSoto vehicle line (1929–1961), the colonial Spanish conquistador, and the artist's conflicted relationship to that colonial legacy (he has a vague familial connection to the conquistador). Mining divergent references, deSoto modified the car's emblem and styling with representations of a sword and pox virus (historical agents of destruction) and colonial detailing, aggressive extended wheels, and interior embellishments of ostentatious luxury. The fictitious vehicle was convincing enough to take second prize in a California Chrysler car show as a recreated, long-lost prototype.

Cahuilla (2006) is a reworked 1981 General Motors pickup, the year marking when Indian tribes received the right to build and run gaming casinos. Its design included gambling, currency and tribal motifs, pulsing hidden LED lights, and a sound loop of slot machine tunes, casino sounds and traditional Native chants. Nick Stone described these hybrid details as reflections of an adaptive history: "a singular convergence of indigenous tradition, newfound economic prosperity, a distinctly regional form of reified self-expression and the practical needs of desert survival," which deSoto channeled through Southern California's flashy customized car culture. DeSoto examined the military-industrial complex and national identity through Imperial America (2008), a 1956 Chrysler Imperial fitted with a 10.5-foot scale model of a CC-56 Redstone ballistic missile; it referenced Chrysler's role in the Manhattan Project and little-known role in Cold War defense engineering.

Lewis deSoto Agua Mansa 2 07.31.12, "Empire" series, Panoramic photographic ink jet print, 20” x 111”, 2012.

=== Later wallworks ===
DeSoto's print and photographic work in the 2000s reflects themes common to his installation works. He based the "KLS" (2007) prints of intensely hued concentric circles on descriptions of color in the chapters of the Hesse novella Klingsor's Last Summer, about a painter facing death by embracing the sensual in life; they were likened to the color field paintings of Kenneth Noland.

In two photographic projects, deSoto returned to landscape. He revisited the variegated and ecologically challenged Inland Empire region in the "Empire" series (2012–15). An exhibition (Fullerton Museum of Art, 2015) presented panoramic images (some 12 feet wide), each created by digitally merging up to 200 handheld photographs to simulate vistas viewed from a moving car. A book, Empire: Photographs and Essays (2016), featured panoramic and unpopulated single-frame images, as well as essays based on deSoto's memories and personal history. The exhibition "Arbor/Ardor" (2018) featured tree-centered, performative images and video spanning decades, which explored the intersection of human activity, space, time and landscape.

== Collections and recognition ==
DeSoto's work belongs to the collections of the Autry Museum of the American West, Berkeley Art Museum, California Museum of Photography, Center for Creative Photography, Columbus Museum of Art, Crocker Art Museum, di Rosa Center for Contemporary Art, Los Angeles County Museum of Art, Museum of Contemporary Art Los Angeles, Museum of Contemporary Art San Diego, Museum of Modern Art, Museum of Photographic Arts, Orange County Museum of Art, Petersen Automotive Museum, San Francisco Museum of Modern Art, San Jose Museum of Art, Santa Barbara Museum of Art, and Seattle Art Museum, among others.

He has received a John S. Guggenheim Foundation fellowship (2024) and awards from the Flintridge Foundation (2003), Fleishhacker Foundation (1999), National Endowment for the Arts (1996) and California Arts Council (1992). He has been awarded artist residencies from organizations including Artpace, Headlands Center for the Arts, Institute of American Indian Arts and MIT List Visual Arts Center.

DeSoto has been commissioned to produce a number of public artworks, in cities including Phoenix, San Antonio, San Francisco and San Jose. They include: Lineage of Wings (1992), a series of 22 etched glass panels at Phoenix Sky Harbor International Airport; the multi-pronged project On the Air, including light projections at San Francisco International Airport (2000–06); and the suspended steel sculpture and shadow work Labyrinth Gateway (University of Texas San Antonio, 2003).
