= Journal of California and Great Basin Anthropology =

- Discipline: Anthropology
- Language: English

Publication details
- Former name: Journal of California Anthropology
- History: 1974 to present
- Publisher: Malki Museum Press (United States)
- Frequency: Biannual

Standard abbreviations
- ISO 4: J. Calif. Gt. Basin Anthropol.

Indexing
- ISSN: 0191-3557 (print); 2327-9400 (web)
- OCLC no.: 4853558

Links
- Journal homepage

The Journal of California and Great Basin Anthropology is a leading regional source of scholarly information on the ethnography, archaeology, linguistics, and Native American history of the Western United States created by Harry Lawton.

It is published by Malki Museum Press, based on the Morongo Indian Reservation in Banning, California.

Begun in 1974 as the Journal of California Anthropology, it expanded its scope and changed to its present name in 1979. It has usually published two issues per year.

The journal's editors have included:

- Michael Kearney (1974–1976)
- Philip J. Wilke (1977–1980, 1986–1990)
- Harry W. Lawton (1980)
- Matthew C. Hall (1980–1985)
- Michael K. Lerch (1985)
- Mark Q. Sutton (1986–1989, 1991–2000)
- Jill Gardner (1998–2000)
- Paul Apodaca (2001–2004)
- Lynn H. Gamble (2005–2010)
- Todd Braje (2011–2012)
- Bill Hildebrandt (2013–2017)
- Adrian Whitaker (2017–2020)
- Seetha Reddy (2020–2024)
- Christopher Morgan (2024-2026)
- Loukas Barton (2026- )
