= Museum of Pinball =

- Established: 2013
- Dissolved: September 2021
- Location: 700 S Hathaway St; Banning, California, 92220; United States
- Coordinates: 33.9189°N 116.8590°W
- Type: Sports museum
- Website: www.museumofpinball.org

The Museum of Pinball was a non-profit museum dedicated to the preservation and advocacy of pinball machines and other arcade games. The museum was located in Banning, California, United States, and opened in 2013. With an 18-acre campus, over 40,000 sq ft of museum space, and over 700 total games on display it was billed as the largest pinball museum in the world. The museum was open infrequently to the public, mostly functioning as an event space.

Due to costs of maintaining the collection, the Museum closed in September 2021 and auctioned off its collection.

== History ==
The museum was founded in 2013 by pinball machine collector John Weeks.

In January 2015 the Guinness Book of World Records recognized the museum as setting a record for the most people playing pinball simultaneously. Later that year the museum was incorporated into the Palm Springs Modernism Week events and billed as Retro Pinball Mania.

In 2020, the organization sought to gain a larger space in Palm Springs to hold its collection, as storage costs for their current location had risen too high. However, while they had secured the rights to move into the property, the planned building had been sold to a new agent, and the costs and time to renovate the facility, along with the costs for ongoing storage, were beyond the funding that the organization could support. As a result, in June 2021, the organization announced that they may have to sell off their excess machines to save costs on storage space unless they were able to get additional funding within a few weeks. The Museum was unable to obtain additional funding within necessary deadlines, and in July 2021, announced they would be shuttering the museum, with auctions to sell off their collection to occur within the coming months. In September 2021 it announced auction dates for its collection. The auction drew higher prices for the pinball tables than they were considered normal, which were tied to speculative collectors that had similarly driven the collection of prices of retro video games in 2020 and 2021.

== See also ==
- Pinball museum (disambiguation), Alameda, CA
- Pinball Hall of Fame (disambiguation)
