= Jaas Newen =

Chilean rapper

- Born: Jennifer Andrea Aguilera Silva; 1980; Santiago
- Occupation: Rapper

Jennifer Andrea Aguilera Silva (born 1980) is a Chilean rapper of Mapuche heritage who raps in Spanish and Mapuzungún under the names Jaas and Jaas Newen.

Jennifer Aguilera Silva was born in 1980 in Santiago and grew up in San Joaquín. Her family was of Mapuche heritage but did not discuss their heritage and Silva had to teach herself the Mapuzungún language.

She released her first album, En este mundo, in 2004. It included the song "Newen" (Mapuzungún for "life-force"), which blends hip-hop with traditional Maphuche music and instruments. The music video for "Newen" was shown at the 2006 Smithsonian Institution’s Native American Film and Video Festival (NAFVF) and at similar events on other continents. Silva went on to release four more albums, including Piwke (2018). She also hosted the radio show Generación Consciente from 2019 to 2021.
