= Gorgonius =

Christian martyr

Saint Gorgonius of Nicomedia
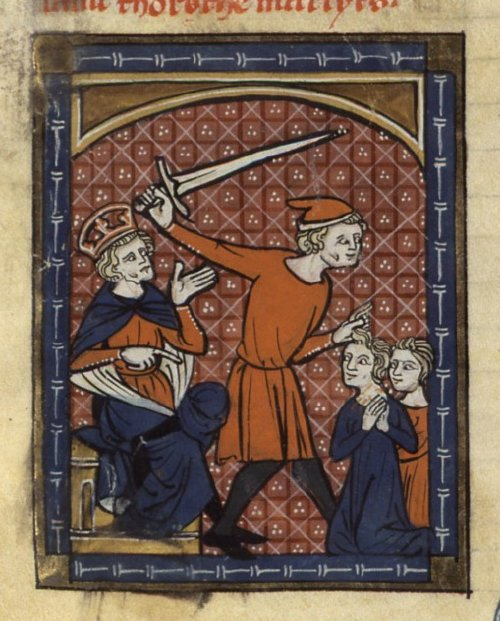
- The martyrdom of Gorgonius and Dorotheus, 14th century French manuscript.

Martyr
- Born: 3rd century AD
- Died: 304 AD; Nicomedia (modern-day Izmit, Kocaeli, Turkey)
- Venerated in: Eastern Orthodox Church; Catholic Church
- Feast: 12 March

Gorgonius or Gorgon (Greek: Ἅγιος Γοργόνιος Νικομηδείας) was a Christian who was martyred in AD 304 alongside Peter Cubicularius and a certain Dorotheus at Nicomedia during the Diocletianic Persecution.

== Life ==
According to Lactantius and Eusebius, Gorgonius held a high position in the household of the emperor. When the persecution began he was consequently among the first to be charged, and with his companions, Peter, Dorotheus and several others, brutally tortured and then finally strangled.

According to one version of the legend, Diocletian, wishing to expose Christians in his household, ordered everyone to pay honor to the Roman gods; if they refused, they would be exposed as Christians. The first to be exposed was Diocletian's butler, Peter, surnamed Cubicularius ("valet, chamberlain"), who was strung up, his flesh torn from his bones. Two Christians, Dorotheus, an imperial chamberlain, and Gorgonius, an army officer, protested this treatment, and were also martyred, together with another official, named Migdonius. In the meantime, Peter was boiled or burned alive, or “roasted on a gridiron.”

Diocletian, determined that their bodies should not receive the honors which the early Christians gave the relics of the martyrs, ordered them to be thrown into the sea. The Christians nevertheless obtained possession of them and later the body of Gorgonius was carried to Rome.

== Veneration ==
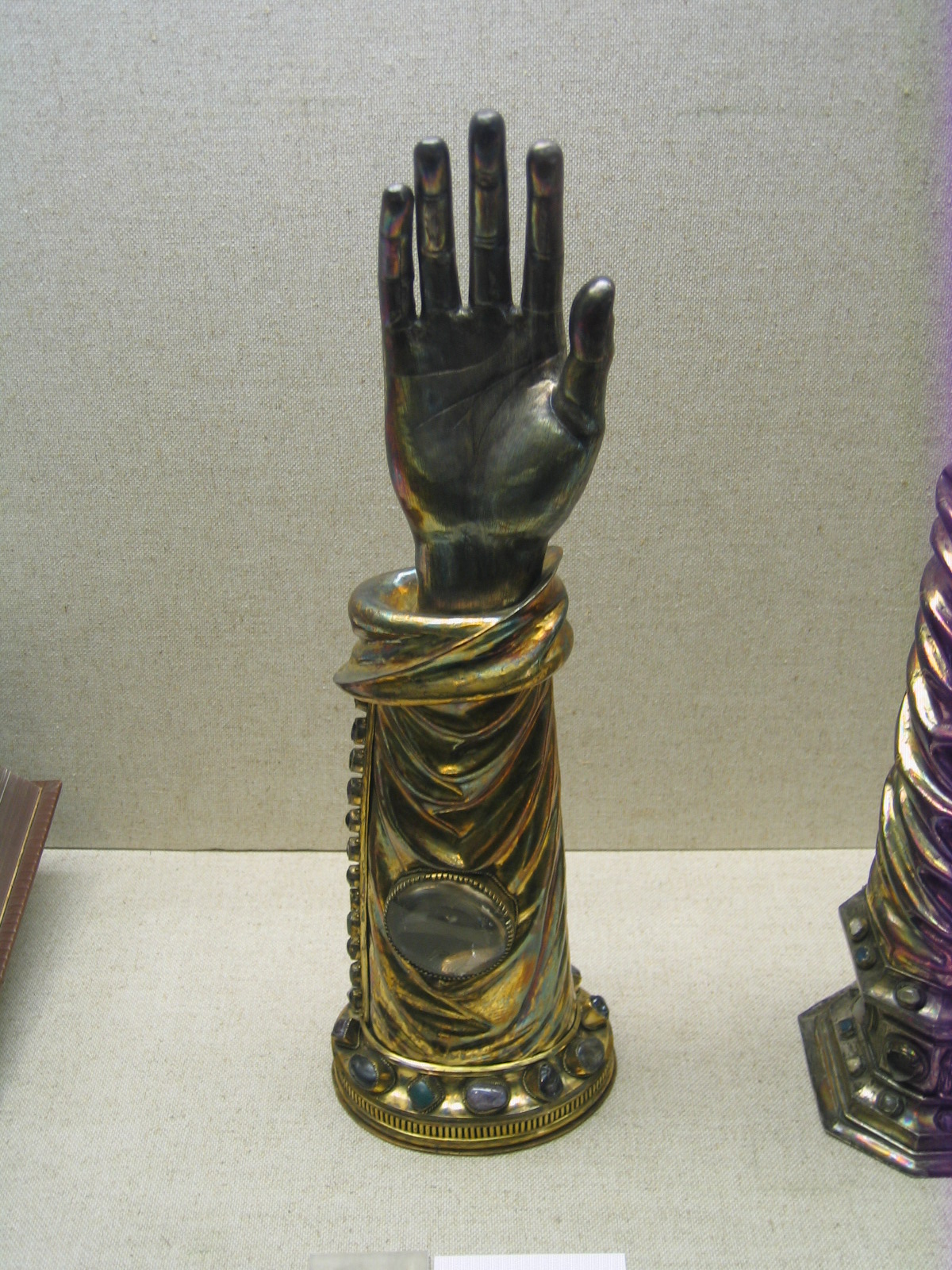
Arm reliquary of Gorgonius of Nicomedia at Minden Cathedral.

In the 8th century, the remains were translated by Chrodegang, Bishop of Metz to the monastery of Gorze in Lorraine. Some of the relics were translated to Minden.

Many French churches obtained portions of the saint's body from Gorze, but in the chaos of the French Revolution, most of these relics were lost. The feast of Gorgonius and his companions is kept on March 12 by the Roman Catholic Church, and on September 3 by the Eastern Orthodox Church.

== Gorgonius of Rome ==
Saint Gorgonius of Rome, who has sometimes been confused with Gorgonius of Nicomedia, is an early Roman martyr commemorated on 9 September. All that is known of him is his name and that he was buried on a 9 September in the cemetery known as "Inter duas lauros" (between the two laurel trees) on the Via Labicana. Owing to the paucity of information about him, he was removed from the General Roman Calendar, when this was revised in 1969, but not from the official list of saints of the Catholic Church, the Roman Martyrology.

Epigram 24 of Pope Damasus I

Martyris hic tumulus magno sub vertice montis
Gorgonium retinet, servat qui altaria Christi.
hic, quicumque venit, sanctorum limina quaerat,
inveniet vicina in sede habitare beatos,
ad caelum pariter pietas quos vexit euntes.

Translation: This martyr's tomb beneath a great hilltop holds Gorgonius, guardian of the altars of Christ. Whoever comes to seek here the thresholds of the saints will find that in the nearby dwelling abide the blessed whom likewise, as they went, piety bore to heaven.

== Other Gorgonii ==
A third saint of this name was a member of the Forty Martyrs of Sebaste, otherwise known as the soldiers of the "Thundering Legion".

The different Gorgonii seem to have been frequently confused. The Catholic Encyclopaedia mentions others of the same name of whom virtually nothing is known.

Gorgonius was also the name of a man ridiculed by Horace in his satires for having an "ill smell".(Satire 1.2, 27)

== Legacy ==
Rancho San Gorgonio was a ranch in Southern California that was established in 1824 by Spanish missionaries, who named the ranch in honor of Saint Gorgonius. The ranch was one of the principal rancherias, and the most distant, of the San Gabriel Mission, near what is now Los Angeles, California. It occupied most of today's San Gorgonio Pass area. The name of the ranch was applied to a number of local landmarks, and their names in turn have been applied to various establishments, organizations, and more. These include:

- San Gorgonio Pass, the site of the ranch
- San Gorgonio Mountain, an 11,500 foot peak north of the pass
- San Gorgonio River, a seasonal river / wash that runs through the pass

See also San Gorgonio (disambiguation)

== Bibliography ==
- Oxford Dictionary of Saints (Oxford, 2004)
