= Bonnie Bell =

Bonnie Bell, Bonne Bell or Bonny Bell might refer to:

- Bonne Bell Cosmetics Company
- Bonnie Bell, California, in Riverside County
- Bonnie Bell, a Character in the 1923 film The Man Next Door
- Bonnie Bell (song), composed by Joseph Buell Carey
- Bonny Bell, a painting by Robert Herdman
