= Claude K. Bell =

American sculptor best known for the Cabazon Dinosaurs

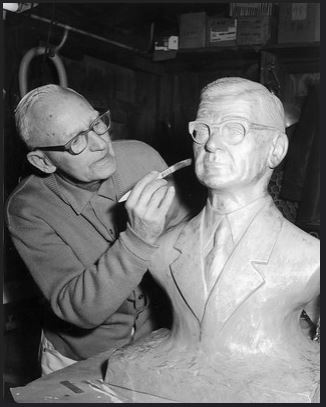
- Bell with his bust of Walter Knott, 1967
- Born: 1896; Atlantic City, New Jersey, U.S.
- Died: September 19, 1988 (aged 91–92); Anaheim, California, U.S.
- Occupations: Sculptor; artist
- Known for: Cabazon Dinosaurs

Claude K. Bell (1896 – September 19, 1988) was an American sculptor and theme park artist best known for creating the giant concrete dinosaurs in Cabazon, California. Bell worked for many years at Knott's Berry Farm, and later built the roadside attractions known as the Cabazon Dinosaurs — Dinny the Dinosaur and Mr. Rex — which remain iconic landmarks along Interstate 10.

== Early life ==
Bell was born in Atlantic City, New Jersey, in 1896. As a teenager, he sculpted sand figures on the beach (famously teddy bears), earning tips from passersby. His father worked as a glassblower on the boardwalk. Inspired by the elephant-shaped building “Lucy” in Atlantic City, Bell later said he wanted to build something as memorable.

== Career at Knott's Berry Farm ==
In 1947, Bell was hired by Walter Knott to create concrete figures for the Ghost Town section of Knott’s Berry Farm, replacing earlier temporary props. He made numerous life-size statues including miners, saloon girls, and cowboys, among them “Handsome Brady and Whiskey Bill” (cowboys on a bench) and a large Minuteman statue outside the park’s Independence Hall replica.

He also operated a portrait studio at Knott’s from around 1951 until 1986, creating old-fashioned portraits of park guests.

== Cabazon Dinosaurs ==
In 1964, Bell began construction of a giant brontosaurus named Dinny on his property in Cabazon, near Palm Springs, intended to attract customers to his nearby restaurant, the Wheel Inn.

Dinny is about 150 feet long and 45 feet tall, made from steel mesh skeleton and sprayed concrete; its interior was built to house a gift shop and a small prehistoric exhibition space.

Later, Bell built the second dinosaur, a Tyrannosaurus rex called Mr. Rex, completed in 1986.

Bell reportedly spent over **$250,000** of his own funds (some sources mention ~$300,000 total) and more than twenty years constructing the dinosaurs.

== Death and legacy ==
Bell died on September 19, 1988, in Anaheim, California, from pneumonia, at age 91.

After his death, Bell’s family sold the Cabazon Dinosaurs property in the mid-1990s.

== See also ==
- Cabazon Dinosaurs
- Knott’s Berry Farm
- Roadside attraction
