= Saint Boniface School =

Saint Boniface School may refer to:

- St. Boniface Indian School
- The school of Saint Boniface Church (New Vienna, Iowa)

== See also ==
- Université de Saint-Boniface
