= Gilman Ranch =

Gilman Historic Ranch and Wagon Museum
- Location: Banning, California
- Coordinates: 33°56′23″N 116°54′15″W
- Type: History museum
- Website: Gilman Historic Ranch and Wagon Museum

The Gilman Ranch is a historic ranch and stagecoach station on the Bradshaw Trail, in Riverside County, California, United States. The ranch is best known for its association with the manhunt of Willie Boy, a Paiute Indian who killed the father of Carlota, the woman he was forbidden to marry because they were cousins. They eloped and he shot her father after they returned. The story was popularized by the book, written by Harry Lawton, and subsequent movie, starring Robert Redford and Robert Blake, named "Tell Them Willie Boy Is Here".

The ranch buildings are now protected as the Gilman Historic Ranch and Wagon Museum within the Gilman Ranch Historic Park, located in Banning. Displays include authentic wagons, including an Overland stagecoach, a “prairie schooner” and a chuck wagon, a saddle collection and Western ranching tools and artifacts. The museum and park are operated by Riverside County Parks.

The ranch complex is on the National Register of Historic Places.

== See also ==
- National Register of Historic Places listings in Riverside County, California
- Banning, California−related topics

http://www.temeculahistory.org/publications/TVHS-News/2007%20thru%202012/2011-09_TVHS_Newsletter.pdf
