= Willie Boy (disambiguation) =

Willie Boy was an early 20th-century fugitive from the law in Southern California.

Willie Boy may also refer to:

== Books and film ==
- Willie Boy: a Desert Manhunt, a 1960 novel by Harry Lawton
- Tell Them Willie Boy Is Here, a 1969 film starring Robert Blake and Robert Redford

== People ==
- Wilfred Johnson, FBI informant related to the Gambino crime family

== Songs ==
- Tell' Em Willie Boy's A' Comin, a 1972 single by Tommy James
- Willie Boy, on the 1973 album Act III by The Seldom Scene
- Willie Boy, released in 1979 by Wayne Rostad

== See also ==
- Boy Willie, a character in the 1987 play The Piano Lesson
- Boy Willie, a character in the 1995 film The Piano Lesson
- Willie Boyd, footballer
