= Kevin Swayne =

American football player (born 1975)

No. 4, 82, 3
- Position: Wide receiver

Personal information
- Born: January 17, 1975 (age 51); Riverside, California, U.S.
- Listed height: 6 ft 1 in (1.85 m)
- Listed weight: 191 lb (87 kg)

Career information
- High school: Banning (Banning, California)
- College: Wayne State (NE)
- NFL draft: 1997: undrafted

Career history
- Chicago Bears (1997)*; Iowa Barnstormers (1998–1999); Philadelphia Eagles (1999)*; San Diego Chargers (2000)*; Orlando Rage (2001); New York Dragons (2001); New York Jets (2001–2003); Washington Redskins (2004)*; New York Dragons (2004–2008)
- * Offseason or practice squad member only

Awards and highlights
- First-team All-Arena (2001); All-Rookie Team (1998); Don't Blink! Player of the Year (1999); Al Lucas Hero Team (2008)

Career NFL statistics
- Receptions: 20
- Receiving yards: 310
- Receiving touchdowns: 1
- Stats at Pro Football Reference

Career AFL statistics
- Receptions: 638
- Receiving yards: 8,488
- Receiving touchdowns: 194
- Stats at ArenaFan.com

Kevin Swayne (born January 17, 1975) is an American former professional football player who was a wide receiver in the National Football League (NFL). He played college football for the Wayne State Wildcats. He played professionally for the Iowa Barnstormers/New York Dragons (AFL), New York Jets (NFL) and the Orlando Rage (XFL).

Swayne became the first player to play 52 straight weeks of professional football. In 2001, he played in the NFL, AFL, and XFL all in one year.

== Early life ==
Although born in Riverside, Swayne lived most of his early life in Banning, California. He graduated from Banning High School after earning letters in four sports: basketball, track, cross country, and football.

== Collegiate stats ==
=== Junior college ===
Kevin attended Palomar College in California, near his hometowns of Riverside and Banning. Swayne was a member of the 1993 National Junior Collegiate Championship team.

=== Wayne State ===
In 1994, after his sophomore season at Palomar, Swayne's outstanding performance was noticed by Wayne State College. He signed with them, and became a star for his two years there. Most notably, in a 1996 game (his senior year) against Drake University, he caught a school-record 21 passes for 236 yards. His reception record ranks third all-time in Division II. He had a total of 144 career receptions for 2091 yards. He holds a single-season WSC record with 1273 receiving yards in his 1996 senior campaign and was named an Honorable Mention NCAA Division II All-American. He was inducted into Wayne State's Athletics Hall of Fame in 2002.

== Professional career ==
Swayne went undrafted in the 1997 NFL draft despite his record-setting performances the year before. He was, however, signed to the scout team of the Chicago Bears. He was never activated and was soon released.

Swayne joined the Arena Football League's Iowa Barnstormers in 1998, and was an immediate sensation. He was named the team MVP, was named to the AFL's All-Rookie team, and was given the AFL's "Don't Blink" award for being the League's most exciting player. He led the Barnstormers in points (96) as well as total yards (1,381). In his second season with the Barnstormers, Swayne again led the team in points, but his total was more than double his previous sum, with 206 points in that season alone. He once again led the team in yards (2074) as well as yards per game (148.1). He returned kicks for Iowa in 1999, and led the team with 484 kick return yards and two touchdowns.

He was signed to the Philadelphia Eagles's practice squad in 1999. He accepted an offer to come play for the San Diego Chargers in 2000. He never saw the field, though, as he was cut during training camp.

During most of football's "offseason", Swayne was still playing. The XFL had been started by Vince McMahon, and Swayne was eager to try out. He was given a spot on the Orlando Rage. On February 3, 2001, Swayne caught a Jeff Brohm pass to score the XFL's first touchdown. He was one of the Rage's stars that season, but would never play again in the league. Swayne also played in the Arena League for the newly founded New York Dragons which was really the Iowa Barnstormers moved to New York. He set a new high in receiving yardage, with 1,890 to lead the team for the third straight season. He also set a record for TD receptions in one game, with seven against the Carolina Cobras. He was named First-team All-Arena for 2001. Afterward, the New York Jets offered him a three-year contract. With the Jets, Swayne played in 15 games, starting two, and caught 13 passes for 203 yards. He ranked third on the team in each of the last two categories, and had a generally productive season as the team's slot receiver. He also had one reception for 15 yards in the Jets' playoff game against the Oakland Raiders, which was lost 22–24. With his play in all three leagues, he became the first player in professional football history to play football for 12 consecutive months.

Swayne's third year with the Jets was arguably his best. Although his role with the team became diminished and he only caught two passes, one of those passes was the most important of his career. In a 24–17 win over the Tennessee Titans on Monday Night Football, Swayne caught a 27-yard strike for his only career NFL touchdown. That score was the deciding margin, as the Jets earned a seven-point win. Swayne caught a two-yard pass the next week for his last NFL catch. The Jets decided not to renew Swayne's contract and let him go as a free agent. He was signed by the Washington Redskins on March 26, 2004 and released by the team on April 2.

In his first action with the Dragons since 2001, Swayne was welcomed back. Unfortunately, after a successful first-week return, Swayne missed the next six games with a hamstring injury. In the season finale, however, his presence was felt with two touchdowns in a Dragons win. Swayne only played in six games, but still made an impact. He was fifth on the team in receiving yardage, and had 23 receptions for 11 touchdowns. He passed two important personal milestones on February 19, against the Nashville Kats, scoring both his 100th touchdown and his 500th receiving yard. He scored 5 touchdowns, his season high, in this game as well.

== Personal life ==
Swayne lives in California. He and his wife, Jaime, have two children, Hannah and Ezekiel.

Swayne is an avid Christian who often talks about how his mother taught him the importance of Jesus in his daily life.

== See also ==
- List of Arena Football League and National Football League players
