= Pinball museum =

Pinball Museum may refer to:

== United States ==
- Asheville Pinball Museum, a museum located in Asheville, North Carolina
- Museum of Pinball, a defunct museum in Banning, California
- Next Level Pinball Museum, Hillsboro, Oregon
- Pacific Pinball Museum, a museum in Alameda, California
- Roanoke Pinball Museum, a museum located in Roanoke, Virginia
- Silverball Museum (Delray Beach), Florida
- Silverball Museum, a museum located in Asbury Park, New Jersey
- Seattle Pinball Museum, a museum located in Seattle, Washington

== Other places ==
- Australian Pinball Museum, a museum in Nhill, Victoria, Australia
- Dutch Pinball Museum, a museum in Rotterdam, the Netherlands

== See also ==
- Musée Mécanique, an interactive museum consisting of 20th-century penny arcade games including pinball machines
- Pinball Hall of Fame (disambiguation)
