= PHOF =

PHOF may refer to:

- Phantoms Hall of Fame, American ice hockey
- Pickleball Hall of Fame
- Pinball Hall of Fame (disambiguation)
