= Banning High School (Banning, California) =

Location
- 100 West Westward; Banning, California

Information
- Type: Public High School
- School district: Banning Unified School District
- NCES District ID: 0603840
- NCES School ID: 060384000347
- Teaching staff: 59.40 (FTE)
- Grades: 9–12
- Enrollment: 1,146 (2023-2024)
- Student to teacher ratio: 19.29
- Campus type: Rural: Fringe
- Color
- Athletics: Football, Wrestling, Track and Field, Basketball
- Athletics conference: Desert Valley League
- Team name: Broncos
- Accreditation: Western Association of Schools and Colleges (WASC)
- Website: banninghigh.banning.k12.ca.us

Banning High School is a public high school in Banning, California. It is part of the Banning Unified School District.

== Athletics ==
The Banning Broncos are a member of the Desert Valley League of the CIF Southern Section.

== Notable alumni ==
- Kevin Swayne (Class of 1992) — American football player, played 52 straight weeks of football in 2001 in the NFL, AFL, and XFL
