= Banning Municipal Airport =

City owned airport in Riverside County, California

- IATA: BNG; ICAO: KBNG; FAA LID: BNG

Summary
- Airport type: Public
- Owner: City of Banning
- Serves: Banning, California
- Elevation AMSL: 2,222 ft (677 m)
- Coordinates: 33°55′21″N 116°51′02″W
- Interactive map of Banning Municipal Airport

Runways
Direction	Length		Surface
Direction	ft	m	Surface
8/26	4,955	1,510	Asphalt

Statistics
- Aircraft operations (2020): 5,495
- Based aircraft (2021): 16
- Source: Federal Aviation Administration

Banning Municipal Airport (IATA: BNG, ICAO: KBNG, FAA LID: BNG) is a city-owned airport a mile southeast of Banning, in Riverside County, California.

== Facilities ==
The airport covers 141 acres (57 ha) at an elevation of 2,222 feet (677 m). It has a single asphalt runway, 8/26, measuring 4,955 by 100 feet (1,510 x 30 m).

For the year ending December 31, 2020, the airport recorded 5,495 general aviation operations, averaging 105 per week. As of December 2021, 16 aircraft were based at the airport; 13 single-engine, 2 multi-engine, and 1 helicopter.

== History ==
In 2024, the city of Banning started the process of closing the airport due to the airport being financially unviable

== Incidents ==
On August 6, 2023, during the 2023 California wildfire season, two firefighting helicopters crashed into each other in Cabazon, California, near Banning Airport, having taken off from Hemet-Ryan Airport about fifteen minutes earlier.
