= Paul Apodaca =

American academic

Apodaca with a third grade student

Paul Apodaca (born in Los Angeles, California) is an emeritus associate professor of Anthropology and American Studies at Chapman University.

== Personal background ==
Apodaca was born in Los Angeles and raised in Tustin, California. His father's family were from the eastern side of the Navajo Reservation, of the Ma'ii deeshgiishinii Clan (Jemez Clan), and his mother's family are Mixton. Apodaca received his masters' of arts degree in American Indian studies and his doctorate degree in Folklore and Mythology from University of California, Los Angeles. He was the Outstanding Graduate Student of 1996. Apodaca lives in Orange, California.

== Professional career ==
=== Academic ===
Apodaca is an emeritus associate professor of Anthropology and American Studies at Chapman University and a visiting professor at UCLA. He has worked as a regional advisor to the Smithsonian Institution National Museum of the American Indian (representing the California-Nevada-Utah region).

Apodaca was a curator at the Bowers Museum in Orange County over a period of seventeen years.

In 2008, Apodaca was the Lecturer in Residence at the Southwest Museum of the American Indian, a part of Autry National Center, where he made presentations entitled The Mayan end of the World?, Unravelling the mystery of cogged stones used in early California, and Imagery and reality: the role of American Indians in film and television.

In 2008, Apodaca was a keynote speaker at the University of California Native American Professional Development Conference.

Apodaca recovered and restored once-lost recordings of traditional Agua Caliente tribal leader Joe Patencio, Alvino Siva, and others singing bird songs of Cahuilla oral literature. The collection is archived at the Agua Caliente Cultural Museum in Palm Springs.

=== Cultural advisor ===
Apodaca was a selector for the NMAI Native American Film and Video Festival. He has also been a member of the Native California Network, and a board member for the California Council for the Humanities. He has been employed by the Arizona Commission on the Arts, the Corporation for Public Broadcasting, the California Arts Council, and the City of Los Angeles Cultural Affairs Department.

Apodaca was a consultant on Indian culture and imagery to Knott's Berry Farm and the Walt Disney Company. He was a technical advisor on the television mini-series, Lonesome Dove (1989).

He was a creative consultant for the Disney film, Planes: Fire and Rescue 2004, for which he helped develop the character Windlifter, a heavy-lift helicopter who is portrayed as an American Indian and voiced by actor Wes Studi. Apodaca assisted with design elements on Windlifter’s image, and in a script element in which Windlifter recounts an American Indian folktale of how Coyote was renewed by fire.

Apodaca, Henry Koerper of Cypress College and Jon Erikson of the University of California Irvine, promoted California state legislation that added an 8,000 year old carving of a bear to the list of California state symbols as the official California State Prehistoric Artifact.

=== Editorial advisor ===
Apodaca served as a contributing editor to News from Native California. He has edited the Journal of California and Great Basin Anthropology and has been an adviser for Pearson Scott Foresman publishers. Apodaca serves on the editorial board of Malki Museum Press.

=== Performing artist ===
Apodaca sat in as a spoken word performer with The Dave Brubeck Quartet during the 2009 Brubeck Festival, a commemoration of the 50th anniversary of Brubeck's legendary album, Time Out.

Apodaca also appeared in a special feature segment of the DVD release of the Nicolas Cage film, Knowing (2009) where he discussed the cultural significance of apocalypse myths.

Apodaca performed music for the Academy Award winning film, Broken Rainbow (1986), a documentary film that helped to stop the relocation of twelve thousand Navajos in northern Arizona.

== List of awards ==
- Orange County Human Rights Award 1971
- Native American Journalists Association award 1997 (California tongues: language revival as basis for cultural renaissance in Native Americas Journal, Cornell University, American Indian Program).
- Mary Smith Lockwood National Medal for Education 1999 (from the Daughters of the American Revolution)
- Little Eagle Free Foundation Man of the Year 2007 (sponsored by the family of Walter Knott)
- Honorary Host Committee member (UCLA 40 Years of Ethnic Studies celebration).
- Smithsonian Institution Museum Professional Award.

== Selected bibliography ==
- Apodaca P. and Angelo G. "Gabrielino/Tongva culture" (1991) video.
- Apodaca P. "Permanent sandpainting as an art form" (1991)
- Apodaca P. "Sharing information: the Cahuilla tribe and the Bowers Museum" (1991)
- Apodaca P. "California Indian shamanism and California Indian nights" (1994)
- Apodaca P. and Labbe A. J. "Images of power: masterworks of the Bowers Museum of Cultural Art" (1995)
- Apodaca et al "Archaeological, ethnohistoric, and historic notes regarding ORA-58 and other sites along the Lower Santa Ana River drainage, Costa Mesa" (1996)
- Apodaca P. "Testaments of hope" (1998)
- Apodaca P. "Powerful images: portrayals of Native America" (1998)
- Apodaca P. "Tradition, myth, and performance of Cahuilla bird songs" (1999), doctoral thesis, UCLA.
- Apodaca P. and Madrigal L. "Cahuilla bird songs" (1999)
- Kozak and Lopez "Devil sickness and devil songs: Tohono O'odham poetics" (2001) Review.
- Apodaca P. "Cactus stones: symbolism and representation in Southern California and Seri indigenous folk art and artifacts" (2001)
- Apodaca P. "Hollywood Tragicomedy" (2007)
- Apodaca P. "Under West's wing, NMAI made history" (2008)
- Apodaca P. and Saubel K. S. "Founding a tribal museum: the Malki Museum" (2008)
- Apodaca P. "Native American Art" (2015)
- Apodaca P. "Wikikmal: the birdsong tradition of the Cahuilla Indians" (forthcoming)
