= Rancho San Gorgonio =

Rancho San Gorgonio may refer to:

== Places ==
- Rancho San Gorgonio, a cattle ranch established in the San Gorgonio pass in 1824 by the San Gabriel Mission near Los Angeles
- Rancho San Jacinto y San Gorgonio, an 1843 Mexican Land Grant in Southern California

== See also ==
- San Gorgonio (disambiguation)
