= Banning, California =

City in California, United States

- City
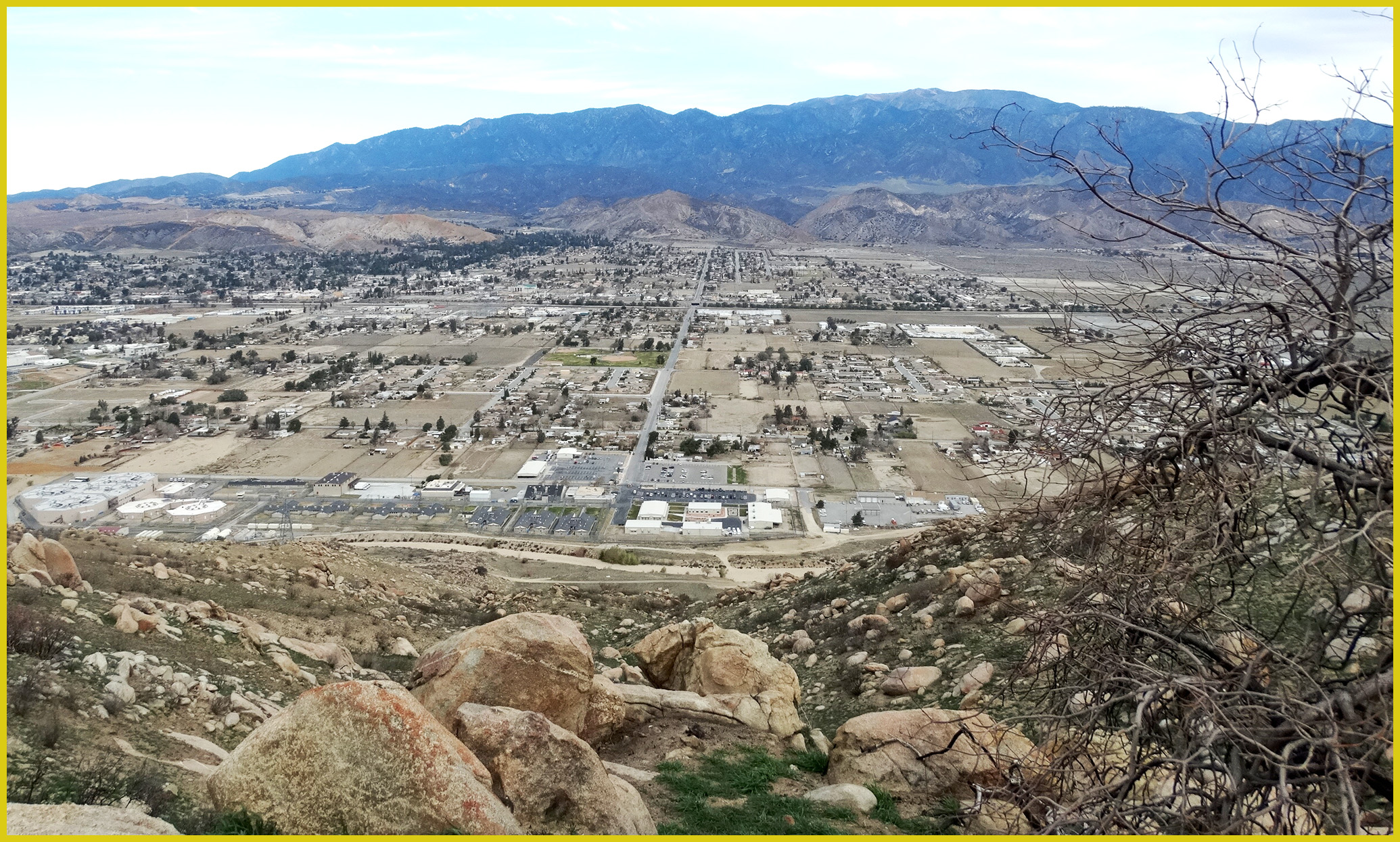
- A view of Banning from Hwy 243

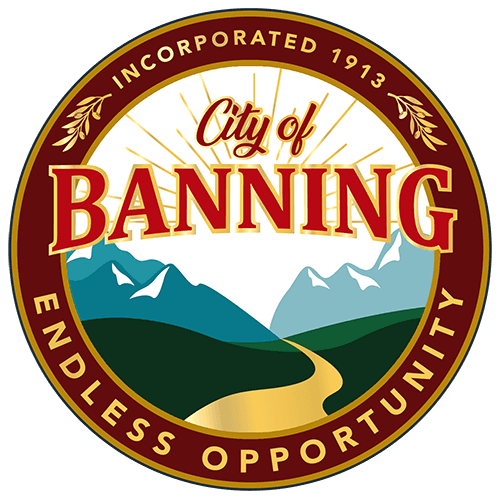
- Seal
- Nickname: "Gateway to the Coachella Valley"
- Motto: "Endless Opportunity"
- Interactive map of Banning, California
- Location in the United States
- Coordinates: 33°55′54″N 116°53′51″W
- Country: United States
- State: California
- County: Riverside
- Incorporated: February 6, 1913

Government
  - Type: Council-Manager
  - Body: Banning City Council: Leroy Miller; Cindy Barrington; Sheri Flynn; Richard Royce; Colleen Wallace
  - Mayor: Sheri Flynn
  - Mayor Pro Tem: Richard Royce
  - Manager: Art Vela (interim)

Area
  - Total: 23.24 sq mi (60.18 km^{2})
  - Land: 23.24 sq mi (60.18 km^{2})
  - Water: 0 sq mi (0.00 km^{2}) 0%
- Elevation: 2,349 ft (716 m)

Population (2020)
  - Total: 29,505
  - Density: 1,269.7/sq mi (490.25/km^{2})
- Time zone: UTC-8 (Pacific)
  - Summer (DST): UTC-7 (PDT)
- ZIP code: 92220
- Area code: 951
- FIPS code: 06-03820
- GNIS feature IDs: 1660306, 2409785
- Website: www.banning.ca.us

Banning is a city in the Inland Empire region of Riverside County, California, United States. Its population was 29,505 as of the 2020 census, down from 29,603 at the 2010 census. It is situated in the San Gorgonio Pass, also known as Banning Pass. It is named for Phineas Banning, stagecoach line owner and the "Father of the Port of Los Angeles."

Banning shares geographic and regional features with its western neighbor, the city of Beaumont. Banning and Beaumont have been rapidly growing in size and population since the 1990s. Both cities are about 80 miles east of downtown Los Angeles and 30 miles west of Palm Springs, both connected by freeway and railroad.

== History ==
=== Etymology ===
Initially named Moore City, by Ransom B. Moore, within only a few months the town was renamed for Phineas Banning, "Father of the Port of Los Angeles", who had pastured sheep in the San Gorgonio Pass area, and operated a stagecoach that ran through the Pass.

=== Early history ===
The area, up to the mid-19th century, was inhabited by the Cahuilla people, though the region around Banning was originally Maringayam (Serrano); the Cahuilla expansion into the pass occurred only late in recent, documented history. In 1824, the Mission San Gabriel Arcángel established the Rancho San Gorgonio in the pass. The first Anglo to settle in the area was Dr. Isaac Smith in 1853. In 1863, a smallpox epidemic further diminished the Cahuilla. The Indian reservations for the Cahuilla were established in 1877.

The settlement that was to become Banning developed in coincidence with the start of the Colorado River Gold Rush. The Bradshaw Trail, which passed through the area in 1862, was a wagon road to the gold boomtowns of the Arizona Territory. Gilman's Ranch, north of downtown, served as a station for the stagecoach lines on this road. The railroad followed, passing through the town in 1876. The Southern Pacific (later purchased by Union Pacific) railroad was a major contributor to the area's growth. U.S. Route 99 was built in 1923, followed by U.S. Route 60/70 in 1936, and subsequently Interstate 10.

Banning borders the Morongo Indian Reservation, home to the Morongo Band of Cahuilla (Mission) Indians. Relations with reservation residents have been strained by disputes over water rights. Dorothy Ramon's book Always Believe (published 2000) depicts a Maringayam's views on Banning and reservation life.

Prior to the name Banning, the settlement was called Moore City. Ransom B. Moore operated a large cattle ranch and was later a member of the Los Angeles County Board of Supervisors, settling in the area and nearby San Gorgonio mountains in the early 1860s. Moore sold his holdings and relocated to central Arizona in 1883.

The town of Banning was incorporated on February 6, 1913.

=== Almond production ===
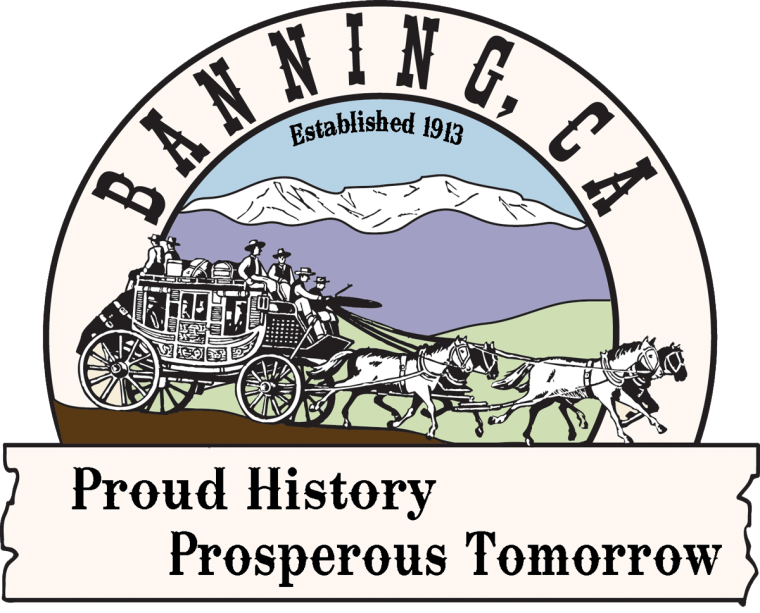
The old seal of Banning, pre 2019

In the early 20th century, the area immediately around Banning was considered well fitted to almond culture, and was known as the oldest almond growing district in southern California.

=== Indian School and cemetery ===
The St. Boniface Indian Industrial School was opened in 1890, providing vocational education to Cahuilla, Serrano, Luiseño, Kumeyaay, and other American Indians. Bishop Francisco Mora y Borrell authorized the school and Mother Katharine Drexel provided funding to the Bureau of Catholic Indian Missions for purchase of the land, construction, and operations. Over its history, about 8,000 students attended the school which was demolished in 1974. A small abandoned cemetery remains.

=== World War II ===
During World War II, Banning was the site of the 1,000-bed Banning General Hospital. It supported training at the Desert Training Center and was later used as a naval convalescent hospital. The facilities were dismantled in 1948.

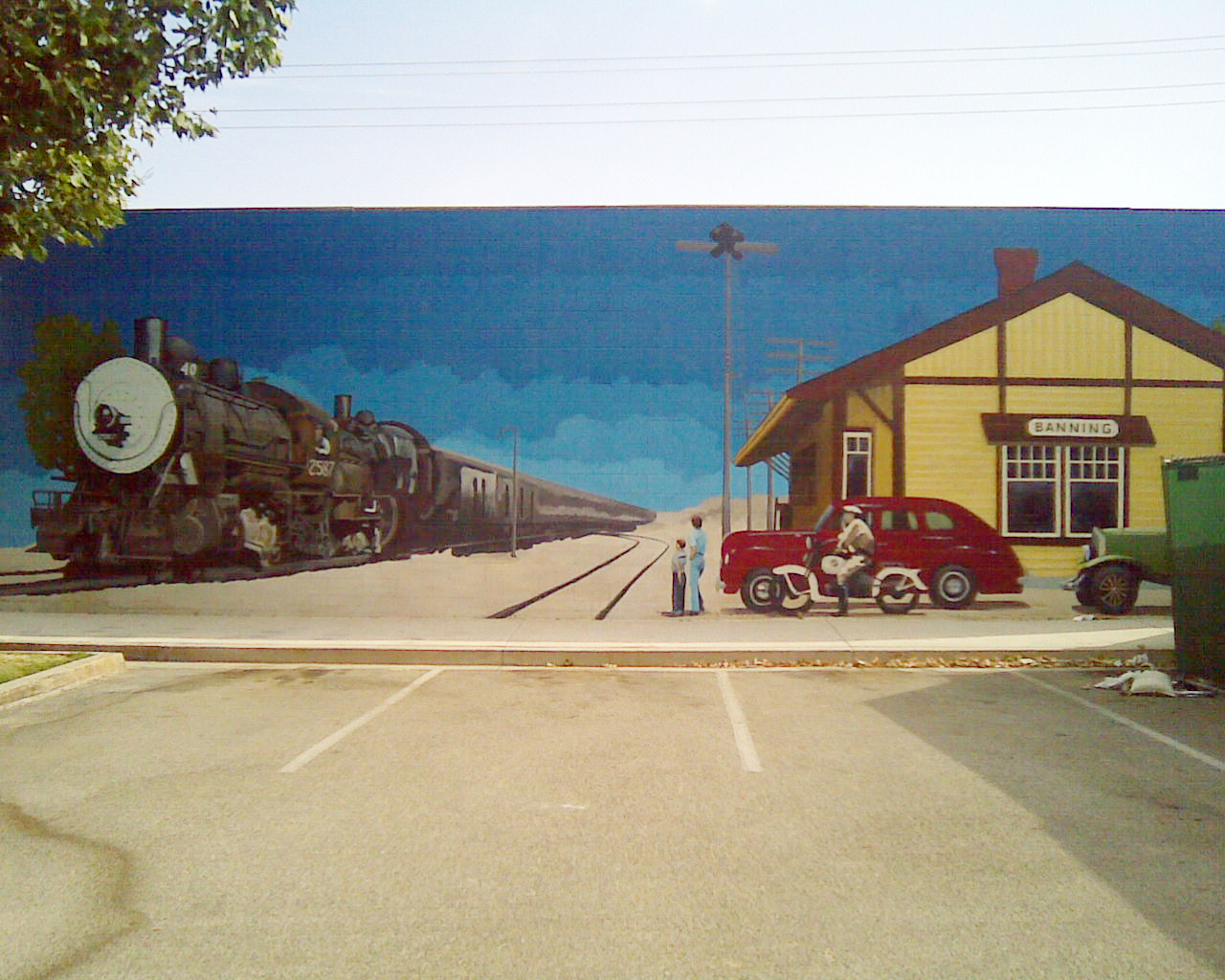
City of Banning, public art

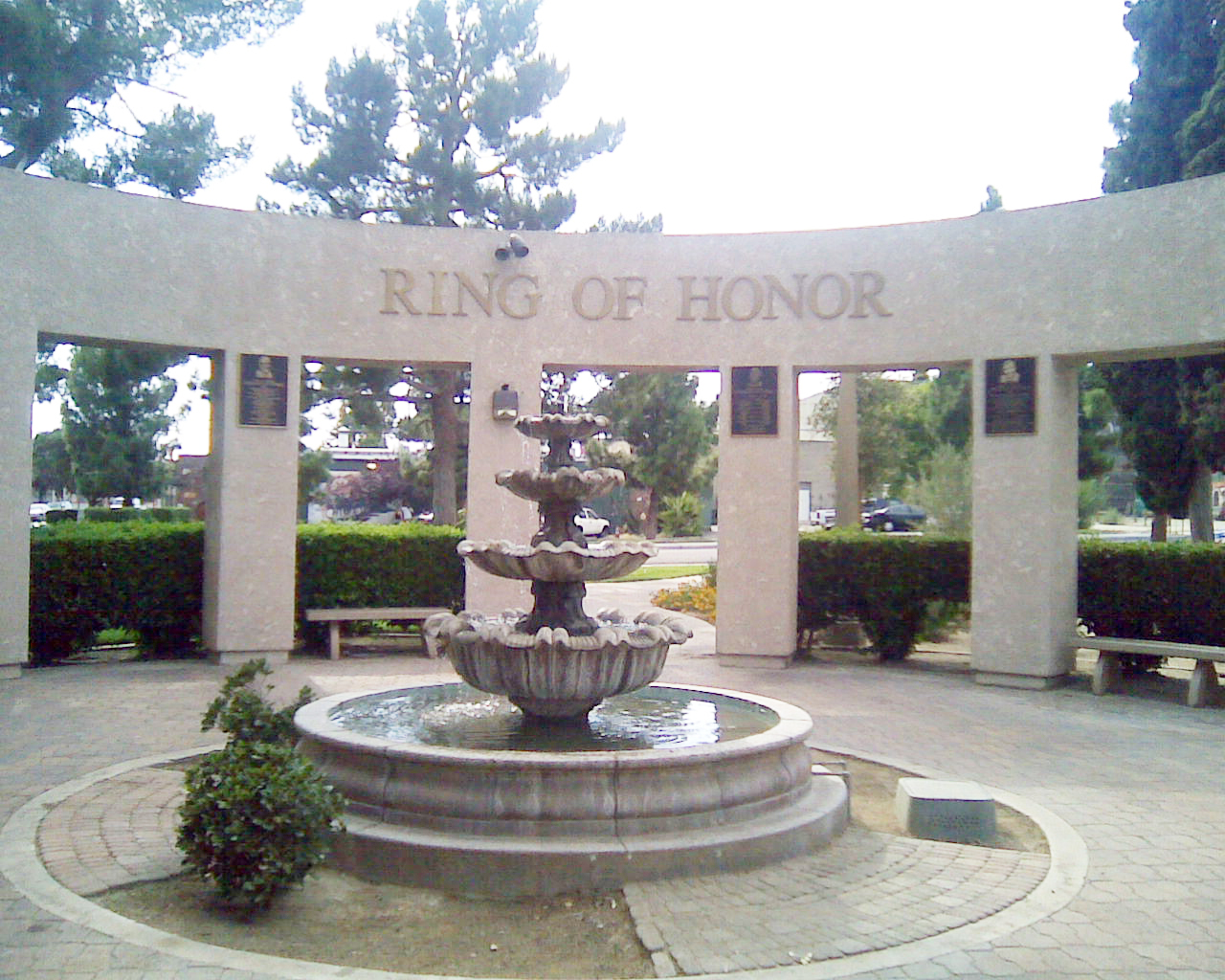
City of Banning Ring of Honor

In 1942 the citizens of Banning raised funds for the purchase of an M3 Stuart tank to support the war effort. After the war the tank was given to the South African Defence Force. The tank, named "City of Johannesburg", is preserved at a local museum in Richmond, Natal Province, South Africa.

== Geography ==
Banning is located at 33°55′54″N 116°53′51″W (33.931729, -116.897557).

According to the United States Census Bureau, the city has a total area of 23.1 square miles (60 km^{2}), all of it land.

Banning's elevation is approximately 2,300 feet (700 m) above sea level, which gives it a cooler climate in contrast to the county seat of Riverside at 800 feet (240 m) above sea level and the Coachella Valley of the Colorado Desert to the east.

Banning is traversed by the San Andreas Fault which created the pass in which the city is situated.

Banning is 25 miles (40 km) west of Palm Springs and 100 miles (160 km) east of Los Angeles.

=== Climate ===
According to the Köppen Climate Classification system, Banning has a warm-summer Mediterranean climate, abbreviated "Csa" on climate maps.

== Demographics ==
=== Racial and ethnic composition ===
Race / Ethnicity (NH = Non-Hispanic)	Pop 1980	Pop 1990	Pop 2000	Pop 2010	Pop 2020	% 1980	% 1990	% 2000	% 2010	% 2020
White alone (NH)	9,329	12,257	12,354	12,858	10,964	66.54%	59.59%	52.43%	43.43%	37.16%
Black or African American alone (NH)	1,775	1,859	1,915	2,023	2,112	12.66%	9.04%	8.13%	6.83%	7.16%
Native American or Alaska Native alone (NH)	264	308	376	365	316	1.88%	1.50%	1.60%	1.23%	1.07%
Asian alone (NH)	73	1,328	1,250	1,510	1,697	0.52%	6.46%	5.31%	5.10%	5.76%
Native Hawaiian or Pacific Islander alone (NH)	73	1,328	18	34	26	0.52%	6.46%	0.08%	0.11%	0.09%
Other race alone (NH)	48	42	31	32	117	0.34%	0.20%	0.13%	0.11%	0.40%
Mixed race or Multiracial (NH)	x	x	499	600	846	x	x	2.12%	2.03%	2.87%
Hispanic or Latino (any race)	2,531	4,776	7,119	12,181	13,427	18.05%	23.22%	30.21%	41.15%	45.51%
Total	14,020	20,570	23,562	29,603	29,505	100.00%	100.00%	100.00%	100.00%	100.00%

Historical population
Census	Pop.	Note	%±
1930	2,752		—
1940	3,874		40.8%
1950	7,034		81.6%
1960	10,250		45.7%
1970	12,034		17.4%
1980	14,020		16.5%
1990	20,570		46.7%
2000	23,562		14.5%
2010	29,603		25.6%
2020	29,505		−0.3%
U.S. Decennial Census

=== 2020 census ===
As of the 2020 census, Banning had a population of 29,505 and a population density of 1,269.7 inhabitants per square mile (490.2/km^{2}). The census reported that 98.8% of residents lived in households, 0.5% lived in non-institutionalized group quarters, and 0.7% were institutionalized.

The median age was 45.0 years; 21.0% of residents were under the age of 18, 7.1% were from 18 to 24, 21.8% were from 25 to 44, 22.0% were from 45 to 64, and 28.1% were 65 years of age or older. For every 100 females there were 90.0 males, and for every 100 females age 18 and over there were 85.8 males.

Overall, 95.3% of residents lived in urban areas, while 4.7% lived in rural areas.

There were 11,256 households in Banning; 27.1% had children under the age of 18 living in them, 43.0% were married-couple households, 6.9% were cohabiting couple households, 16.9% were households with a male householder and no spouse or partner present, and 33.2% were households with a female householder and no spouse or partner present. About 29.7% of all households were made up of individuals and 20.7% had someone living alone who was 65 years of age or older. The average household size was 2.59. There were 7,254 families (64.4% of all households).

There were 11,961 housing units at an average density of 514.7 units per square mile (198.7 units/km^{2}), of which 5.9% were vacant. Of the occupied housing units, 67.4% were owner-occupied and 32.6% were occupied by renters. The homeowner vacancy rate was 1.7% and the rental vacancy rate was 4.9%.

Racial composition as of the 2020 census
Race	Number	Percent
White	13,658	46.3%
Black or African American	2,278	7.7%
American Indian and Alaska Native	722	2.4%
Asian	1,779	6.0%
Native Hawaiian and Other Pacific Islander	28	0.1%
Some other race	7,023	23.8%
Two or more races	4,017	13.6%

=== 2023 estimates ===
In 2023, the US Census Bureau estimated that 18.3% of the population were foreign-born. Of all people aged 5 or older, 63.7% spoke only English at home, 30.7% spoke Spanish, 2.2% spoke other Indo-European languages, 3.1% spoke Asian or Pacific Islander languages, and 0.3% spoke other languages. Of those aged 25 or older, 82.1% were high school graduates and 17.4% had a bachelor's degree.

The median household income was $57,699, and the per capita income was $31,352. About 15.5% of families and 19.0% of the population were below the poverty line.

== Arts and culture ==
=== Events ===
Banning Stagecoach Days has been held annually since 1957 in recognition of the city's historic ties to the original stagecoach line that passed through the area in the late 1800s, and because the city's namesake, Phineas Banning, was himself a stagecoach operator. Currently, each year the event is operated by the non-profit "Stagecoach Days Association", and held at the AC Dysart Equestrian Park in Banning.

=== Official song ===
The city has an official song written by Jimmy Francis. The song was selected on October 24, 1941 by representatives of various civic groups of the city.

=== Points of Interest ===
- Gilman Ranch Historic Park
  - Gilman Historic Ranch and Wagon Museum

== Government ==
Banning vote by party in presidential elections
Year	Democratic	Republican	Third Parties
2024	47.07% 5,935	50.50% 6,367	2.43% 306
2020	50.20% 6,312	47.77% 6,006	2.03% 255
2016	46.26% 4,728	49.21% 5,030	4.53% 463
2012	46.90% 4,575	51.43% 5,016	1.67% 163
2008	46.61% 4,854	51.56% 5,369	1.82% 190
2004	42.28% 4,353	56.84% 5,852	0.87% 90
2000	47.51% 4,012	49.46% 4,176	3.03% 256
1996	46.42% 3,539	43.89% 3,346	9.69% 739
1992	44.17% 3,488	36.06% 2,848	19.77% 1,561

=== City ===
Banning is a general law city as opposed to a charter city. The elected government consists of the Banning City Council which operates under a council-manager government. Richard Royce was appointed as Mayor and Cindy Barrington as Mayor Pro Tem as of January 2026. There are 5 city council districts. The current interim City Manager is Art Vela, who assumed the position after the city council voted to place the previous City Manager, Doug Schulze, on leave.

The city has departments and appointed officers, including the Banning Police Department (BPD).

=== Federal and state representation ===
In the California State Legislature, Banning is in the 19th senatorial district, represented by Republican Rosilicie Ochoa Bogh, and in the 47th Assembly district, represented by Republican Greg Wallis.

In the United States House of Representatives, Banning is in California's 25th congressional district, represented by Democrat Raul Ruiz.

== Public services ==
=== Safety ===
Banning has had its own police force since shortly after its 1913 incorporation, and for many years also had a regional station of the Riverside County Sheriff's Department (which has moved eastward to neighboring Cabazon). The Beaumont, Palm Springs, Cathedral City, and Desert Hot Springs Police Departments also provide assistance in a major emergency, as well as the California Highway Patrol out of the Beaumont regional station. Additionally, the Morongo Tribal Police Department also serves the Morongo Reservation and surrounding communities.

The city of Banning contracts for fire and paramedic services with the Riverside County Fire Department through a cooperative agreement with CAL FIRE.

=== Education ===
Most of Banning is within Banning Unified School District while a portion of it, along with most of nearby Beaumont, is within the Beaumont Unified School District. Schools in the Banning USD are:

- Banning High School
- Cabazon Elementary
- Central Elementary
- Coombs Alternative Education
- Hemmerling Elementary
- Hoffer Elementary
- New Horizons High (Independent Studies)
- Nicolet Middle

The city is served by Mt. San Jacinto College, a regional community college whose San Gorgonio Pass Campus is located within the city.

Former school:

- St. Boniface Indian School

=== Transportation ===
Banning is served by Interstate 10, which connects the city to Los Angeles in the west and the Coachella Valley in the east. The northern terminus of State Route 243, which runs south to Idyllwild and Mountain Center, is located in the city.

City-owned Banning Municipal Airport, FAA designator: BNG, has a 5,200-foot (1,600 m) runway.

City-owned Pass Transit operates three fixed-route buses. SunLine Transit Agency provides service to Palm Desert and Riverside. Riverside Transit Agency provides connecting service to Hemet and Moreno Valley.

=== Health care ===
San Gorgonio Memorial Hospital is a General Acute Care Hospital in Banning with Basic Emergency Services as of 2005.

=== Cemetery ===
The Summit Cemetery District operates the San Gorgonio Memorial Park, which was originally established in 1931 as the Banning-Cabazon Cemetery District. Notable burials include Medal of Honor recipient William Powers Morris.

=== Library ===
The Banning Library District operates the Banning Public Library, which was established in 1916 as the Banning Unified School District Library District and became an independent special district in 2005.

== In popular culture ==
- The protagonist in the 1950 film noir D.O.A. Frank Bigelow, played by Edmond O'Brien, is an accountant and notary from Banning.
- Location shooting for the films Buckshot John (1915), Fatherhood (1915), Tell Them Willie Boy Is Here (1969), Sky Below, Crowd Above: The Art Scholl Story (1984), How to Make an American Quilt (1995), Follow Me Home (1996), Evil on Queen Street (2002) and The Last Manhunt (2022) took place in Banning.
- Willie Boy: A Desert Manhunt, was a 1960 novel written by Harry Lawton, and subsequently made into the film Tell Them Willie Boy Is Here, starring Robert Redford and Robert Blake. The book and movie were based on the true story of the manhunt for the fugitive Willie Boy, a Paiute Indian who killed the father of Lola, the woman he wished to marry. Much of the story is centered around the historic Gilman Ranch located in Banning.

== Notable residents ==
- Johnny Longden
- Sally Sweetland
- Earl Palmer
- John Doucette
