= Cabazon Dinosaurs =

Roadside sculptures in California

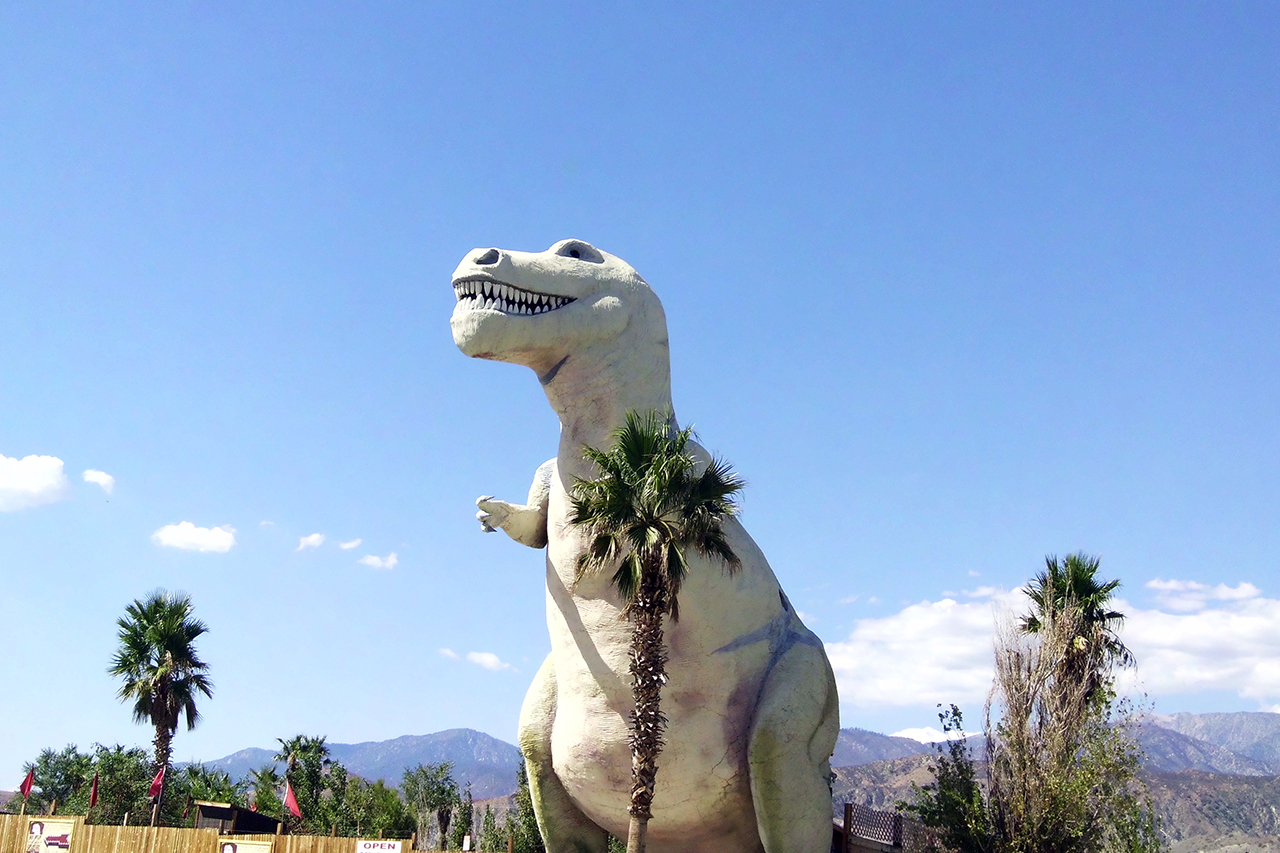
- Interactive map of the Cabazon Dinosaurs area

General information
- Architectural style: Novelty architecture
- Location: Cabazon, California, United States
- Coordinates: 33°55′13″N 116°46′22″W
- Construction started: 1964 (Dinny) / 1981 (Mr. Rex)
- Completed: 1975 (Dinny) / 1986 (Mr. Rex)
- Cost: $300,000 (Dinny)

Design and construction
- Architect: Claude K. Bell
- Structural engineer: Gerald Hufstetler

Cabazon Dinosaurs, formerly Claude Bell's Dinosaurs, is a roadside attraction in Cabazon, California, featuring two enormous, steel-and-concrete dinosaurs named Dinny the Dinosaur and Mr. Rex. Located just west of Palm Springs, California, the 150-foot-long (46 m) Brontosaurus and the 65-foot-tall (20 m) Tyrannosaurus rex are visible from the freeway to travelers passing by on Southern California's Interstate 10. The roadside dinosaurs are best known for their appearance in the film Pee-wee's Big Adventure (1985).

Sculptor and theme park artist Claude Bell began construction of the dinosaurs in 1964 with the goal of attracting more customers to his nearby restaurant, the Wheel Inn (open from 1958 to 2013). Dinny and Mr. Rex were completed in 1975 and 1986, respectively. Bell died in 1988 at age 91 and his family sold the property in the mid-1990s. The new ownership turned the attraction into a roadside creationist museum in 2005, but creationist material has since been removed.

== Background ==
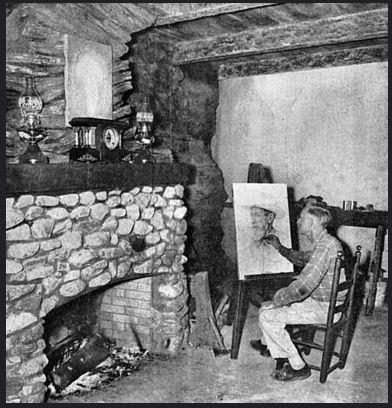
Claude Bell in his new Artist's Studio at Knott's Berry Farm, drawing Ed Strouse, Feb. 1954. Bell sculpted the fireplace, mantel, and relief of Mark Twain.

Claude K. Bell (1896–1988) began his artistic career as a teenager, sculpting teddy bears in the sand on the beach at Atlantic City, New Jersey, in front of a wooden building that was shaped like an elephant. Tips from passersby encouraged him, and before long, he was making a living with his sand sculptures at state and county fairs across the country.

In 1947, Walter Knott hired him to create concrete sculptures of figures sitting on the benches at Knott's Berry Farm. Bell also operated the portrait studio at Knott's from 1951 to 1986. He, his wife, and his daughter, Wendy, all worked there creating portraits of guests.

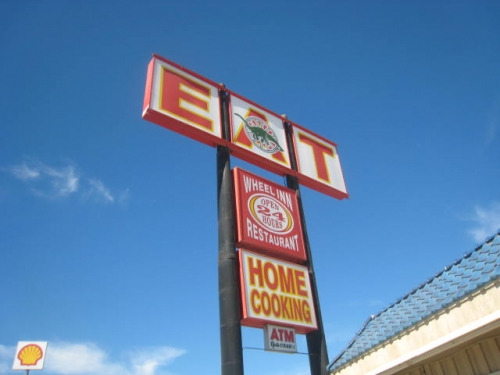
The Wheel Inn Restaurant

The site of the dinosaurs was purchased by Claude Bell in 1946 for $5,000 (equivalent to $75,034 in 2022). The land was leveled for him free of charge, as part of an agreement to let the state remove the gravel for the development of an overpass on the freeway. Bell began living part-time on the land in 1952, and opened the Wheel Inn there in 1958.

== History ==
Dinny, 1977

Bell began construction of his first dinosaur, Dinny the Brontosaurus, in 1964. He took inspiration from a childhood visit to the Atlantic City Boardwalk, where he saw Lucy the Elephant: "From then on I decided someday I would build something big like that elephant house." Steel and cement for the project were salvaged from the freeway, after a flash flood rendered them unusable for official state construction. Bell was allowed to remove the materials in exchange for clearing them from state property.

The biomorphic building was first erected as steel framework over which an expanded metal grid was formed in the shape of a dinosaur. Bell worked with engineer Ralph Titus to weld steel girders into the "ribs" of the dinosaur and then to wrap the structure with wire to form the shape of the skin. According to Bell, "Everything is shaped in wire — wrinkles in the neck, muscles in the legs." The wire was then sprayed with coats of shotcrete.

Bell was quoted in 1970 as saying the 45-foot-high (14 m), 150-foot-long (46 m) Dinny was "the first dinosaur in history, so far as I know, to be used as a building." His original vision for Dinny was for the dinosaur's eyes to glow and mouth to spit fire at night, predicting, "It'll scare the dickens out of a lot of people driving up over the pass."

Dinny was completed in 1975. At the time, the total cost of the project was estimated to be over $100,000 (equivalent to $543,847 in 2022). In 1986 Bell gave an estimated cost of $250,000 (equivalent to $667,426 in 2022). A 1999 article cited a cost of $300,000 (equivalent to $527,008 in 2022)

Bell had plans to construct a second dinosaur, a Tyrannosaurus rex, as early as 1970. "It's taken so long for this first one," he said, "because Ralph and I had to make our own special machinery – steel benders, an elevator out of an old truck, stuff like that--to get started. From here on it will be smooth sailing. We'll have our second dinosaur up and finished a year after the first one's completed." Scaffolding for the second sculpture could be seen to the north of Dinny by November 1980. A year later, the structure and wire frame were complete and ready for cement. The Tyrannosaurus sculpture was designed with a channel in the tail, so as to incorporate a slide. However, by 1986, Bell was concerned the incline would be too steep to use safely.

The 1985 comedy film Pee-wee's Big Adventure filmed several scenes around the dinosaurs. Following the death of Pee-wee Herman's portrayer Paul Reubens in 2023, Mister Rex was temporarily repainted to feature the character's famous grey tuxedo with red bow tie.

A third woolly mammoth sculpture and a prehistoric garden were drafted but never completed due to Bell's death in 1988.

== Creationist museum ==
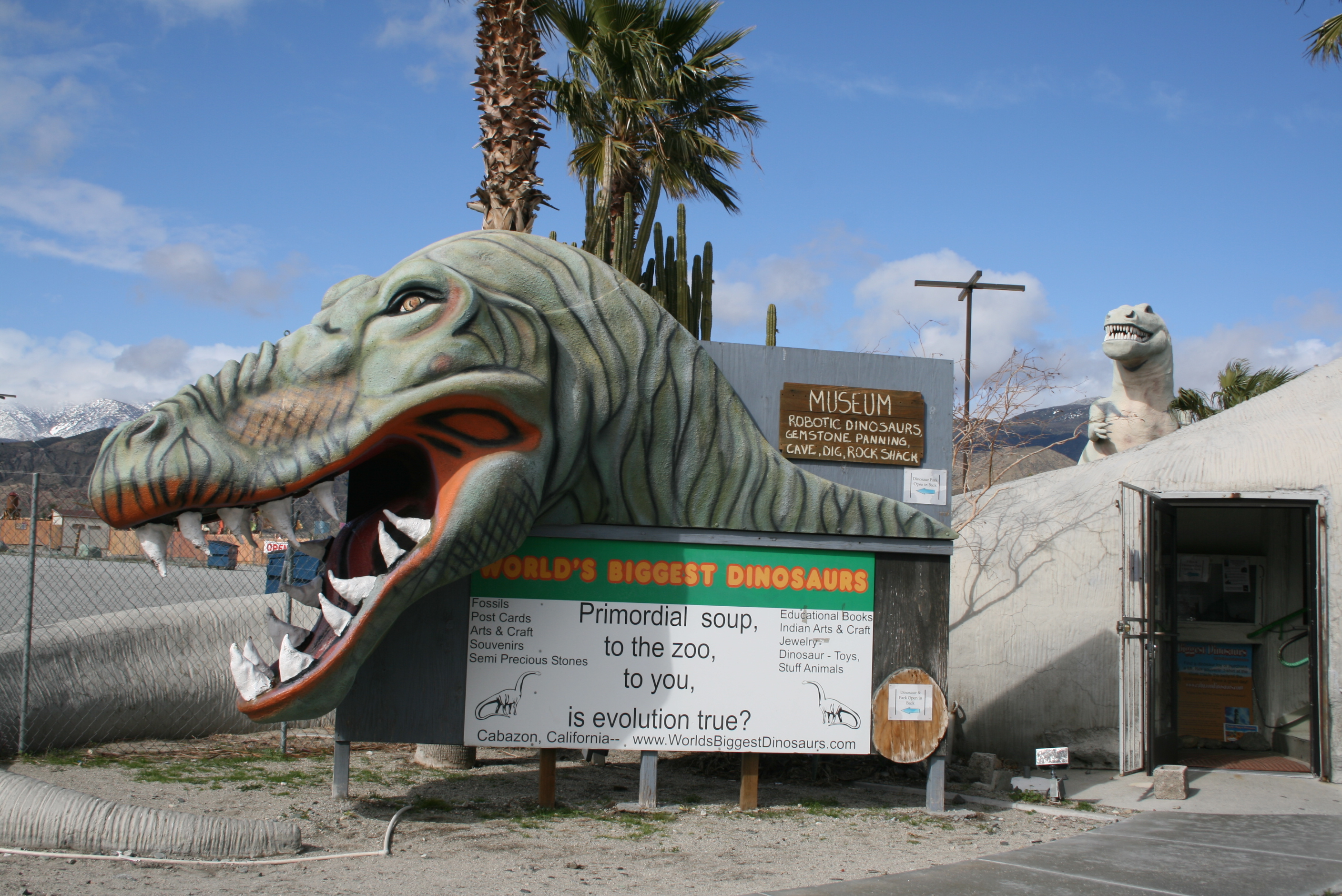
Sign at the entrance to the creation museum, 2009

Following Bell's death, his wife Anna Marie sought to fulfill his goal of developing an amusement park. In 1992, plans were announced for a 60-acre attraction called Dinosaur Village, featuring 12 animated dinosaurs in addition to the existing sculptures. Other amenities were to include an arcade, children's rides, and a theater for simulator ride programming. However, these plans failed to materialize, and by 1995 the property had been purchased by Gary Kanter of Minkoff and Kanter Associates.

MKA Partnership obtained approval for an expansion of the Cabazon dinosaur site in 1996, including land-use approvals for restaurants, a museum, a gift shop, and a 60-room motel at the Main Street exit in Cabazon. Orange County developer and MKA partner Gary Kanter said the original vision has been for MKA to transform the area into a children's science museum.

In December 2004, Kanter's wife Denise posted to the website Revolution Against Evolution, announcing plans to build a museum at the site to promote young Earth creationism. Plans for the museum called for a replica of Noah's Ark, a maze, a giant sand pit, and an exhibit presenting arguments for and against evolution. The Kanters and pastor Robert Darwin Chiles hoped to emulate the Museum of Creation and Earth History, which falsely equates Darwinism with communism, Nazism, and racism.

By 2005, the gift store inside Dinney had begun selling toy dinosaurs labeled "Don't swallow it! The fossil record does not support evolution," and T-shirts reading "By Design and Not By Chance." Visiting the site in 2008, creationism critic Troy Britain reported the installation of new dinosaur sculptures, as well as signage promoting creationist talking points. Bell's frescoes depicting human evolution were left intact, despite inscriptions that are incompatible with the young Earth time scale (e.g., "Peking Man 200,000 [years ago]"). However, posters were put up stating creationist claims that dispute the validity of archaic human fossils.

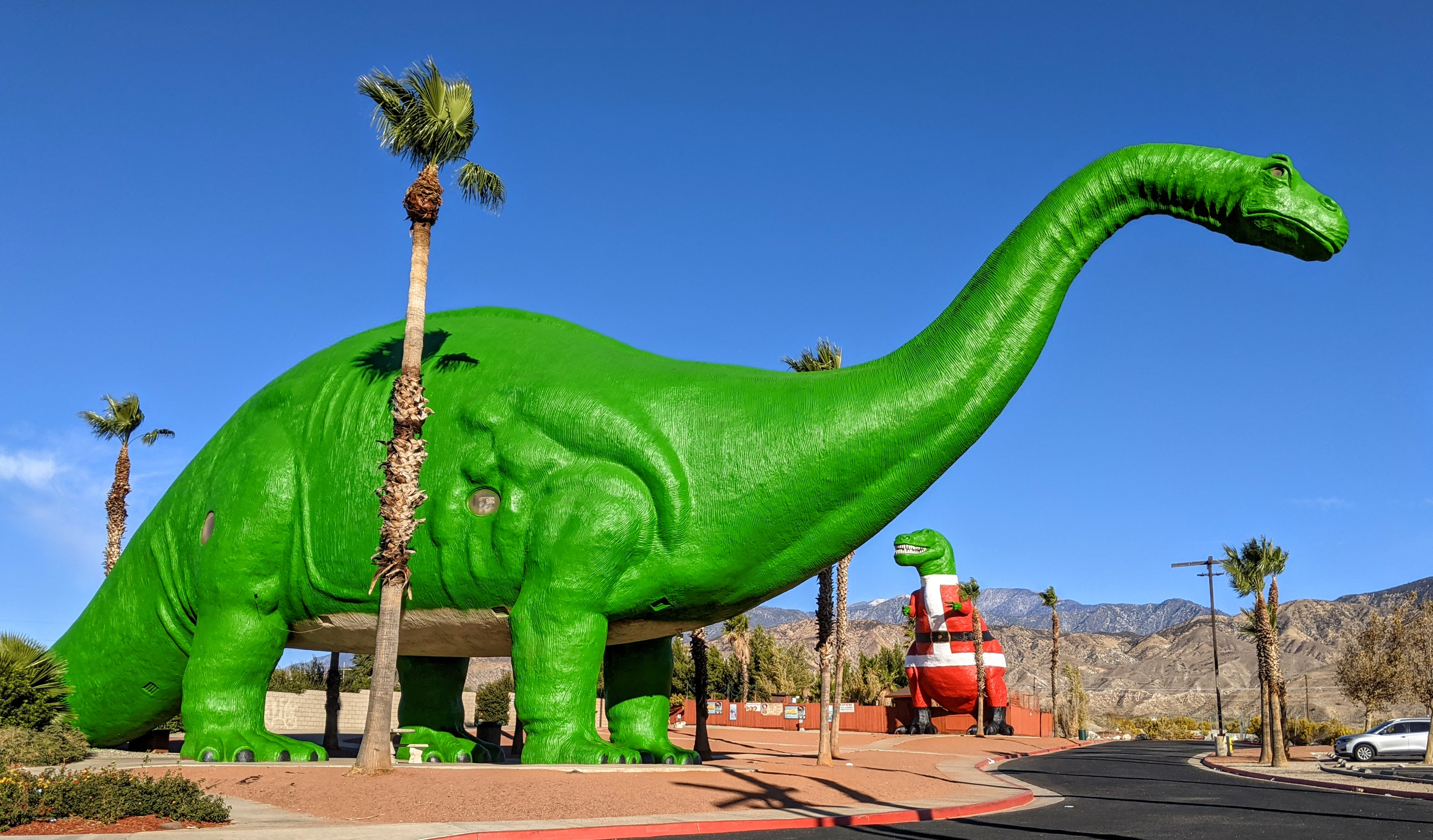
Cabazon Dinosaurs decorated for Christmas, fall 2020

The Cabazon Dinosaurs attraction also features an open-air museum with fiberglass and robotic dinosaurs. Other activities at the site include a sand pit where visitors can experience a "dino dig". Since 2017, visitors to the site have reported that the creationist material has been removed from the attraction. Despite these changes, the Kanters continued to own and operate the site as of 2021.

== See also ==
- List of dinosaur parks
- Novelty architecture
- Wall Drug – a tourist attraction and shopping mall in South Dakota which features an 80-foot concrete dinosaur
