= Native American Film and Video Festival =

Former film festival in New York City

The Native American Film and Video Festival was a noncompetitive showcase of film, video and audio productions. It was held biennially in New York City from 1997 to 2011. Each festival screened between 50 and 80 documentaries, short features and animations, introduced by their producers and members of the Native communities represented. Works to be featured in a given festival were chosen by a team of selectors made up of media makers and cultural activists from among indigenous peoples of the Americas and the program staff of the Film and Video Center of the Smithsonian Institution National Museum of the American Indian. Selectors included indigenous film makers such as Chris Eyre, Randy Redroad, and Nora Naranjo Morse, and Native American cultural experts and academics such as G. Peter Jemison, Beverly Singer, and Paul Apodaca.

Founded in 1979, the Festival was internationally recognized as the first to feature Native productions from throughout the Americas and the Arctic Circle; indigenous media makers participated from Bolivia, Brazil, Canada, Chile, El Salvador, Mexico, and the United States (including Hawaii).
