= St. Boniface Indian School =

St. Boniface Indian School was a Roman Catholic American Indian School in Banning, California.

It belonged to the Roman Catholic Diocese of Monterey-Los Angeles. It opened in 1890, providing vocational education to Cahuilla, Serrano, Luiseño, Kumeyaay, and other American Indians.

The school had a forced Americanization program that was to make students follow Euro-American culture. There is a cemetery that has graves of deceased students.

== History ==
It began operations in 1890. Bishop Francisco Mora y Borrell authorized the school and Mother Katharine Drexel provided funding to the Bureau of Catholic Indian Missions for purchase of the land, construction, and operations. Over its history, about 8,000 students attended the school. Sisters of St. Joseph of Carondelet provided the teaching staff.

The inspiration for the school's main building was the facility of the St. Joseph's Indian Normal School in Rensselaer, Indiana.

St. Anthony's Industrial School in San Diego in 1907, with students sent to St. Boniface.

Its role as an Indian school ended in 1952. The replacement institution, New Hope USA, was for adjudicated delinquents and students from low income backgrounds.

The building was demolished in 1974. A small abandoned cemetery remains.

== See also ==
- American Indian boarding school gravesites
