= San Gorgonio Inn =

Coordinates: 33.925°N 116.875°W

The San Gorgonio Inn was Banning, California's first hotel and was built by George W. Bryant and C. W. Filkins. Originally called the Bryant House, it was built in the Winter of 1884–85. In 1889, the hotel ownership passed to Captain and Mrs. Thomas E. Fraser, and was renamed “The Banning.” The Inn originally served the Railroad trade but as time progressed the focus was on the tourist trade brought by the new Hwy 99. The Original entrance faced south towards the Train Station but was later located on the north side facing the highway. A new owner, John Livacich, bought “The Banning” and named it the “San Gorgonio Inn” in 1923. Livacich added bungalows, used as lodging for tourists.

Located at 150 East Ramsey Street, the inn flourished with the construction of U.S. Route 99 (now known as Ramsey Street) and Interstate 10. It remained a popular fine dining restaurant until 1984 when the owners died. The Inn was inherited by the Head Chef, who ran it for a few years before leasing it and it subsequently became a gentlemen's club which failed.

A neon Googie-styled sign from the 1950s pointed the way to the parking lot from the Ramsey Street entrance, but on August 31, 2011 it was taken down.

In April 2011, the Inn was demolished, more than 100 years after it opened.
