= Banning Unified School District =

Public school district in Riverside County, California

Address
- 161 West Williams Street Banning, California, 92220; United States

District information
- Type: Public
- Grades: K–12
- Superintendent: Robert Guillen
- NCES District ID: 0603840

Students and staff
- Students: 4,440 (2020–2021)
- Teachers: 194.38 (FTE)
- Staff: 268.09 (FTE)
- Student–teacher ratio: 22.84:1

Other information
- Website: www.banning.k12.ca.us

Banning Unified School District is located in the central part of Riverside County in California. The district services the vast majority of the city of Banning, California (aside from a small residential neighborhood in the northwest of the city), as well as the census-designated places of Cabazon and Whitewater. The Morongo Band of Mission Indians's reservation overlaps with this school district, although not all children from the reservation attend Banning schools.

It is composed of one high school, one middle school, four elementary schools and one alternative education center.

== Schools ==
=== Elementary schools ===
- Cabazon Elementary – Principal, Jonny Baker
- Central Elementary – Principal, Marcia Cole
- Hemmerling Elementary – Principal, Alisha Norman
- Hoffer Elementary – Coordinator, Matt Beilstein

=== Middle school ===
- Nicolet Middle School – Principal, Kelly Daly

=== High school ===
- Banning High School (BHS) Broncos – Principal, Matt Valdivia

=== Alternative Education Centers ===
- Coombs Alternative Education School- Acting Coordinator, David Sanchez

== Current School Board Trustees ==
- Alfredo Andrade, President
- Jason Smith, Clerk
- Kerri Mariner, Member
- George Moyer, Provisional Member
- Alex Cassadas, Member
