= Bonnie Bell, California =

Bonnie Bell
- Unincorporated community
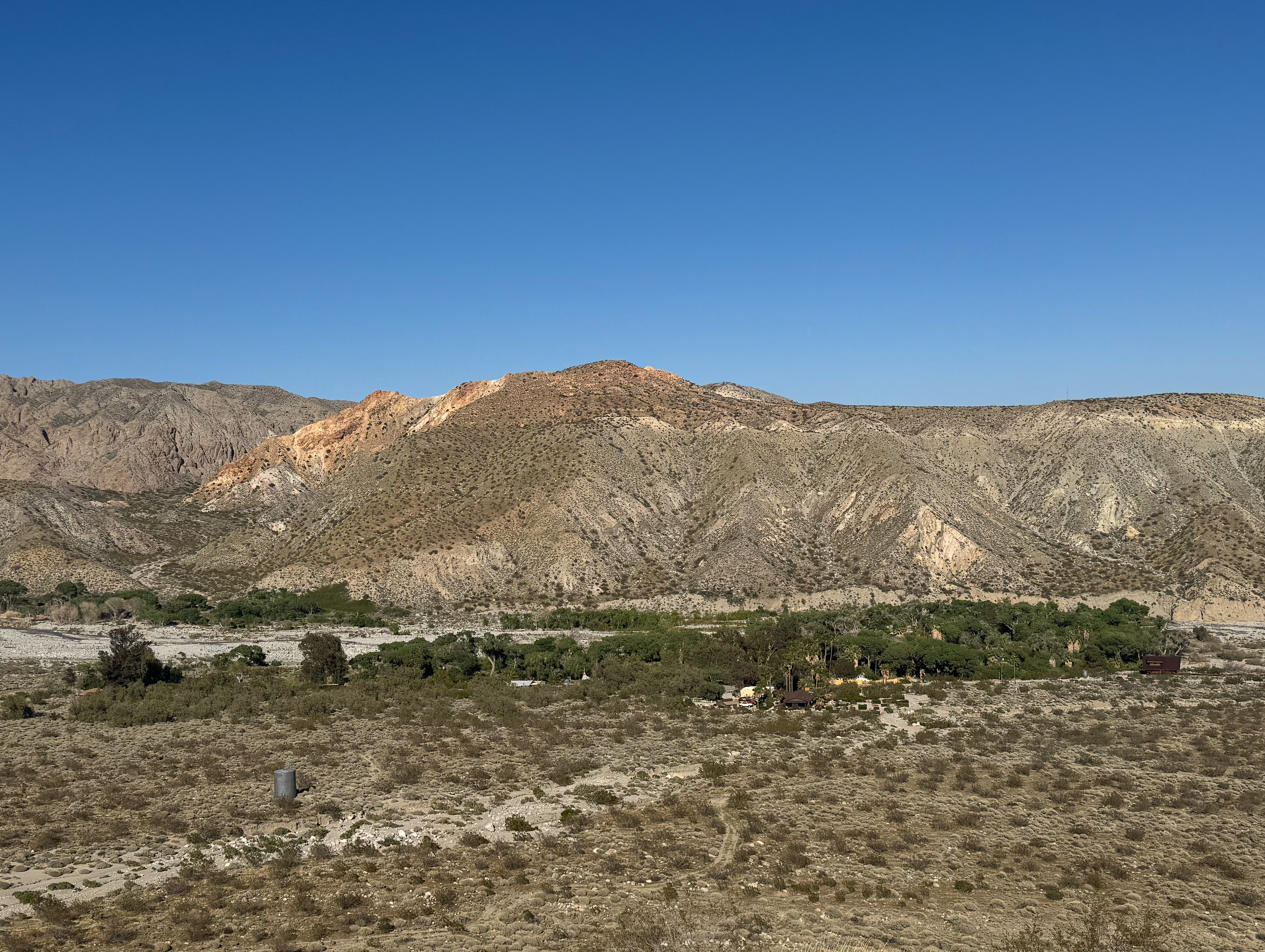
- Bonnie Bell and Whitewater River

- Location in California Bonnie Bell (the United States)
- Coordinates: 33.9488°N 116.6431°W
- Country: United States
- State: California
- County: Riverside County
- Elevation: 1,683 ft (513 m)

Bonnie Bell is an unincorporated community in Riverside County, California, United States. It lies at an elevation of 1683 feet (513 m).

Bonnie Bell is located 3 miles (4.8 km) north of Interstate 10 on Whitewater Canyon Road beside the Whitewater River. The community sits where the most eastern end of the San Gorgonio Pass meets the most northwestern end of the Coachella Valley, 9.5 miles (15.3 km) northwest of Palm Springs.

== Wind turbine controversy ==
The transition point from the San Gorgonio Pass to the Coachella Valley is one of the windiest locations in the United States. This makes the area ideal for wind energy projects. Beginning in the 1980s the San Gorgonio Pass wind farm started being developed. Many wind turbines were proposed and constructed around the community of Bonnie Bell. Though a tiny community, the people of Bonnie Bell strongly resisted any wind development that encroached on the town, or the ridges around the town. In 1992 the residents successfully lobbied the Bureau of Land Management, and Mesa Wind Developers, to move 24 wind turbines from the eastern edge of the company's right-of-way, further back into the San Bernardino Mountains.

In 1999, and again in 2019, new proposals to install wind turbines on the ridges of Whitewater Canyon, above Bonnie Bell, were submitted for consideration. The residents claimed the settlement in 1992 prevented any additional development on the ridge, but the Bureau of Land Management has said future development had not been agreed to in the 1992 settlement.
