= Pinball Hall of Fame (disambiguation) =

The Pinball Hall of Fame is a museum located in Las Vegas, Nevada.

Pinball Hall of Fame may also refer to:

- Pinball Hall of Fame: The Gottlieb Collection, a 2004 pinball video game by FarSight Studios
- Pinball Hall of Fame: The Williams Collection, a 2007 pinball video game by FarSight Studios

== See also ==
- The Pinball Arcade, the Nintendo 3DS version of this pinball video game that only includes tables with non-emulated displays
- Pinball museum
- PHOF
