= Riverside County Parks =

Special district in Riverside County, California, U.S.

The Riverside County Regional Park and Open-Space District ("RivCoParks"; and commonly, Riverside County Parks) is a special district operating in Riverside County, California. The District’s focus encompasses providing high-quality recreational opportunities and preserving important features of the County’s Natural, Cultural and Historical heritage.

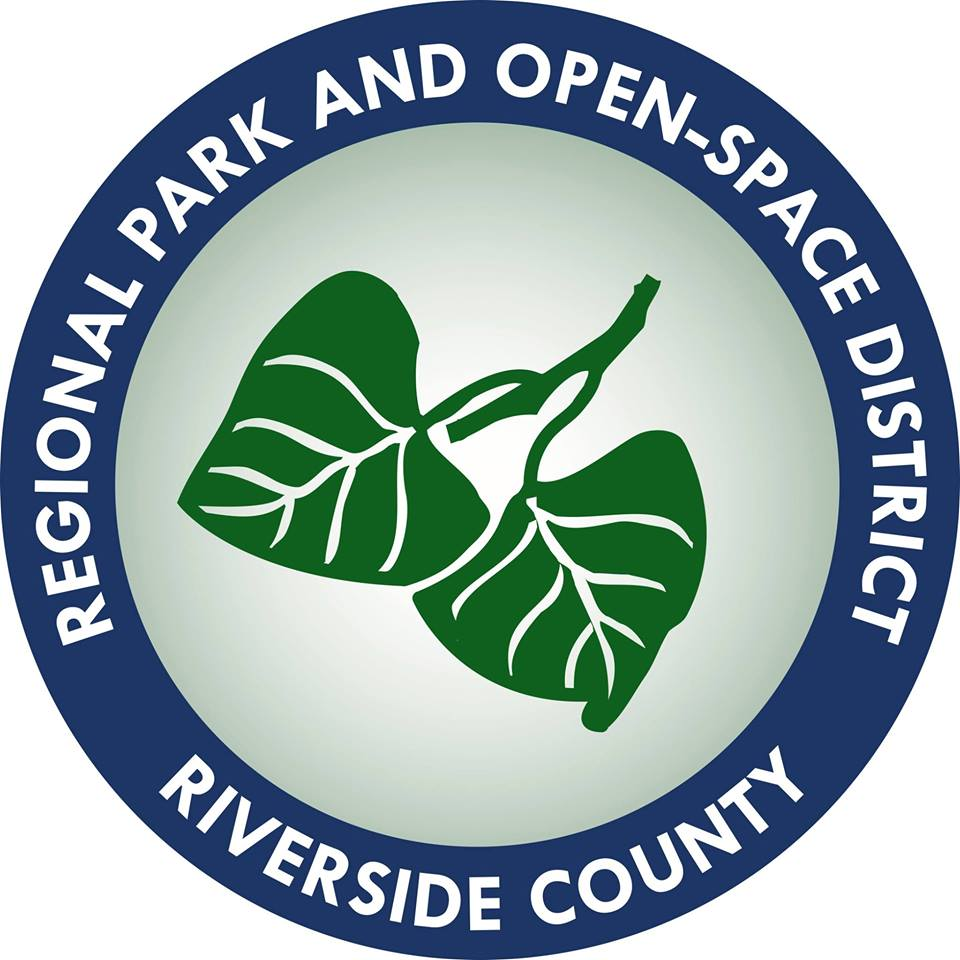
Riverside County Parks Logo

== History ==
RivCoParks was founded in July 1926 when the Riverside County Board of Supervisors created a Board of Forestry to oversee what little open space the County had acquired up to that date. In 1959 the Board of Supervisors created a parks department and appointed a Parks Superintendent. In 1990 the parks department became a district during a general election and formed under the California Public Resources Code 5506.7. (a)..

The parks and facilities administered by RivCoParks vary greatly in size and character. Current inventory includes 71,669 acres of land, 160 miles of regional trail, 11 regional parks, 6 archeological sites, 4 nature centers, 4 historic sites, and 14 wildlife reserves. Some of the parks are wilderness areas, others include a variety of recreation attractions with opportunities for swimming, angling, boating, camping, biking, hiking, and horse riding.

The work of the District is supported by 3 commissions, 1 committee and 6 support groups, which raises funds for the improvement of the parks and programs. The District is a member of the National Association of Regional Parks and Open Space Officers (NACPRO), the California Association of Regional Parks and Open Space Administrators (CARPOSA), the National Recreation and Park Association (NRPA) and the California Parks and Recreation Society (CPRS).

== District Parks and Trails ==
- Bogart Park (transferred to the Beaumont-Cherry Valley Recreation and Park District in 2019)
- Box Springs Mountain Reserve
- Crestmore Manor (event facility and headquarters)
- Gilman Historic Ranch and Wagon Museum
- Goose Flats Wildlife Area
- Harford Springs
- Hidden Valley Wildlife Area
- Hurkey Creek Park
- Idyllwild Park
- Jensen Alvarado Ranch
- Kabian Park
- Lake Cahuilla Recreation Area – a modern reservoir/lake named after the prehistoric Lake Cahuilla
- Lake Skinner Recreation Area
- Lawler Lodge/Cabins
- Louis Robidoux Nature Center
- Mayflower Park
- Maze Stone Park
- McCall Memorial Park
- McIntyre Park
- Miller Park
- Multi-Species Reserve
- Rancho Jurupa Regional Parks
- San Timoteo Canyon Schoolhouse
- Santa Rosa Plateau Ecological Reserve
