= Dutch Pinball Museum =

Museum in Rotterdam, Netherlands

- Established: August 2015
- Coordinates: 51.9082492°N 4.4493252°E
- Public transit access: Delfshaven metro station (Line A, B, C)
- Website: dutchpinballmuseum.com/gb/

The Dutch Pinball Museum is a museum in Rotterdam, the Netherlands. The museum is home to more than 160 different pinball machines ranging from 1930 to today and also includes a rare toupie hollandaise table from the year 1853.

== History ==
The museum originated out of a private collection of founder Gerard van de Sanden. The museum opened on 29 August 2015 but was officially opened by former Dutch Finance Minister Gerrit Zalm on 26 November 2015. The museum opened on the Paul Nijghkade in Katendrecht, but later moved to the Dubbele Palmboom in Delfshaven. In 2023 it had 25,000 visitors.

== Collection ==
The collection consists of 31 electromechanical pinball machines, 43 Solid State pinball machines, and 60 Dot-Matrix pinball machines, as well as an original toupie hollandaise from 1853, which is seen as the predecessor of pinball. All machines made before 1960 are on display. The other machines can be played.

On the ground floor are older pinball machines, such as the first pinball machine with flippers from 1947, Humpty Dumpty and the Toupie Hollandaise from 1853. In addition to a large collection of pinball machines, of which sometimes only one or a few were made, there are many unique items that have to do with the heyday of the pinball machine.

On the upper floors are pinball machines from the 1960s to the present. The operation and technology of a pinball machine is also explained in various ways. This is done, among other things, with a completely transparent pinball machine.

The freely playable pinball machines are set up in various thematically decorated rooms.

For disabled visitors, there are various options available to play the pinball machines.

The Dutch Pinball Museum won the 2024 TWIPY (This Week In Pinball) award for "Best Location Europe".
