= Beaumont–Cherry Valley Recreation and Park District =

District in Riverside County, California

Coordinates: 33.944814°N 116.985585°W

The Beaumont-Cherry Valley Recreation and Park District is a special district in Riverside County, California serving the communities of Beaumont and Cherry Valley. Established in 1972, the District provides parks, park facilities and recreational programs to the local communities.

Management of the Bogart Regional Park was transferred from Riverside County Parks to the District in 2019, and is the largest facility overseen by the District.

== See also ==
- Special Districts in California
