= Tell Them Willie Boy Is Here =

1969 film by Abraham Polonsky

- Theatrical release poster
- Directed by: Abraham Polonsky
- Written by: Abraham Polonsky; Harry Lawton (book)
- Produced by: Jennings Lang; Philip A. Waxman
- Starring: Robert Redford; Katharine Ross; Robert Blake; Susan Clark
- Cinematography: Conrad L. Hall
- Edited by: Melvin Shapiro
- Music by: Dave Grusin
- Color process: Technicolor
- Production companies: Jennings Lang Productions; Philip A. Waxman Productions
- Distributed by: Universal Pictures
- Release date: December 18, 1969 (New York City)
- Running time: 98 minutes
- Country: United States
- Language: English
- Box office: $2,411,583 (US/ Canada rentals)

Tell Them Willie Boy Is Here is a 1969 American Western film based on the true story of a Chemehuevi–Paiute Native American named Willie Boy and his run-in with the law in 1909 in Banning, California, United States. The film is an adaptation of the 1960 book Willie Boy: A Desert Manhunt by Harry Lawton.

The film was written and directed by the once blacklisted Abraham Polonsky, who, due to his blacklisting, had not directed a film since Force of Evil in 1948.

== Plot ==
The film's story revolves around the Paiute Native American outlaw Willie Boy, who escapes with his lover, Lola, after killing her father in self defense. According to tribal custom Willie can then claim Lola as his wife. According to the law, Deputy Sheriff Cooper is required to charge him with murder.

Willie Boy and Lola are hunted for several days by a posse led by Cooper. Cooper is forced to turn back to work security for President Taft. Willie manages to repel the posse's advance when he ambushes them from the top of Ruby Mountain. He only tries to shoot their horses, but ends up accidentally killing a bounty hunter, resulting in another murder charge.

Days later, as the posse closes in, Lola dies by a gunshot wound to the chest. It is left deliberately ambiguous whether Lola shot herself so that she wouldn't slow Willie down or whether Willie killed her to keep her out of the posse's hands. Cooper is inclined to believe the latter and then goes off ahead of the posse to bring in Willie dead or alive. A tense chase through the desert then takes place between the two, as the horse-mounted Cooper closes in on the elusive Indian renegade, who is forced to continue his exhausting flight on foot. As soon as Cooper catches up, he comes under fire from an unseen Willie who is positioned atop Ruby Mountain. Cooper narrowly avoids being shot on several occasions.

In the film's climax, Cooper maneuvers behind Willie, who has donned a ghost shirt, and tells him he can turn around if he wants to, which he does. The two pause before Willie raises his rifle at Cooper, who beats him to the draw and shoots him. Fatally wounded in the chest, Willie tumbles down the hillside. Cooper picks up Willie's gun and finds that it wasn't loaded, making it seem that Willie deliberately chose death over capture. Abashed, Cooper carries the slain outlaw the rest of the way down Ruby Mountain and delivers him to other Paiutes, who carry the corpse away and burn the remains.

When confronted by the county sheriff, Cooper is told that the burning of Willie's body will ruin the people's chance to see Willie in the (now-dead) flesh, denying them the ability "to see something". Cooper retorts: "Tell them we're all out of souvenirs".

== Cast ==
- Robert Redford as Cooper
- Katharine Ross as Lola
- Robert Blake as Willie
- Susan Clark as Liz
- Barry Sullivan as Calvert
- John Vernon as Hacker
- Charles Aidman as Benby
- Charles McGraw as Wilson
- Shelly Novack as Finney
- Robert Lipton as Newcombe
- Lloyd Gough as Dexter
- Ned Romero as Tom
- John Wheeler as Newman
- Eric Holland as Digger
- Garry Walberg as Dr. Mills
- Jerry Velasco as Chino
- George Tyne as Le Marie
- Lee De Broux as Meathead
- Wayne Sutherlin as Harry
- Jerome Raphel as Salesman
- Lou Frizzell as Station Agent

== History ==
As depicted in the movie, Willie Boy and Lola (her actual name was Carlota, though she was also called Isoleta and Lolita in various accounts) did run through the Morongo Valley. Carlota was found shot in the back in an area known as The Pipes in northwest Yucca Valley. Willie Boy was blamed for her death, but a 1994 book detailing Carlota's autopsy proved that the bullet had been shot from a long distance away, implicating the posse. Willie Boy did ambush the posse at Ruby Mountain, killing several horses and accidentally wounding a posse member. Members of the white posse claimed that Willie Boy ended his 'last stand' by suicide on the flanks of Ruby Mountain west of the current site of Landers, California, a fable that has been widely accepted by the white population. However, it is generally understood and accepted among Native Americans that Willie Boy escaped to Las Vegas, where he later died of tuberculosis. The posse had claimed that it would have been too difficult to bring the body back, as was the custom of the day, so instead they burned it, making identification problematic, to say the very least.

Willie Boy's grave monument can be found at 34°17′30″N 116°32′15″W. The monument itself bears the inscription “The West’s Last Famous Manhunt”, alluding to the notion that this was the last effort of its type before the use of a posse was generally replaced by modern, 'fully' staffed and empowered law enforcement agencies.

== Reception ==
On the review aggregator website Rotten Tomatoes, 69% of 16 critics' reviews are positive.

== Awards ==
Year	Award	Category	Recipient/Nominee	Result	Ref
1971	British Academy Film Awards	Best Actor in a Leading Role	Robert Redford	Won	
1971	British Academy Film Awards	Best Actress in a Leading Role	Katharine Ross	Won	

== See also ==
- List of American films of 1969
- Gilman Ranch
