= Cabazon, California =

Cabazon
- Unincorporated community Census-designated place
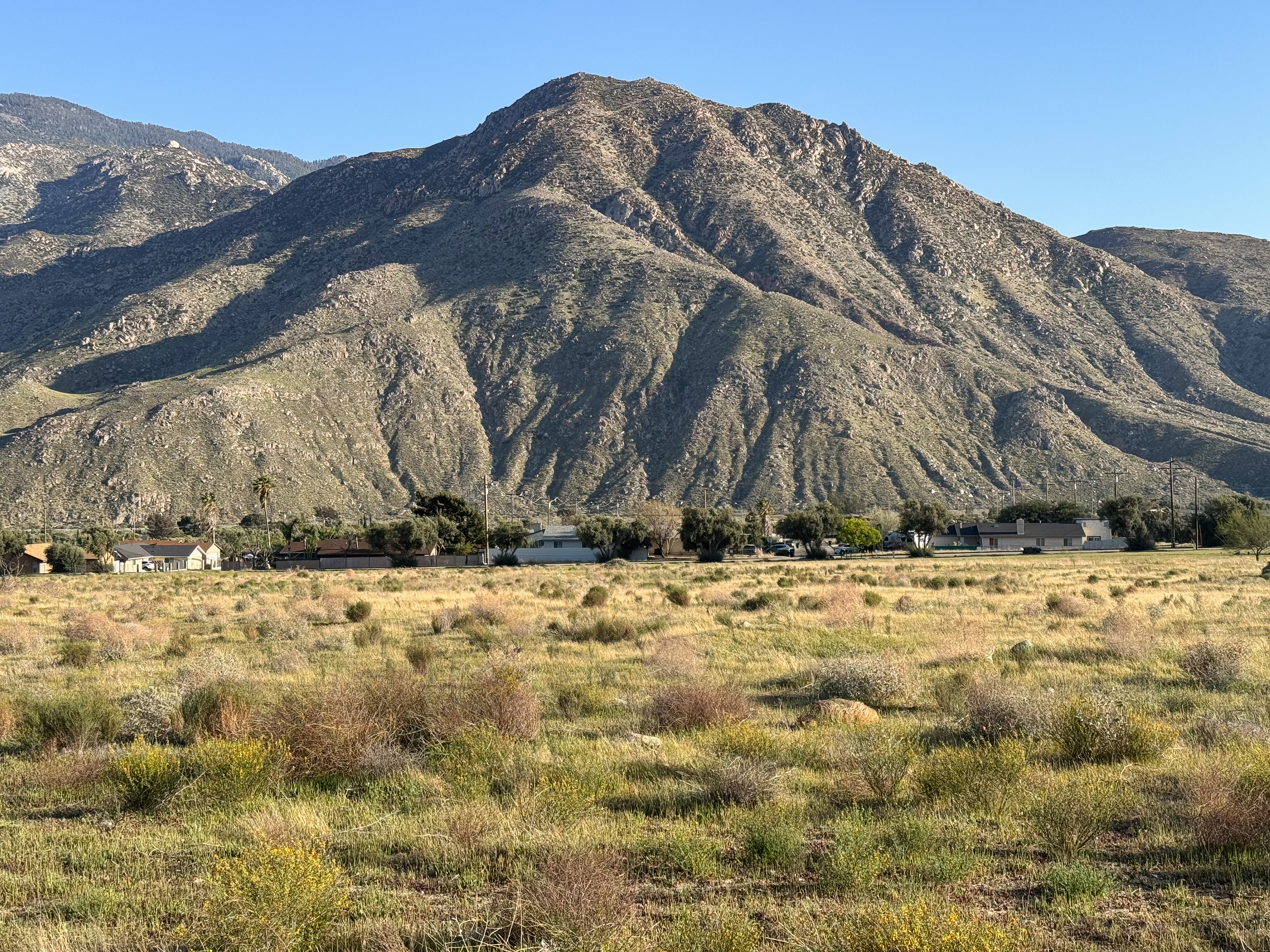
- Cabazon and San Jacinto Mountains

- Location in Riverside County and the state of California

- Location in California Location in the United States
- Coordinates: 33°54′33″N 116°45′59″W
- Country: United States
- State: California
- County: Riverside

Area
  - Total: 4.89 sq mi (12.67 km^{2})
  - Land: 4.89 sq mi (12.67 km^{2})
  - Water: 0 sq mi (0.00 km^{2}) 0%
- Elevation: 1,834 ft (559 m)

Population (2020)
  - Total: 2,629
  - Density: 537.3/sq mi (207.45/km^{2})
- Time zone: UTC-8 (PST)
  - Summer (DST): UTC-7 (PDT)
- ZIP codes: 92230, 92282
- Area code: 951
- FIPS code: 06-09360
- GNIS feature IDs: 1652679, 2407936

Cabazon (Spanish: Cabazón) is an unincorporated community in the Inland Empire region of Riverside County, California, United States. Cabazon is on the Pacific Crest Trail. In the 21st century, the area has become a tourist stop, due to the Morongo Casino, Resort & Spa, Desert Hills Premium Outlets, and Cabazon Dinosaurs. The population was 2,629 during the 2020 census. For statistical purposes, the United States Census Bureau has defined Cabazon as a census-designated place (CDP).

== History ==
Cabazon was initially established as a settlement in the 1870s after the Southern Pacific Railroad built a railroad station there. The station was originally named Jacinto, but was renamed Cabezone after the Spanish name of a nearby Indian rancheria. The Spanish had named the latter after a chief of the Cahuilla Indians during the colonial period. He was named for his large head.

In the late 19th century, a workers' camp known as Hall's Siding, which included a hotel and dance hall, developed. It was abandoned after the railroad relocated its facilities. In 1884 a new town was laid out by the Scottish-owned Cabazon Land and Water Company, which established a fruit farm. Some lots were sold, but were later repurchased.

The large plot of land stayed intact until it was bought by a developer in 1910. The developer established a school and a post office, but was unable to attract many residents.

Cabazon was incorporated as a city on November 1, 1955. Under California law, incorporated cities could host cardrooms, while unincorporated areas could not. Some businessmen hoped that cardrooms would attract new residents and businesses. During the next 16 years, the city struggled with scandal, political instability, and stalled growth, as cardroom operators vied with other landowners and residents for control of the city government.

In its first seven years, a succession of 18 police chiefs and 21 City Council members served for short terms in the city. One key dispute was between residents who hoped that Cabazon could be developed as a resort city like Palm Springs to the east, versus cardroom owners who wanted to keep Cabazon's population low so that the city government's operating expenses (and their taxes) would remain low and not impinge on their profits.

In a popular tactic of small jurisdictions, the city turned then-U.S. Route 60 down Main Street into a speed trap; it raised as much as $19,000 per year by fines from speeding tickets. That revenue stream vanished when Interstate 10 was completed in California circa 1964, and US Route 60 was decommissioned. A cardroom operator sued the City Council over its attempt to raise the license fee for cardrooms. This infuriated those landowners and residents who did not profit from the city's cardrooms. They sought to shut down the city so that the cardrooms would also be forced to shut down.

On September 14, 1971, the city's electorate voted in a special election, 192 to 131 in favor of disincorporation. The election results were upheld by the state courts, and the city government disincorporated in 1972.

With changing demographics and regional economy, locals in the early 21st century have intermittently discussed reincorporating the area.

=== Esperanza Fire ===
In late October 2006, a major arson fire started near Cabazon. During the course of five days, the Esperanza Fire burned over 40,000 acres (160 km^{2}) and resulted in the deaths of five firefighters. California State Route 243 was renamed as the "Esperanza Firefighters Memorial Highway" to honor them.

== Geography ==
According to the United States Census Bureau, the CDP has a total area of 4.9 square miles (13 km^{2}), all of which is land. The Census Bureau definition of the area may not precisely correspond to the local understanding of the community.

=== Climate ===
According to the Köppen Climate Classification system, Cabazon has a hot desert climate, abbreviated "BWh" on climate maps.

Climate data for Cabazon, California
Month	Jan	Feb	Mar	Apr	May	Jun	Jul	Aug	Sep	Oct	Nov	Dec	Year
Record high °F (°C)	79.2 (26.2)	88.4 (31.3)	93.2 (34.0)	98.1 (36.7)	105.3 (40.7)	109.2 (42.9)	115.4 (46.3)	110.3 (43.5)	115.2 (46.2)	112.3 (44.6)	96.3 (35.7)	79.3 (26.3)	115.4 (46.3)
Mean daily maximum °F (°C)	54.7 (12.6)	62.4 (16.9)	67.9 (19.9)	75.4 (24.1)	83.8 (28.8)	91.2 (32.9)	95.8 (35.4)	94.5 (34.7)	89.4 (31.9)	80.4 (26.9)	65.7 (18.7)	55.2 (12.9)	76.5 (24.7)
Daily mean °F (°C)	45.3 (7.4)	51.2 (10.7)	56.0 (13.3)	61.3 (16.3)	68.9 (20.5)	75.7 (24.3)	80.4 (26.9)	79.0 (26.1)	73.9 (23.3)	64.6 (18.1)	52.4 (11.3)	44.3 (6.8)	62.8 (17.1)
Mean daily minimum °F (°C)	35.8 (2.1)	40.0 (4.4)	44.0 (6.7)	47.1 (8.4)	53.9 (12.2)	60.2 (15.7)	65.0 (18.3)	63.4 (17.4)	58.3 (14.6)	48.8 (9.3)	39.1 (3.9)	33.4 (0.8)	49.1 (9.5)
Record low °F (°C)	28.9 (−1.7)	33.1 (0.6)	36.6 (2.6)	41.7 (5.4)	49.2 (9.6)	56.0 (13.3)	60.2 (15.7)	59.8 (15.4)	53.6 (12.0)	42.9 (6.1)	34.3 (1.3)	25.5 (−3.6)	25.5 (−3.6)
Average precipitation inches (mm)	1.3 (33)	1.2 (30)	1.4 (36)	0.5 (13)	0.2 (5.1)	0.1 (2.5)	0 (0)	0 (0)	0.2 (5.1)	0.3 (7.6)	0.6 (15)	0.7 (18)	6.4 (160)
Average snowfall inches (cm)	1.1 (2.8)	0 (0)	0 (0)	0 (0)	0 (0)	0 (0)	0 (0)	0 (0)	0 (0)	0 (0)	0 (0)	0.6 (1.5)	1.7 (4.3)
Average rainy days	5	5	5	3	1	0	1	1	1	2	3	5	32
Source: Weatherbase

== Demographics ==
Historical population
Census	Pop.	Note	%±
1990	1,588		—
2000	2,229		40.4%
2010	2,535		13.7%
2020	2,629		3.7%
U.S. Decennial Census; 1860–1870 1880-1890; 1900 1910 1920; 1930 1940 1950; 1960 1970 1980; 1990 2000 2010

Cabazon first appeared as a census designated place in the 1990 U.S. census.

=== Racial and ethnic composition ===
Cabazon CDP, California – Racial and ethnic composition Note: the US Census treats Hispanic/Latino as an ethnic category. This table excludes Latinos from the racial categories and assigns them to a separate category. Hispanics/Latinos may be of any race.
Race / Ethnicity (NH = Non-Hispanic)	Pop 2000	Pop 2010	Pop 2020	% 2000	% 2010	% 2020
White alone (NH)	1,271	1,072	807	57.02%	42.29%	30.70%
Black or African American alone (NH)	91	130	139	4.08%	5.13%	5.29%
Native American or Alaska Native alone (NH)	77	59	52	3.45%	2.33%	1.98%
Asian alone (NH)	22	38	71	0.99%	1.50%	2.70%
Native Hawaiian or Pacific Islander alone (NH)	3	14	3	0.13%	0.55%	0.11%
Other race alone (NH)	0	0	20	0.00%	0.00%	0.76%
Mixed race or Multiracial (NH)	90	87	137	4.04%	3.43%	5.21%
Hispanic or Latino (any race)	675	1,135	1,400	30.28%	44.77%	53.25%
Total	2,229	2,535	2,629	100.00%	100.00%	100.00%

=== 2020 census ===
As of the 2020 census, Cabazon had a population of 2,629 and a population density of 537.3 inhabitants per square mile (207.5/km^{2}). The median age was 34.8 years. The age distribution was 27.0% under the age of 18, 7.2% aged 18 to 24, 29.5% aged 25 to 44, 24.6% aged 45 to 64, and 11.8% who were 65 years of age or older. For every 100 females, there were 98.7 males, and for every 100 females age 18 and over, there were 96.3 males age 18 and over.

The census reported that 98.6% of the population lived in households, 1.4% lived in non-institutionalized group quarters, and no one was institutionalized. 0.0% of residents lived in urban areas, while 100.0% lived in rural areas.

There were 834 households, of which 38.4% included children under the age of 18. Of all households, 36.9% were married-couple households, 9.0% were cohabiting couple households, 22.9% had a male householder with no spouse or partner present, and 31.2% had a female householder with no spouse or partner present. About 24.6% of all households were made up of individuals, and 12.2% had someone living alone who was 65 years of age or older. The average household size was 3.11. There were 568 families (68.1% of all households).

There were 917 housing units at an average density of 187.4 units per square mile (72.4 units/km^{2}), of which 834 (90.9%) were occupied. Of all housing units, 9.1% were vacant, 56.8% of occupied units were owner-occupied, and 43.2% were occupied by renters. The homeowner vacancy rate was 2.3% and the rental vacancy rate was 3.5%.

Racial composition as of the 2020 census
Race	Number	Percent
White	973	37.0%
Black or African American	152	5.8%
American Indian and Alaska Native	85	3.2%
Asian	73	2.8%
Native Hawaiian and Other Pacific Islander	4	0.2%
Some other race	797	30.3%
Two or more races	545	20.7%

=== Income and poverty ===
In 2023, the US Census Bureau estimated that the median household income was $69,704, and the per capita income was $31,305. About 16.3% of families and 15.6% of the population were below the poverty line.

=== 2010 census ===
At the 2010 United States census Cabazon had a population of 2,535. The population density was 518.0 inhabitants per square mile (200.0/km^{2}). The racial makeup of Cabazon was 1,751 (69.1%) Caucasian (42.3% Non-Hispanic Caucasian), 135 (5.3%) African American, 90 (3.6%) Native American, 38 (1.5%) Asian, 14 (0.6%) Pacific Islander, 358 (14.1%) from other races, and 149 (5.9%) from two or more races. Hispanic or Latino of any race were 1,135 persons (44.8%).

The census reported that 2,526 people (99.6% of the population) lived in households, 9 (0.4%) lived in non-institutionalized group quarters, and no one was institutionalized.

There were 792 households, 350 (44.2%) had children under the age of 18 living in them, 317 (40.0%) were opposite-sex married couples living together, 181 (22.9%) had a female householder with no husband present, 81 (10.2%) had a male householder with no wife present. There were 81 (10.2%) unmarried opposite-sex partnerships, and 8 (1.0%) same-sex married couples or partnerships. 157 households (19.8%) were one person and 54 (6.8%) had someone living alone who was 65 or older. The average household size was 3.19. There were 579 families (73.1% of households); the average family size was 3.68.

The age distribution was 798 people (31.5%) under the age of 18, 275 people (10.8%) aged 18 to 24, 577 people (22.8%) aged 25 to 44, 674 people (26.6%) aged 45 to 64, and 211 people (8.3%) who were 65 or older. The median age was 31.4 years. For every 100 females, there were 101.0 males. For every 100 females age 18 and over, there were 94.5 males.

There were 932 housing units at an average density of 190.5 per square mile, of the occupied units 459 (58.0%) were owner-occupied and 333 (42.0%) were rented. The homeowner vacancy rate was 2.5%; the rental vacancy rate was 5.6%. 1,382 people (54.5% of the population) lived in owner-occupied housing units and 1,144 people (45.1%) lived in rental housing units.

According to the 2010 United States Census, Cabazon had a median household income of $33,333, with 22.1% of the population living below the federal poverty line.

== Major landmarks ==
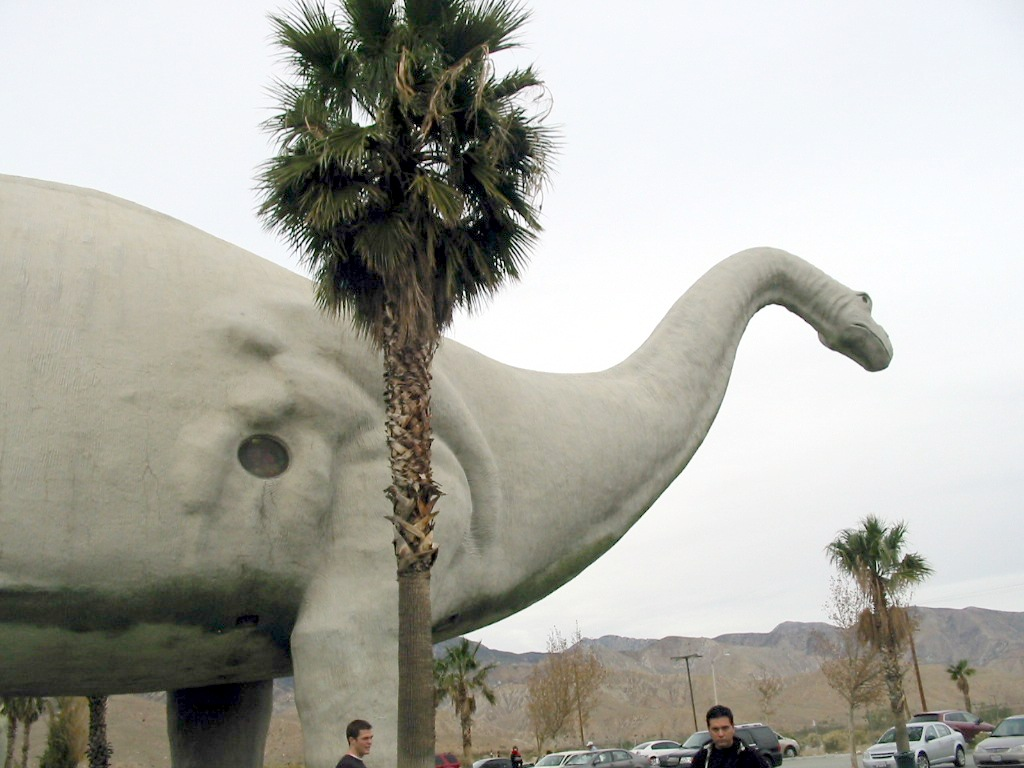
Dinny the Dinosaur

=== Roadside attraction ===
Claude Bell's giant dinosaur sculptures are icons of roadside America. The site features two sculptures: a 150-ton building in the shape of a larger-than-life-sized Brontosaurus (begun in 1964, completed in 1975), and a 100-ton Tyrannosaurus rex structure (built in 1981). The dinosaurs, nicknamed "Dinny" and "Mr. Rex," respectively, were installed to attract customers to Claude Bell's Wheel Inn Cafe.

Some residents grew up with them along the highway in southern California; others may remember them from various films and videos, notably in Pee-wee's Big Adventure. Developers purchased the dinosaurs in 2005 from the Bell family for $1.2 million.

=== Outlet shopping center ===
Cabazon is a stop for outlet shopping; Desert Hills Premium Outlets and Cabazon Outlets each operate outlet malls.

=== Morongo Casino, Resort & Spa ===
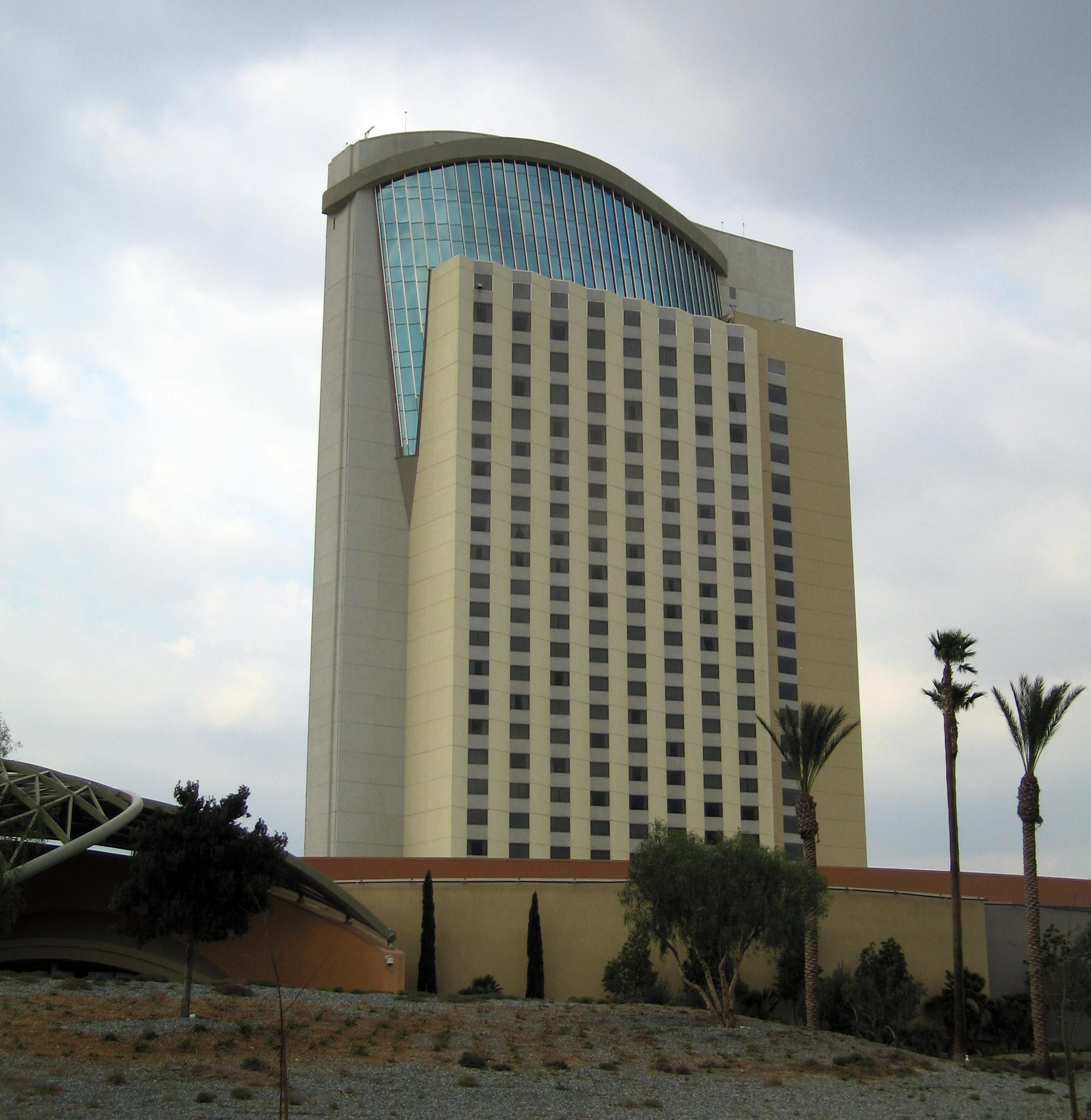
The Morongo Casino, Resort & Spa

Cabazon is the territory of the federally recognized Morongo Band of Mission Indians, which have developed the Morongo Casino, Resort & Spa. Its 27-story hotel tower dominates the San Gorgonio Pass. This is one of the largest Native American casinos in the United States.

In addition, they partnered for tribal business with Arrowhead Mountain Springwater to develop a huge water-bottling facility on the eastern edge of Cabazon in 2003. Its construction earned a LEED Silver rating.

== Library ==
The Cabazon Library, opened in 2013, is part of the Riverside County Library System, operated under contract by Library Systems and Services, LLC.

== Government ==
In the Riverside County Board of Supervisors, Cabazon is in 5th district, represented by Democrat Yxstian Gutierrez.

In the California State Legislature, Cabazon is in the 19th senatorial district, represented by Republican Rosilicie Ochoa Bogh, and in the 47th Assembly district, represented by Republican Greg Wallis.

In the United States House of Representatives, Cabazon is in California's 25th congressional district, represented by Democrat Raul Ruiz.

== Transportation ==
The Amtrak Thruway 39 provides daily connections to Fullerton station, Palm Springs, and Indio.

== Education ==
It is in the Banning Unified School District.

== Popular culture ==
This part of the freeway Interstate 10 appears in the musical video of the British band Tears for Fears, "Everybody Wants to Rule the World", published in 1985.

Douglas Coupland mentions "the cement dinosaurs up at the Cabazon truck stop" in his 1991 novel Generation X: Tales for an Accelerated Culture.
