= Harry Lawton =

American journalist (1927–2005)

- Born: Harry Wilson Lawton; December 11, 1927; Long Beach, California, US
- Died: November 20, 2005 (aged 77); Dana Point, California, US
- Occupations: Author, novelist, journalist, editor

Harry Wilson Lawton (December 11, 1927 – November 20, 2005) was an American writer, journalist, editor and historian who wrote several books about Native Americans in California. One of them, Willie Boy: a Desert Manhunt, was made into a movie in 1969, by the title Tell Them Willie Boy Is Here, starring Robert Redford.

== Early life ==
Lawton was born on December 11, 1927, in Long Beach, California. He enrolled at University of California, Berkeley after high school. There he wrote for the college newspapers and magazines. Lawton opened the Haunted Bookstore in Berkeley, which specialized in rare Western Americana.

He was also a reporter, and while working at The Press-Enterprise, he heard about the Last Great Manhunt of the Old West.

== Willie Boy ==
The Last Great Manhunt was a 1909 story about Willie Boy, a Paiute-Chemehuevi Indian who falls in love with his distant cousin, Carlota Boniface. Although the couple was madly in love, the marriage is forbidden by Carlota's father, Old Mike, the tribe's shaman. Desperate, Willie Boy kills Old Mike and runs away with Carlota into the California Desert. In the end, Carlota is shot to death and Willie Boy commits suicide.

Lawton's Willie Boy: a Desert Manhunt won several awards for best non-fiction novel, and was later made into a movie, Tell Them Willie Boy Is Here in 1969. It was precisely based on interviews and research the author did on the Morongo Indian Reservation during three years before the publishing of the book.

== Work ==
Respected by his fellow writers, Lawton always believed in the preservation of the American Indian community. He helped found the California Museum of Photography; the Malki Museum, which was the first American Indian Museum established at a California reservation; and the Malki Press, a non-profit organization responsible for publishing books about the Native Americans in California.

At University of California he created the Creative Writing Program, and the Journal of California and Great Basin Anthropology.

He was also an advocate for the preservation and archeological exploration of Riverside's Chinatown. and served as the historian on the Great Basin Foundation's archaeological dig at the former Chinatown site in Riverside, California. Through this involvement on the project, Lawton compiled an extensive collection of research material pertaining to the early Chinese immigrants that settled in the Inland Empire region of Southern California. That research collection was donated to the University of California, Riverside.

Lawton died on November 20, 2005, in Dana Point, California.

== Personal life ==
Behind the scenes, Lawton was also a philanthropist. Besides contributing to the preservation of California history, he was passionate about issues related to dyslexia and ADHD. Lawton was a supporter of the Democratic Party and human rights, and he was opposed to war, prejudice, and intolerance. He was a contributor to the American Cancer Society, AMFAR, Entertainment Industry Foundation, Greenpeace, and the ASPCA, although he always preferred anonymity.

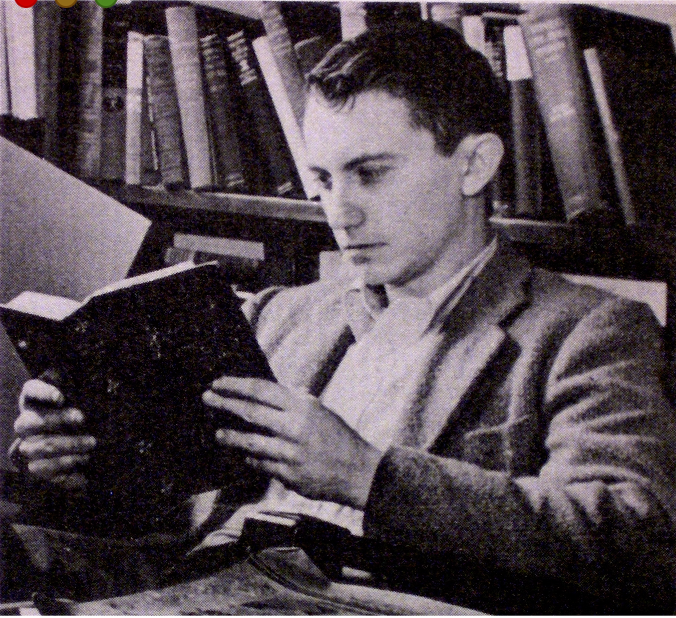
Harry Lawton, 1951, in the Haunted Bookshop, Berkeley, CA

Lawton is the father of Hollywood film director, writer and producer J. F. Lawton and father-in-law of journalist, writer and LGBT activist Paola Lawton.

== See also ==
- Lists of writers
