= CALFED Bay-Delta Program =

California state government department

- Official logo

Agency overview
- Formed: 1994
- Headquarters: 650 Capitol Mall, Sacramento, California
- Agency executives: Joe Grindstaff, Director; Wendy Halverson Martin, Chief Deputy Director
- Parent agency: California Resources Agency
- Website: http://www.calwater.ca.gov

The CALFED Bay-Delta Program, also known as CALFED, is a department within the government of California, administered under the California Resources Agency. The department acts as consortium, coordinating the activities and interests of the state government of California and the U.S. federal government to focus on interrelated water problems in the state’s Sacramento–San Joaquin River Delta. The coordination program was created in 1994 by Governor Pete Wilson and federal Interior Secretary Bruce Babbitt following a decade of chaotic disputes between the state of California, the federal government, environmental groups, agricultural interests, and municipal water services.

The current Director of CALFED is Joe Grindstaff. The department is located along Capitol Mall in Sacramento.

== Responsibilities ==
CALFED's responsibilities for the Sacramento-San Joaquin River Delta include:

- To ensure the reliability of water supplies within the Delta.
- To improve and safeguard the Delta's water quality. The Delta currently serves as the tap to 25 million Californians who receive at least some of their drinking water.
- To restore the Delta's ecosystem by protecting native species and eradicating invasive species.
- To improve levee protection along the Delta's rivers.

== Coordinating agencies ==
Various federal and state agencies fall into CALFED's coordination authority. These agencies include:

=== State ===
- California Resources Agency
  - California Bay-Delta Authority
  - California Department of Conservation
  - California Department of Fish and Game
  - California Department of Water Resources
  - California State Parks
  - Reclamation Board
  - Delta Protection Commission
  - San Francisco Bay Conservation and Development Commission
- California Environmental Protection Agency
  - State Water Resources Control Board
- California Department of Food and Agriculture
- California Department of Health and Human Services
  - California Department of Public Health

=== Federal ===
- U.S. Department of the Interior
  - U.S. Bureau of Reclamation
  - U.S. Fish and Wildlife Service
  - U.S. Geological Survey
  - U.S. Bureau of Land Management
- U.S. Environmental Protection Agency
- U.S. Department of Defense
  - U.S. Army Corps of Engineers
- U.S. Department of Agriculture
  - Natural Resources Conservation Service
  - U.S. Forest Service
  - National Marine Fisheries Service
- U.S. Department of Energy
  - Western Area Power Administration

In addition to the state and federal agencies, nearly 60 Native American tribes also participate in the program's activity coordination.

== Criticisms ==
In February 2006, the California Legislative Analyst's Office, or LAO, published criticisms of the CALFED Program during its annual budget review, citing sources from the California State Legislature and various independent review panels. The LAO report indicated that CALFED had "[failed] to develop a viable long-term finance plan (as directed by the Legislature)," as well as its "lack of focus and priorities," and "lack of a performance orientation." Due to its various coordination agencies and priorities, the LAO declared that "the program had strayed from its original focus of resolving conflicts among water-related interests in the Delta, by expanding into what looked like a statewide water management program, resulting in substantial overlap with the mission and responsibilities of [the] California Department of Water Resources."

The LAO recommended to the Legislature and for Governor Arnold Schwarzenegger to reform CALFED by establishing realistic budget reviews and create more confined responsibilities that would not overlap into other departments.

== See also ==
- Sacramento River
- San Joaquin River
- Central Valley Project
- California Water Fix and Eco Restore, formerly known as the Bay Delta Conservation Plan
- California Water Wars
