= People for the American Way =

American progressive advocacy group

People For the American Way
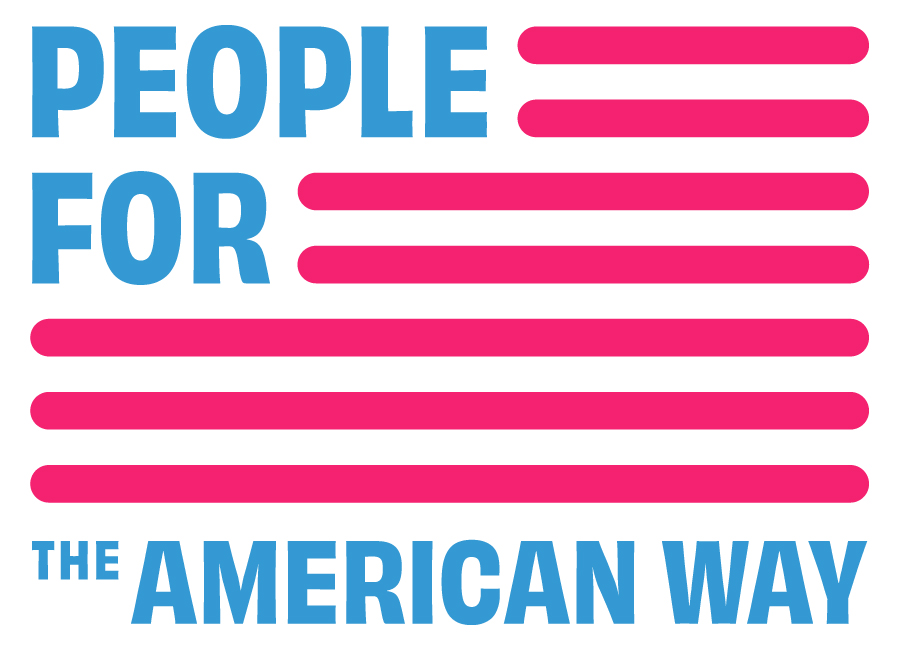
- Founded: September 4, 1980; 46 years ago
- Founder: Norman Lear
- Type: Advocacy group
- Tax ID no.: 52-1366721
- Legal status: 501(c)(4) social welfare organization
- Purpose: Progressive/liberal advocacy
- Location: Washington, D.C.
- Region served: United States
- Method: Media attention, direct-appeal campaigns
- Chair: Lara Bergthold
- President: Svante Myrick
- Affiliations: People for the American Way Foundation; People for the American Way Voters Alliance; People for the American Way Action Fund
- Revenue: $6.5 million (2023)
- Expenses: $9.05 million (2023)
- Website: peoplefor.org

People for the American Way (PFAW /ˈpfɔː/) is a progressive advocacy group in the United States. Organized as a 501(c)(4) non-profit organization, PFAW was registered in 1981 by the television producer Norman Lear, a self-described liberal who founded the organization in 1980 to challenge the Christian right agenda of the Moral Majority.

While publicly known as People for the American Way since its inception, the group only legally held this name from 1985 to 1998. From 1981 to 1985, the group's official name was Citizen for Constitutional Concerns Inc. The group was officially renamed "People for the American Way Foundation" in 1998.

== History ==
PFAW was founded by the television producer Norman Lear in opposition to the publicized agenda of the Moral Majority, a prominent and influential American political organization associated with the Christian right. Officially incorporated on September 4, 1980, its co-founders included Democratic congresswoman Barbara Jordan, University of Notre Dame president Theodore Hesburgh and Time Inc. chairman and CEO Andrew Heiskell. PFAW began as a project of the Tides Foundation, a donor-advised fund that directs money to politically liberal causes.

Among the group's most frequent targets were Jerry Falwell, Jimmy Swaggart and Pat Robertson.

Though always publicly known as People for the American Way, the group was originally trademarked as "Citizens for Constitutional Concerns Inc." prior to officially taking the "People for the American Way" name in 1985.

Former presidents of PFAW include Arthur Kropp, Tony Podesta, and Ralph Neas.

Soon after its founding, PFAW launched an affiliated 501(c)(3) organization, People for the American Way Foundation, for the purpose of conducting more extensive educational and research activities for liberal causes. "People for the American Way Foundation" would also become the group's legal name in 1998. From 2004 to 2008, major donors to PFAW's foundation included George Soros' Open Society Institute, the Miriam G. and Ira D. Wallach Foundation, the Bauman Family Foundation, and the Evelyn and Walter Haas Jr. Fund.

In 1998, the People for the American Way Voters Alliance was launched as a political action committee.

== Activities ==
PFAW was responsible for the 1982 television special I Love Liberty, which was described by the Washington Post as "America's first left-wing patriotic rally." PFAW has also been active in battles over judicial nominations, opposing U.S. Supreme Court nominees Robert Bork and Brett Kavanaugh and supporting the nomination of Sonia Sotomayor. PFAW is also active in federal elections, donating $339,874 to oppose Republican candidates in the 2014 election cycle and $351,075 to oppose Republican candidates in the 2016 election cycle.

=== Right Wing Watch ===
PFAW's Right Wing Watch project is a website that catalogs statements of public figures whom they label as right-wing, including politicians, preachers, and others, with a focus on hate speech and right-wing conspiracy theories. The web site was founded in 2007, expanding on PFAW's earlier practice of VHS recording clips from television programs such as Pat Robertson's The 700 Club, for distribution to news media. In 2013, evangelist and politician Gordon Klingenschmitt sent DMCA takedown notices to YouTube against Right Wing Watch's channel based on copyright claims. The Electronic Frontier Foundation provided legal counsel to Right Wing Watch to defend their channel and posts against YouTube's actions.

In 2014, HGTV withdrew from plans to produce a television series with Jason and David Benham after Right Wing Watch made an issue of their statements about homosexuality.

In 2018, Salon.com and The Daily Telegraph credited Jared Holt, a Right Wing Watch researcher, for causing the removal of Alex Jones's InfoWars program from multiple content distribution sites, including Apple, Inc, YouTube, Facebook, and Spotify. Afterwards, Holt said he received death threats.

In June 2021, Right Wing Watch's YouTube channel, which had been operating for about 10 years, was temporarily suspended by YouTube, who stated that the suspension had been an accident. At the time, the channel had about 47,000 subscribers.

== Leadership ==
Michael Keegan served as the organization's president for 11 years through June 2020. On June 15, 2020, Ben Jealous succeeded Keegan as president, and Svante Myrick succeeded Jealous as president on November 14, 2022. Myrick abruptly resigned as mayor of Ithaca, New York, to take that position. Members of the group's board of directors include Cristela Alonzo, Alec Baldwin, Seth MacFarlane, Joel Madden, Bertis Downs IV, Dolores Huerta, Josh Sapan, Howie Klein, Alyssa Milano, David Saperstein, Margery Tabankin, Reg Weaver, and Carrie Mae Weems.

== See also ==
- Mi Familia Vota
