= Transformative Climate Communities Program =

Climate grant program in California

The Transformative Climate Communities Program (TCC) is a California grant program that funds community-led climate and economic development projects in disadvantaged communities. The program is administered by the California Strategic Growth Council and the California Department of Conservation administers the program on the council's behalf.

The program was created by the California Legislature in 2016 with Assembly Bill 2722, which directs the council to award competitive grants for neighborhood plans containing multiple coordinated greenhouse gas reduction projects that also provide local economics, environmental, and health benefits.

TCC finances groups of coordinated projects within a defined neighborhood including affordable housing, transit access, solar energy, green infrastructure, workforce training, and anti-displacement programs.

The first implementation grants were announced in January 2019 and went to neighborhoods in Los Angeles where they received $133 million. As of December 2023, the council reported awarding more than $424 million across 37 neighborhoods.
