= Liane Randolph =

Chair of the California Air Resources Board
- In office 2020–2025
- Governor: Gavin Newsom
- Preceded by: Mary D. Nichols

Personal details
- Education: UCLA School of Law (JD)

Liane Randolph is the chair of the California Air Resources Board. She was appointed to that position in December 2020 by California Governor Gavin Newsom, succeeding Mary Nichols. Newsom made the appointment shortly after issuing an executive order tasking the agency with developing regulations to phase out the sales of new internal combustion passenger vehicles by 2035. Her term as CARB chair lasts until December 31, 2026.

Before joining CARB, Randolph served as a commissioner of the California Public Utilities Commission from 2015 to 2021, where she worked on energy efficiency, integrated resource planning, and regulation of transportation network companies. She was appointed to the CPUC on December 23, 2014, by Governor Jerry Brown. Prior to the CPUC, she worked as the deputy secretary and general counsel of the California Natural Resources Agency. In that capacity she worked on the agreement to remove dams on the Klamath River.

She also served as the chair of the California Fair Political Practices Commission for four years, having been appointed to that role by then-governor Gray Davis in 2003. After that term, she worked for the law firm Pillsbury Winthrop Shaw Pittman.

She completed her Juris Doctor at the UCLA School of Law, and also did her B.A. in history at UCLA. She lives in Oakland, California with her husband and family.

In March 2024, Randolph led a delegation of California officials to India, to learn about the success that Indian Railways has had in electrifying their network.

On September 30, 2025, Randolph is retiring from public service. She will be succeeded as CARB chair by Lauren Sanchez, the Senior Advisor to the Governor for Climate.
