= Redbud Woods controversy =

2005 deforestation dispute

The Redbud Woods controversy was a dispute between protesters and the administration of Cornell University in Ithaca, New York over the demolition of a patch of woodlands known as the "Redbud Woods." The area received this name because of the many Redbud trees that grew there and whose blossoms gave the woods a pink tint in the springtime. The website of Cornell University Plantations contained, on September 3, 2005, a description of the woods, and used the name Redbud Woods, so it had some official status at Cornell under this name.

== History ==
Early in Cornell's history, at the turn of the 20th century, banker and hardware magnate Robert H. Treman, Class of 1878, built his family estate on University Hill, just west of today's West Campus. Treman hired his friend Warren Manning, a pioneer of American landscape architecture, to design the site.

On November 2, 1901, The Ithaca Daily News reported that the west lawn would be "left to nature as the best gardener." Upon his death in 1937, Treman, who preserved all of the Ithaca area's gorges, donated $5000 to the University specifically for the beautification of the campus. Much of his west lawn grew into the Redbud Woods, which retains many original Manning design elements and boasts locally rare yellow oak and hackberry trees as well as an unusually dense stand of redbuds.

Redbud Woods was part of the landscaping of Robert H. Treman's historic estate. In the late 19th century, Warren Manning designed the landscape of the Treman family estate (now Von Cramm Hall, 660, and the Kahin Center) so that it would grow into natural woodlands and beautify the campus. The woods, if left to grow untouched, might eventually reach the stage of a climax forest. Over time, Redbud Woods became perceived as a buffer between the University and the surrounding community.

In 1970, the University proposed to construct a parking lot behind Von Cramm Hall. This proposal was dropped after by protests led by Gordon G. Chang.

== 2005 controversy ==
=== Background ===
As part of its "West Campus Residential Initiative," Cornell decided to relocate approximately 176 parking spots to the area occupied by the Redbud Woods, about 2 blocks from the new dorms. However, in 2001, the Ithaca Common Council named Redbud Woods a historic district. The University sued the city, and in 2005, the New York State Supreme Court's Appellate division ruled in Cornell's favor, allowing construction of the parking lot to proceed.

=== Points of view ===
In the fall of 2004, then University President Jeffrey Lehman had presented three challenges to the University, the third of which was sustainability. Lehman went on to more fully articulate Cornell's "institutional commitment to sustainability." Some, including many Cornell faculty, students and Ithaca community members, argued that paving a historic urban green space for a surface parking lot was unsustainable. They suggested that parking needs might be satisfied elsewhere on campus and be further mitigated through demand management, promotion of public transit, and planning.

Those in opposition to construction of the lot also argued that paving the woods might increase localized flooding and allow for the leakage of toxic materials, for example motor oil, into the storm sewer system and ultimately into Cayuga Lake, which supplies drinking water for many living in Tompkins County.

Major protests around the construction of the parking lot continued through the summer of 2005, including the occupation of President Jeffrey Lehman's office on April 28, 2005 by eight students, as well as a protracted direct action occupation of the woods themselves by students, faculty, and community members, in opposition to what appeared to be imminent destruction. Notably, former Ithaca mayor, and Cornell professor emeritus, Ben Nichols was cited during protests against the deforestation plan.

=== Final agreement ===
On July 18, 2005, Cornell University interim president Hunter Rawlings visited Redbud Woods and signed an agreement between the University and many of the Redbud protesters, effectively ending the dispute, although some independent protests continued. Along with a pledge by Cornell to offer free travel passes for buses to all new students entering the University in the fall of 2005 and 2006 who did not purchase parking permits, the agreement included commitments on the university's part to involve the community more in administration decisions, as well as to engage in constructive dialogue concerning sustainability on campus. By August 2005 several thousand new students had taken advantage of the free travel passes, which helped to raise demand on the Tompkins Consolidated Area Transit bus system that services Ithaca and the rest of the county

== Media documentation ==
The New York Times published three articles about the Redbud Woods controversy in June and July 2005. The Ithaca Journal and The Cornell Daily Sun published many articles over the course of 2004–2005 about the protests.

== Aftermath ==
A key point in the negotiated agreement signed by student protesters (but not community members) was that students receive free travel passes to encourage sustainable transportation. Cornell began this process for incoming students during the semester immediately following the occupation for incoming students, adding to free passes which were already provided to transfer and graduate students. Two years later, free passes for graduate, transfer, and sophomore students were eliminated, and the program only offered going forward to first year students.

A faculty and community committee proposed a memorial plaque to the Ithaca Common Council in early 2006, to be placed on public land adjacent to the parking lot. Despite opposition from Cornell University, the City of Ithaca approved the plaque on July 5, 2006, and it was installed later that year. The plaque reads:

Redbud Woods

The land before you was once home to the extended family of Robert H. Treman, creator of parks and protector of green spaces throughout Tompkins County. The woodland that grew up here was inhabited for decades by diverse fauna and more than fifty plant species, including numerous redbud trees. Redbud Woods was razed on July 20, 2005 by the Cornell administration to build a parking lot.

This plaque has been erected by Ithaca community members in memory of this cherished woodland.

Remember the trees…
Remember all who tried to save them.
