= Benjamin Nichols =

American politician

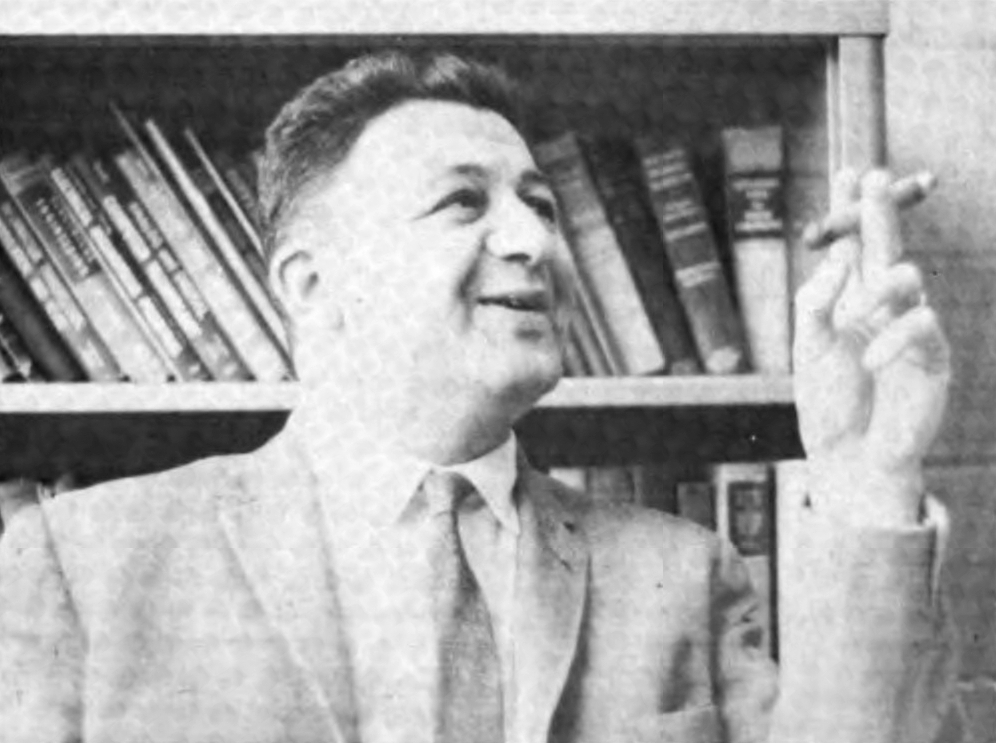
Nichols as professor of electrical engineering at Cornell University, 1961

Benjamin Nichols (1920 – November 24, 2007) was a professor of electrical and computer engineering at Cornell University and mayor of Ithaca, New York. He was a member of the Democratic Socialists of America and as such was one of few Socialists elected to public office in the United States in the late 20th century.

== Early life ==
Nichols was born on Staten Island in 1920 to a family of politically active Communist Party members. Nichols's family was active in union organizing and supporting the Republican cause in the Spanish Civil War. He enrolled at Cornell in 1937, but his studies were interrupted by his service in the United States Army during World War II. In 1946, he received his B.S. in electrical engineering, and later received an M.S. in 1949. He earned a PhD at the University of Alaska in 1956.

== Professorship ==
He was admitted to the Cornell faculty as an assistant professor in 1949, but left temporarily to earn his Ph.D. In 1953, he became an associate professor and a full professor in 1959. Initially, his work at Cornell focused on radio waves in the ionosphere, but after he grew concerned that his studies would lead to military applications, his pacifist beliefs caused him to change his field of study to science education. In this field he developed new techniques in primary school science education.

In addition to the duties of his professorship, Nichols was very active in the administration of the University. He vocally championed the social justice vision of the University and was closely allied with the nascent Africana Studies department. He was one of the first speakers of the Cornell University Senate, a governing body during the 1970s a which included faculty, student, and employee representatives.

With Professor Michael Kelley, he published in 1989 an introductory engineering textbook entitled Introductory Linear Electrical Circuits and Electronics. He retired on July 1, 1988 as Professor Emeritus.

== Mayoralty ==
Nichols was elected to the Ithaca Common Council in 1987, and was first elected mayor of Ithaca in 1989. He was elected to two more two-year terms, narrowly losing in his bid for a fourth term after helping to push through legislation increasing mayoral terms to four years. As mayor, Nichols was able to convince Cornell University (whose campus is tax-exempt) to increase their voluntary monetary contribution to the city in order to help pay for fire and emergency services which are normally supported only through property taxes. He also led the effort to extend domestic benefits to same-sex couples who worked for the city.

After retiring as mayor in 1995, Nichols remained active in local and Cornell affairs. He worked for the Cornell Institute for African Development and was cited for protesting the construction of a parking lot over an area of Redbud trees.

Nichols was married to Ethel Baron, who died in 1991. In 1995 he married Judith Van Allen, who survived him. He was also survived by his two children, Mary and Jeff, five grandchildren, and 3 great-grandchildren. His daughter Mary D. Nichols became the head of the California Air Resources Board.

== See also ==
- List of Democratic Socialists of America who have held office in the United States
- List of mayors of Ithaca, New York

Preceded by John Gutenberger	Mayor of Ithaca, New York; 1989—1995	Succeeded by Alan Cohen
