= Mary D. Nichols =

American attorney and government official

Mary Nichols
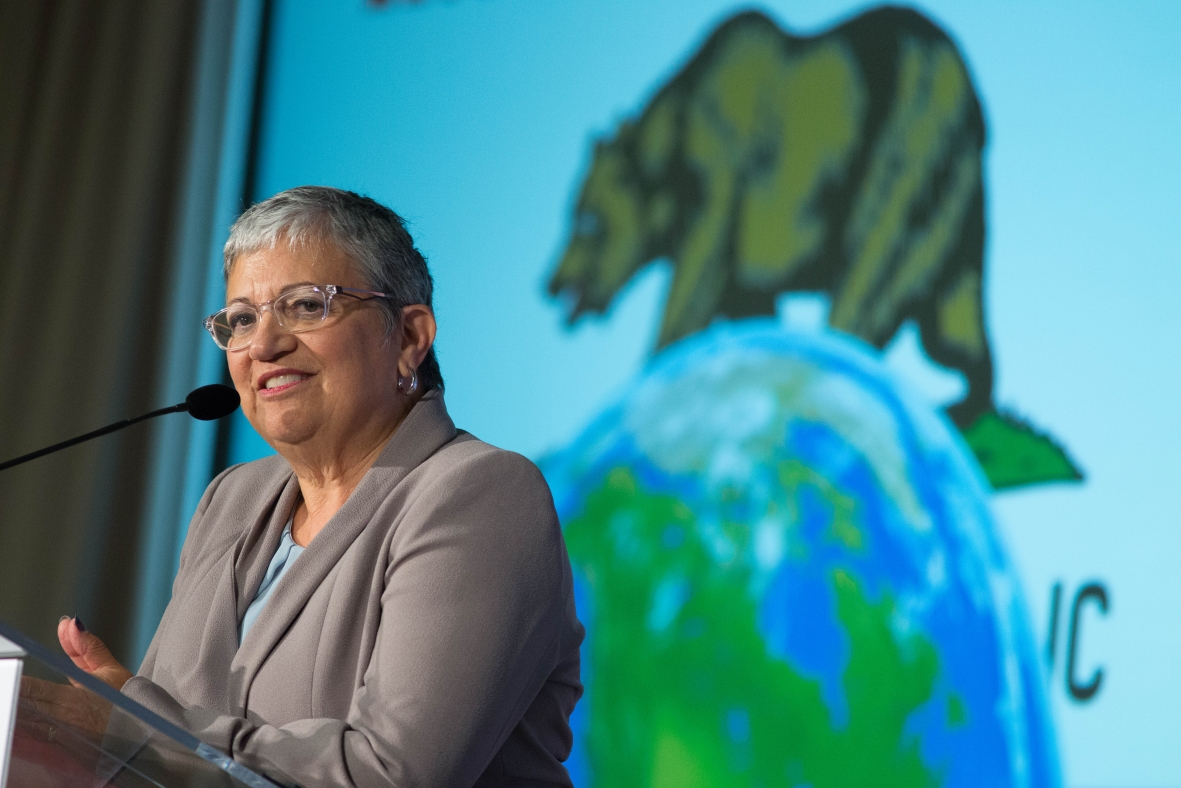

Chair of the California Air Resources Board
- In office 2007–2020
- Governor: Arnold Schwarzenegger; Jerry Brown; Gavin Newsom
- Preceded by: Robert Sawyer
- Succeeded by: Liane Randolph
- In office 1979–1983
- Governor: Jerry Brown
- Preceded by: Thomas Quinn
- Succeeded by: Gordon W. Duffy

Secretary of the California Natural Resources Agency
- In office 1999–2003
- Governor: Gray Davis
- Preceded by: Douglas Wheeler
- Succeeded by: Mike Chrisman

Personal details
- Born: Mary Dolores Nichols; April 1945 (age 81) Minneapolis, Minnesota, U.S.
- Party: Democratic
- Relatives: Benjamin Nichols (father)
- Education: Cornell University (BA); Yale University (JD)

Mary Dolores Nichols (born 1945) is an American attorney and government official who was the chairwoman of the California Air Resources Board (CARB) from 2007 to 2020. She also held that post between 1979 and 1983. From 1999 to 2003, she served as secretary of the California Natural Resources Agency in the cabinet of then-Governor Gray Davis. Due to her efforts to combat global warming, she has been dubbed "the Queen of Green", and described as "the most influential environmental regulator in history."

In November 2020, she was named a possible candidate for administrator of the Environmental Protection Agency. In December 2020, it was announced that Michael S. Regan would serve in the role.

== Early life and education ==
Nichols was born in Minneapolis, Minnesota in April 1945, and was raised in Ithaca, New York. Her father, Benjamin Nichols, was a professor at Cornell University and socialist mayor of Ithaca; while her mother, Ethel Baron Nichols, led the Ithaca public schools' foreign language department. Mary Nichols received her bachelor's degree from Cornell in 1966 and her Juris Doctor from Yale Law School in 1971, a time when few women enrolled in law school. She passed the State Bar of California and awarded license #52660 on June 2, 1972.

== Career ==
Her career as an environmental regulator began after Congress passed the Clean Air Act of 1970. Nichols moved with her husband, John Daum, to Los Angeles, to work for the Center for Law in the Public Interest.

In 1972, as a new lawyer in Los Angeles, California, at a small public interest firm, she was approached by the City of Riverside, California, where the highest levels of ozone had been recorded, about suing Los Angeles over its air pollution. Instead she brought this suit against the United States federal government, arguing that under the Clean Air Act, the United States Environmental Protection Agency must force California to develop a stringent plan to deal with air pollution in Los Angeles.

She was first appointed to the Air Resources Board by Governor Jerry Brown in 1975, and was made its chief four years later, upon the recommendation of then-chair Tom Quinn. After her first stint at CARB, she moved back to private law practice. In 1989, she founded the Los Angeles office of the Natural Resources Defense Council as a senior attorney. During the Clinton Administration, she worked at the United States Environmental Protection Agency as the assistant administrator of air and radiation. While at the USEPA, she ran a cap-and-trade program to reduce emissions of sulfur dioxide and acid rain, which she considers to be among her greatest achievements. In addition to her work at the Air Resources Board, she serves as faculty at the UCLA School of Law, and the Institute of the Environment & Sustainability at UCLA.

=== California Air Resources Board ===
In August 2007, Republican Governor of California Arnold Schwarzenegger appointed Nichols to head the California Air Resources Board, despite the fact that she was a Democrat, saying "Mary was quite simply the best person for the job." The primary job was to implement the Global Warming Solutions Act of 2006 and to build a low-carbon economy. The CARB implemented a market-based cap-and-trade program to reduce the state's emissions of carbon dioxide and other greenhouse gases back to 1990 levels by 2020. In 2010 Schwarzenegger was replaced by governor Jerry Brown, a close ally of Nichols.

Thanks in part to efforts by the CARB, California has successfully decoupled greenhouse gas emissions from economic growth. She was part of California's delegation to the 2015 United Nations Climate Change Conference in Paris, where she and other members of the Brown administration shared lessons on decarbonization with the rest of the world.

In 2020, CARB under the leadership of Nichols issued the Advanced Clean Trucks rule, which mandates that an increasing percentage of trucks sold in California be zero-emissions vehicles. Though the trucking lobby had argued for a delay in light of the effects of the COVID-19 pandemic in the United States, CARB voted to implement the rule. Nichols' leadership was likened to that of Captain David Farragut in the Battle of Mobile Bay, memorialized in the quote "Damn the torpedoes, full speed ahead!".

=== Possible role in Biden administration ===
Following the 2020 United States presidential election, Nichols was considered by President-elect Joe Biden for the role of administrator of the Environmental Protection Agency. Initially considered the frontrunner for the role, Biden instead nominated Michael S. Regan to the position, after 74 environmental justice activists based in California signed a letter urging him not to pick Nichols, arguing she had not done enough to assist low-income and minority communities.

As of 2021, she is a visiting fellow of the Columbia University Center on Global Energy Policy.
