= Susan Packard =

American TV executive

- Born: Detroit, Michigan
- Occupations: Businesswoman, author
- Known for: HGTV

Susan Packard is an American business executive and author who was a cofounder of HGTV, DYI Network and several other Scripps Networks Interactive (SNI) network channels.

Packard also worked on the startup teams of HBO and CNBC. She is the author of New Rules of the Game: 10 Strategies for Women in the Workplace. In 2019 she authored Fully Human, Three Steps to Grow Your Emotional Fitness for Work, Leadership, and Life.

== Early life and education ==
Susan Packard was born in Detroit, Michigan. During her secondary school summers, she worked for her father's direct mail business. After receiving her undergraduate degree in advertising from Michigan State University, in 1979 she graduated with a masters in advertising from the same school. She later completed an executive program at the University of Virginia.

In 2019 Packard was awarded an Honorary Doctorate of Humanities from Michigan State .

== Business career ==
Packard's first job out of graduate school was at Burke Marketing Research in Cincinnati. Packard started out in the cable programming television business with the sales division of HBO in 1980, eventually becoming a regional manager in charge of distributing HBO to cable operators. In 1984, Packard became the director of the HBO Los Angeles market. After this, she worked at NBC to help launch the network's cable properties beginning in 1988. Packard was on the start-up team of CNBC, where she served as the vice president of affiliate relations and national accounts.

In 1994 at E.W. Scripps Company, Packard helped cofound Home and Garden Television (HGTV), a place where she served as the chief operating officer until 2000. During this time she also cofounded the Scripps Networks, becoming the President of Scripp's New Ventures division in 2000. That year Packard was a co-founder of the Fine Living Network, which debuted in 2002.

Scripps eventually became Scripps Networks Interactive (SNI), where Packard served as executive vice president. In this role she also co-founded the DIY Network. The company grew to a $10 billion market valuation. In her final role before leaving SNI, Packard served as the Scripps Networks President of Brand Outreach. In addition to her business duties, she aligned Scripps corporate citizenship with external organizations, including Mobile Meals and Habitat for Humanity.

Packard was the first woman to serve on the board of Churchill Downs, Inc. She served for two terms, from 2004 to 2010.

== Books ==
In 2015 Packard wrote the book New Rules of the Game: 10 Strategies for Women in the Workplace, which applies the concept of “gamesmanship” for the use of women in their careers. The book “cultivates creativity, focus, optimism, teamwork and competitiveness,” according to San Diego Metro. In the book Packard uses personal anecdotes from the breadth of her career as well as stories about other businesspeople who successfully managed various competitive situations. These were taken with interviews that Packard did with c-level executives or company presidents, nine of which were women and three were men. Packard advises on issues surrounding competition in the workplace. New Rules of the Game is intended to serve as a guide for women looking to take on leadership positions in business.

Packard's second book, Fully Human, 3 Steps to Grow Your Emotional Fitness for Work, Leadership, and Life, looks at emotional intelligence and how it can propel the reader to find fulfillment and success. She uses lessons from her career as well experiences of many others that she interviewed for the book, from all levels of various organizations.

== Recognition ==
Packard was inducted into the Cable Hall of Fame in 2008. She has also received awards including the Women in Cable & Telecommunications Woman of the Year award, YWCA Tribute to Women Award, and E.W. Scripps William R. Burleigh Award for Distinguished Community Service.
