= Svante Myrick =

American politician

Mayor of Ithaca
- In office January 1, 2012 – February 6, 2022
- Preceded by: Carolyn K. Peterson
- Succeeded by: Laura Lewis (Acting)

Personal details
- Born: March 15, 1987 (age 39) Florida, U.S.
- Party: Democratic
- Education: Cornell University (AB)

Svante L. Myrick (born March 15, 1987) is an American politician who formerly served as the mayor of Ithaca, New York. He is a member of the Democratic Party.

Raised in the town of Earlville, New York, Myrick was elected to the Ithaca Common Council in 2007 while he was a student at Cornell University. After graduating from Cornell in 2009, Myrick ran for mayor of Ithaca in 2011; he defeated two candidates in the Democratic primary and won the general election with 54.9% of the vote. Upon taking office in 2012 at age 24, Myrick became the city's youngest mayor and its first mixed race mayor. Myrick is known for his 2016 proposal to create a city-run supervised heroin injection site. He was re-elected in 2015 and 2019. On January 5, 2022, Myrick announced that he had accepted an offer to serve as Executive Director of People for the American Way. On January 1, 2023, Myrick assumed the role of president and CEO of People for the American Way.

== Early life and education ==
Born on March 15, 1987, Myrick has three siblings. Myrick's father, Jessie, is black; his mother, Leslie, is white. During his infancy, Myrick and his family experienced periodic homelessness. Jessie Myrick's struggles with an addiction to crack cocaine led Leslie Myrick to move her four children from Florida to Earlville, New York, a small village of 900. Myrick was raised in Earlville by his mother and his maternal grandparents, Wilbur and Phyllis Raville. Myrick's family depended on food stamps, with Leslie Myrick working multiple jobs to provide for her children. Myrick attended public schools and graduated from Sherburne-Earlville High School in 2005. He had asthma while in high school.

Myrick then studied communication at Cornell University, where he was a member of Sigma Alpha Epsilon and a leader of the Interfraternity Council and Quill and Dagger society. He began his public-service career though volunteer activities while a student, including working with the REACH program (Raising Education Attainment Challenge) and the Ithaca Youth Council. Myrick graduated from Cornell in 2009.

== Political career ==
=== Ithaca Common Council (2008–2011) ===
Myrick was elected to the Ithaca Common Council at age 20 in 2007. When he took office in January 2008 (still aged 20), Myrick became the youngest alderperson in the history of the City of Ithaca; he began serving on the Common Council while still a student at Cornell. Myrick's principal contributions while serving as a councilman included forwarding a successful effort to create a "tobacco-free zone" on the Ithaca Commons, promoting youth involvement in city government through overseeing the creation of the Ithaca Youth Council, and playing a role in master planning and zoning changes in Ithaca's dense, student-dominated Collegetown neighborhood.

=== Mayor of Ithaca (2012–2022) ===
On March 29, 2011, Myrick declared his intent to pursue the office of Mayor of Ithaca as a Democrat. In the primary election, he defeated Alderperson J. R. Claiborne and County Legislator Pamela Mackesey. As the Democratic Party nominee, Myrick faced concerns about his age, experience, connection to the community and capability. Myrick earned 54.9% of votes cast in the November general election (a 28.5% margin from the nearest candidate), winning all city voting districts. Myrick defeated Janis Kelly (Republican Party candidate), J. R. Clairborne (Independence Party candidate), and Wade Wykstra (Independent).

Myrick became the City of Ithaca's youngest mayor and first mayor of color when he was sworn into office on January 1, 2012 at age 24. He also became the youngest mayor in the history of the State of New York. When Myrick assumed office, he inherited an anticipated $3 million to $3.5 million budget deficit in the City of Ithaca. His first city budget, the budget for fiscal year 2013, concentrated on maintaining city services while streamlining City Hall through merging departments, reducing management and adopting new technology systems. The budget also prioritized increasing the wages of the City's lowest-paid employees.

On June 6, 2013, Myrick delivered the keynote address at the 13th Annual New York State Supportive Housing Conference. The address touched on issues of race and on Myrick's personal history of homelessness. On October 1, 2013, the City of Ithaca became a Certified Living Wage Employer. On December 5, 2013, Myrick participated in the White House Mayor's Manufacturing Summit. Nearly 20 mayors from across the U.S. attended to meet with other local government leaders and share their concerns and ideas for manufacturing progress in their local communities.

The City's adopted fiscal year 2014 budget successfully closed the deficit Myrick had inherited in 2012 and brought about the lowest tax levy increase in over a decade.

Myrick joined President Obama during the annual U.S. Conference of Mayors Winter Meeting in January 2015. Administration officials discussed ways in which to continue partnering with cities to raise wages and incomes, to strengthen the standing of working families in a new economy and to bolster and expand the middle class.

On August 15, 2015, Myrick was invited to join people from 180 countries in the conference of the World Economic Forum in Geneva, Switzerland, for a meeting of the Global Shapers' Community to promote local change for global impact.

Myrick has said that his father's struggles with drug addiction helped inspire him to create a committee to confront the heroin problem. After nearly two years of research, the Municipal Drug Policy Committee formed in April 2014 by Myrick released "The Ithaca Plan: A Public Health and Safety Approach to Drugs and Drug Policy". The Plan proposed to create a Law Enforcement Assisted Diversion program (LEAD) in which police officers "divert people directly into the social service system" instead of perpetuating the revolving-door system of incarceration for low-level offenses. The 64-page Plan is centered on several tenets: Prevention, treatment, law enforcement, harm reduction, governance and leadership. On February 25, 2016, Ithaca proposed to create the country's first supervised heroin injection site. The proposal received local and national attention.

On April 19 and 22, 2013, Myrick joined forces with student organizers of the Youth Power Summit 2013 at Ithaca College Center for Business and Sustainable Enterprise, a climate justice convergence for young people from Tompkins County. He met with students to discuss divestment.

Myrick was re-elected in 2015 with 89% of the vote. On March 6, 2019, Myrick announced his intent to seek a third term as mayor, and won re-election with 76% of the vote. On January 5, 2022, Myrick announced that he had accepted an offer to serve as Executive Director of People for the American Way.

== Awards and honors ==
On December 10, 2014, Myrick was named as a recipient of the John F. Kennedy New Frontier Awards at the John F. Kennedy Presidential Library and Museum, created by the John F. Kennedy Library Foundation and The Institute of Politics at Harvard University to honor Americans under the age of 40 who are changing their communities and the country with their commitment to public service.

In 2016, Politico asked 71 mayors from all around the country to rate each other in a variety of categories. Myrick "received votes for most innovative, biggest turnaround and a mayor to 'keep our eye on'".

== See also ==
- List of mayors of Ithaca, New York
- List of first African-American mayors

Political offices
Preceded by Carolyn K. Peterson	Mayor of Ithaca; 2012–2022	Succeeded by Laura Lewis; Acting
