= Carolyn K. Peterson =

American politician

Mayor of Ithaca, New York
- In office January 1, 2004 – December 31, 2011
- Preceded by: Alan J. Cohen
- Succeeded by: Svante Myrick

Member of Common Council
- In office January 1, 1984–December 31, 1991; January 1, 2002–December 31, 2003

Personal details
- Party: Democratic
- Committees: USEPA Local Government Advisory Committee member

Carolyn K. Peterson was Ithaca, New York's first female mayor, first elected in 2003 and reelected in 2007. She is a member of the Democratic Party, and her term ended on December 31, 2011.

== History of same-sex marriage in New York State ==
On February 27, 2004, New Paltz Mayor Jason West married 25 same-sex couples before a cheering crowd, in front of the Village Hall.

These weddings, coming on the heels of San Francisco's mayor Gavin Newsom led other New York mayors to act. On February 27, 2004, Nyack mayor John Shields announced that he would recognize the New Paltz marriages and on March 1, 2004, Ithaca's mayor Carolyn K. Peterson declared that she would recognize same-sex marriages performed in other jurisdictions.

== See also ==
- List of mayors of Ithaca, New York

Political offices
| Preceded by Alan J. Cohen | Mayor of Ithaca, New York; 2004—2011 | Succeeded by Svante Myrick |
