= The Benham Brothers =

American Christian twins (born 1975)

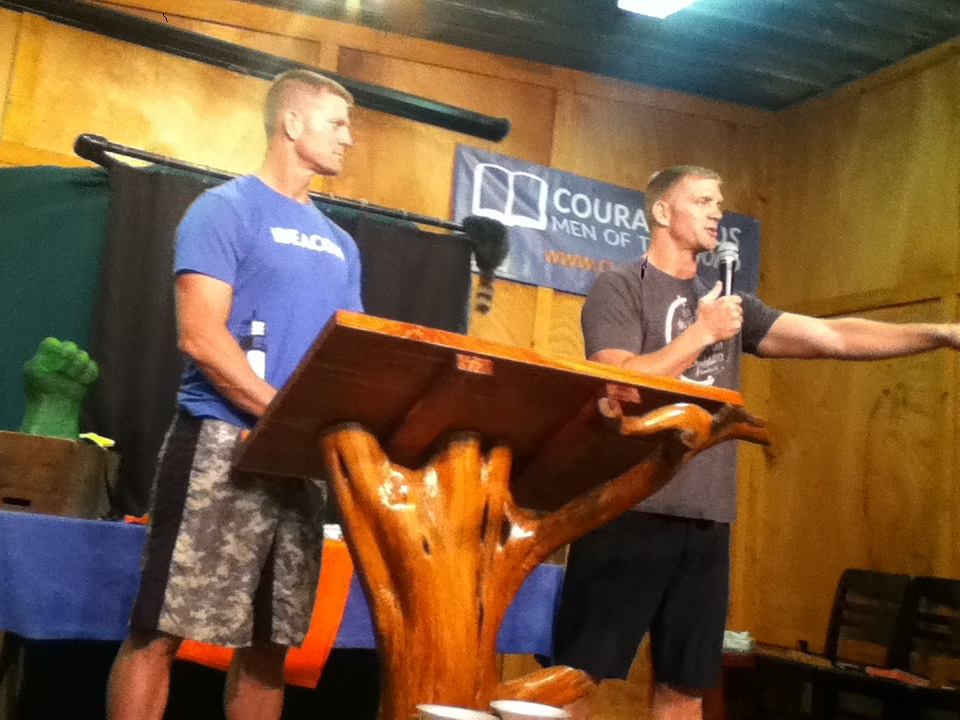
- Born: 1975 (age 50–51)
- Occupations: Former baseball players, former television hosts, authors, motivational speakers
- Known for: Real Estate
- Notable work: Authors of Whatever the Cost, Living Among Lions and Miracle in Shreveport
- Television: HGTV
- Parent: Philip "Flip" Benham
- Website: benhambrothers.com

David Benham and Jason Benham are American identical twin brothers who are authors, speakers, real estate entrepreneurs, former Minor League Baseball players, and filmmakers known for their conservative Christian views.

== Education and baseball careers ==
David and Jason Benham both graduated from Liberty University.

David Benham was drafted by the Boston Red Sox and played in both the Red Sox farm system and the St. Louis Cardinals farm system. Jason Benham was drafted by the Baltimore Orioles and later moved to the St. Louis Cardinals farm system.

== Real estate, business, and media careers ==
After finishing college, the Benham Brothers began working in real estate in Charlotte, North Carolina.

The brothers had little success until a bank contacted them to work on a foreclosed home; their work on this project led to more jobs. In 2003, the brothers co-founded BENHAM Real Estate Group, which focuses on bank listings and preparing foreclosed homes for resale. They also operate Redwood Realty Group focused on residential homes in the greater Charlotte, North Carolina area.

The brother established a business-focused podcast in 2020 and promoted a venture called "Expert Ownership" which they promoted in an appearance on American Family Radio.

=== Missioneering ===
The brothers are practicing Christians. In 2010, the brothers devised an alternative, for-profit model for Christian mission work they termed "missioneering".

In 2014, the brothers' "missioneering" projects, specifically virtual assistant and business services, supported missionary work in the Philippines by hiring and training 300 employees to offer. The brothers also opened CrossFit gyms in North Carolina.

=== Flip it Forward: HGTV ===
In April 2014, HGTV announced it was planning to premier a home improvement reality television show featuring the brothers called Flip It Forward, to debut in fall 2014.

The following month, People for the American Way's Right Wing Watch published a report that criticized David Benham as an anti-gay, anti-abortion "extremist." The group criticized statements by David Benham at a protest outside of the 2012 Democratic National Convention in Charlotte, North Carolina in which Benham told conservative talk radio host Janet Mefferd that "homosexuality and its agenda" was "attacking the nation" and that "demonic ideologies" were infiltrating "our universities and our public school systems." The report also cited David Benham's work in support of North Carolina Amendment 1, a 2012 referendum to place a ban on same-sex marriage and civil unions in the North Carolina constitution; his comparison of same-sex marriage with Nazi Germany; his leadership of prayer walks and gatherings outside abortion clinics; and his anti-Muslim activism. The day after the report was published, HGTV canceled the brothers' series over their controversial remarks.

Despite the cancellation of the program, HGTV provided the funding for the brothers to finish their work on the six Charlotte-area homes connected to the cancelled show.

=== Filmography ===
The Benhams are credited in a number of Christian films. Jason Benham was credited in The Reliant (2019), Life Changes Everything: Discover Zac Ryan (2017), and War Room (2015). David Benham was credited in the same three films plus Courageous (2011).

== 2020 legal case ==
David Benham is the president of Cities4Life, a pro-life activist group. In April 2020, Benham was one of eight people who were arrested by the Charlotte-Mecklenburg Police Department after refusing to leave a protest outside an abortion clinic after being cited for violating COVID-19 restrictions on mass gatherings. Benham denied that he had violated the restriction, contending that there were not 50 people "gathered" outside of the clinic. The charges against Benham were dropped. Benham, Cities4Life, Global Impact Ministries, represented by the conservative Christian legal group Alliance Defending Freedom, subsequently sued the city, alleging a violation of First Amendment rights.

== Personal lives ==
David and his wife, Lori, have five children; Jason and his wife, Tori, have four children; both families reside in Charlotte, North Carolina.

== Bibliography ==
- Whatever the Cost: Facing Your Fears, Dying to Your Dreams, and Living Powerfully. Thomas Nelson, 2015. ISBN 0718032993
- Living Among Lions: How to Thrive like Daniel in Today's Babylon. Thomas Nelson, 2016. ISBN 0718076419
- Miracle in Shreveport. Thomas Nelson, 2018. ISBN 0785215980
- Bold and Broken: Becoming the Bridge Between Heaven and Earth. Salem Books, 2019 ISBN 1621579166
- Expert Ownership: Launching Faith-Filled Entrepreneurs into Greater Freedom and Success. Benham Media, 2021 ISBN 1736807005
- Bold and Broken (revisited): Speaking Truth Without Backing Down. Showing Love Without Letting Go. Benham Media, 2025 ISBN 979-8-9923386-6-9
