= California Department of Forestry and Fire Protection =

Agency in California

Operational area
- Country: United States
- State: California

Agency overview
- Established: 1885
- Employees: 12,522 total: 6,773 full-time firefighters; 2,775 seasonal firefighters; 2,974 support personnel
- Annual budget: $4.2 billion (2024–2025)
- Fire chief: Joe Tyler
- EMS level: ALS

Facilities and equipment
- Stations: 240 owned/operated 332 operated under contract
- Engines: 356 owned/operated 624 operated
- Bulldozers: 60
- Airplanes: 26 air tankers 19 tactical
- Helicopters: 23

Website
- calfire.ca.gov

The California Department of Forestry and Fire Protection (colloquially known as CAL FIRE) is the fire department of the California Natural Resources Agency in the U.S. state of California. It is responsible for fire protection in various areas under state responsibility totaling 31 million acres, as well as the administration of the state's private and public forests. In addition, the department provides varied emergency services in 36 of the state's 58 counties via contracts with local governments. The department's current director is Joe Tyler, who was appointed March 4, 2022, by Governor of California Gavin Newsom.

== Operations ==
CAL FIRE's foremost operational role is to fight and prevent wildfires on 31 million acres of forestland in the state. The organization works in both suppression and prevention capacities on state land, and offers emergency services of various kinds in 36 out of California's 58 counties, through contracts with local governments. The organization also assists in response to a wide range of disasters and incidents, including earthquakes, water rescues, and hazardous material spills. The organization manages 14 Demonstration State Forests for timber production, recreation, and research.

In conjunction with the California Department of Corrections and Rehabilitation (CDCR), CAL FIRE uses thousands of incarcerated firefighters at 44 conservation camps throughout the state for fire prevention, fire suppression, and various maintenance and conservation projects. CAL FIRE works with employees of the California Conservation Corps since that agency's creation in a partnership for fire suppression duties, logistics and forestry management. CCC members are involved in job training programs as Type 1 Hand Crew firefighters, supervised by CAL FIRE personnel, in increasing prevalence to offset CDCR inmates as the incarcerated firefighter program is closed. Programs to control wood-boring insects and diseases of trees are under forestry programs managed by CAL FIRE. The vehicle fleet is managed from an office in Davis, California.

== Organizational structure ==
The largest and most visible part of CAL FIRE operations is fire protection. Operations are divided into 21 operational units, which geographically follow county lines. Each unit consists of the area of one or more counties. Operational units are grouped under either the North Region or South Region.

The Office of the State Fire Marshal (OSFM) is the CAL FIRE program that protects life and property through the development and application of fire prevention, engineering, training and education, and enforcement. The Office of the State Fire Marshal provides support through a variety of fire safety responsibilities including: regulating occupied buildings; controlling substances and products which may cause injuries, death and destruction by fire; providing statewide direction for fire prevention within wildland areas; regulating hazardous liquid pipelines; developing and reviewing regulations and building standards; and providing training and education in fire protection methods and responsibilities.

There are two CAL FIRE training centers. The original academy is the CAL FIRE Training Center in Ione, east of Sacramento. The second academy is at the Ben Clark Training Center in Riverside. Both centers host the Fire Fighter Academy (FFA). All CAL FIRE Fire Protection employees go through this academy once they become permanent employees. The Company Officer Academy (COA) is only held in Ione. All new company officers (Engineer, Captain, Forester I, etc.) attend this academy.

=== Rank structure ===
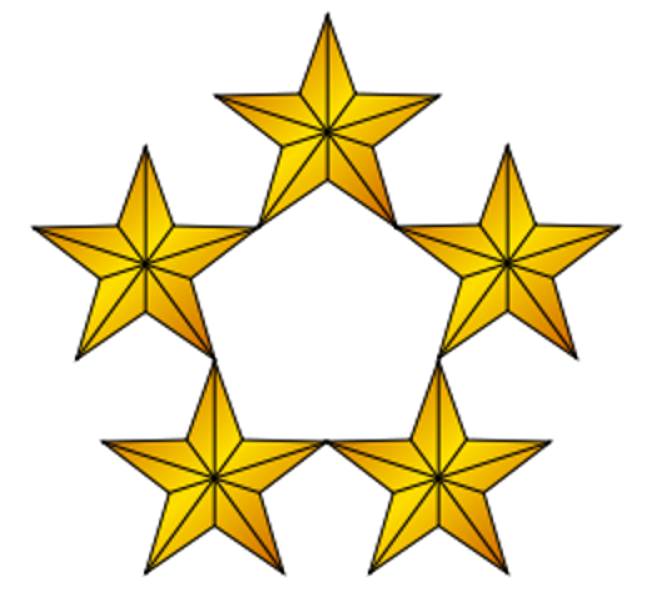
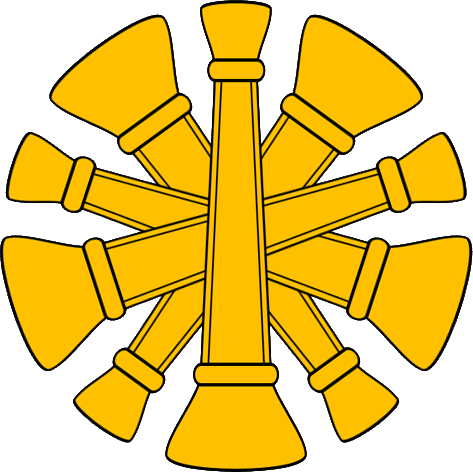
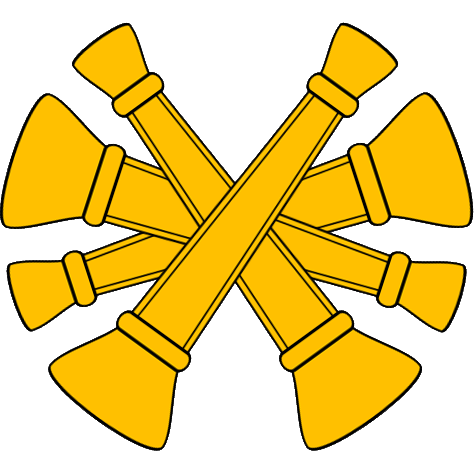
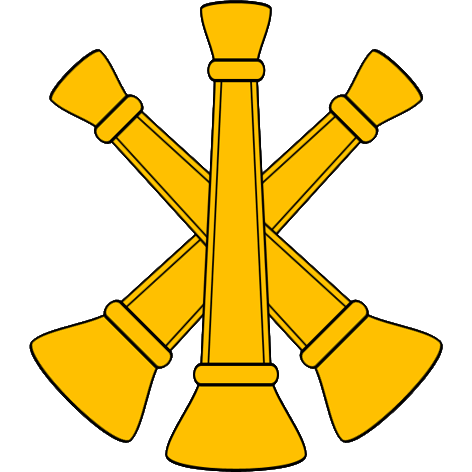
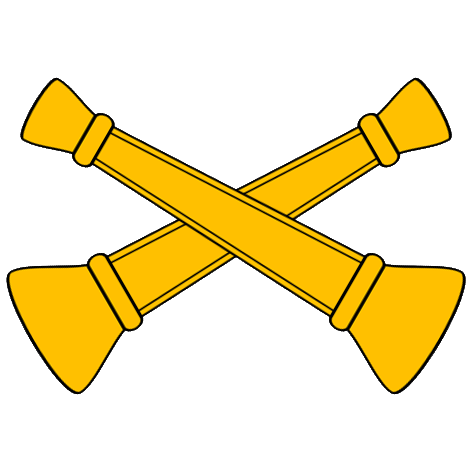
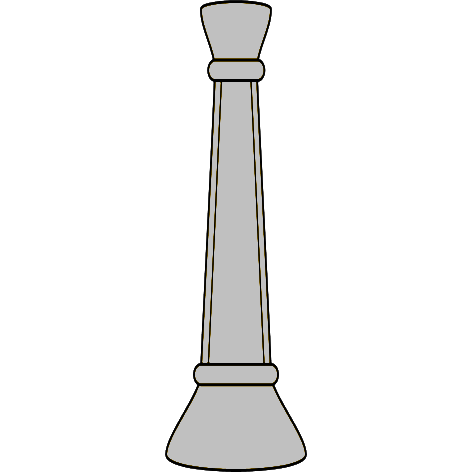
California Department of Forestry and Fire Protection												No Insignia
California Department of Forestry and Fire Protection	Director	Chief Deputy Director/ State Fire Marshal	Deputy Director/ Region Chief	Assistant Deputy Director/ Assistant Region Chief	Forestry and Fire Protection Administrator (Staff Chief)/ Senior Air Operations Officer	Unit Chief	Deputy Chief	Assistant Chief/ Division Chief	Battalion Chief	Fire Captain	Fire Apparatus Engineer	Firefighter II	Firefighter I	Probationary Firefighter

=== Leadership ===
The uniformed executive staff of CAL FIRE includes the following individuals.

- Director: Joe Tyler
- Chief Deputy Director: Anale Burlew
- State Fire Marshal: Daniel Berlant
- Assistant State Fire Marshal: Vickie Sakamoto
- Deputy Director, Communications/Incident Awareness: Nick Schuler
- Southern Region Chief: Mike van Loben Sels
- Northern Region Chief: George Morris III
- Deputy Director, Resource Management: Eric Huff
- Deputy Director, Cooperative Fire Protection: Matthew Sully
- Deputy Director, Fire Protection Programs: Jake Sjolund
- Deputy Director, Community Wildfire Preparedness & Mitigation and Fire Engineering & Investigations Division: Frank Bigelow

=== Pay ===
As of 2017, median pay for full time firefighters (which includes base pay, special pay, overtime and benefits) is $148,000.

=== Representation ===
Firefighters employed by the California Department of Forestry and Fire Protection are represented by IAFF affiliate, CAL FIRE Local 2881, which represents 5,700 members within CAL FIRE Local 2881 and is also associated with the California Professional Firefighters (CPF) and the International Association of Firefighters (IAFF).

=== Operational units ===
Operational units are organizations designed to address fire suppression over a geographic area. They vary widely in size and terrain.

For example, Lassen-Modoc-Plumas Operational Unit encompasses three rural counties and consists of eight fire stations, one Helitack Base, three conservation camps and an inmate firefighter training center. Fire suppression resources include 13 front-line fire engines, 1 helicopter, 3 bulldozers and 14 inmate fire crews. The unit shares an interagency emergency command center with federal agencies including the US Forest Service, National Park Service, and the Bureau of Land Management. An interagency center contributes to economies of scale, supports cooperation, and lends itself to a more seamless operation. The area has fragmented jurisdictions across a large rural area along the Nevada and Oregon state lines.

The Riverside Operational Unit (RRU) by itself would be considered one of the largest fire departments in the nation, with 95 fire stations and approximately 230 pieces of equipment. The Riverside Operational Unit operates as the Riverside County Fire Department under contract with Riverside County, as well as eighteen municipal fire departments and one community services district fire department. Nine of the stations in Riverside County belong to the state, while the rest are owned by their respective local government entity. The unit operates its own emergency command center in Perris. Terrain served includes urban and suburban areas of the Inland Empire and the desert communities in the metropolitan Palm Springs area. The area includes forested mountains, dry scrub forest, chaparral, agricultural land, the Colorado River basin, the Colorado Desert, the Mojave Desert, and Interstate 10 from the Los Angeles Metropolitan area to the Arizona state line.

The counties of Marin (MRN), Kern (KRN), Santa Barbara (SBC), Ventura (VNC), Los Angeles (LAC) and Orange (ORC) have an agreement with the state to provide fire protection for state responsibility areas within those counties rather than CAL FIRE providing direct fire protection, and are commonly known as the "Contract Counties".

Lawmakers in Sacramento have mandated that every operational unit develop and implement an annual fire management plan. The plan will develop cooperation and community programs to reduce damage from, and costs of, fires in California. One metric used by fire suppression units is initial attack success: fires stopped by the initial resources (equipment and personnel) sent to the incident.

==== Northern Region units and identifiers ====
- Amador-El Dorado Unit – AEU / 2700 (Including Sacramento and Alpine Counties)
- Butte Unit – BTU / 2100
- Humboldt-Del Norte Unit – HUU / 1200
- Lassen-Modoc-Plumas Unit – LMU / 2200 (Including Plumas County as of June 2008)
- Mendocino Unit – MEU / 1100
- Nevada-Yuba-Placer Unit – NEU / 2300 (Including Sutter and Sierra Counties)
- San Mateo-Santa Cruz Unit – CZU / 1700
- Santa Clara Unit – SCU / 1600 (Including Contra Costa, Alameda, Santa Clara, and parts of San Joaquin, and Stanislaus Counties)
- Shasta-Trinity Unit – SHU / 2400
- Siskiyou Unit – SKU / 2600
- Sonoma-Lake-Napa Unit – LNU / 1400 (Including Solano, Yolo, and Colusa Counties)
- Tehama-Glenn Unit – TGU / 2500

==== Southern Region units and identifiers ====
- Fresno-Kings Unit – FKU / 4300
- Madera-Mariposa-Merced Unit – MMU / 4200
- Riverside Unit – RRU / 3100
- San Benito-Monterey Unit – BEU / 4600
- San Bernardino Unit – BDU / 3500 (Including Inyo and Mono Counties)
- San Diego Unit – SDU / 3300 (Including Imperial County)
- San Luis Obispo Unit – SLU / 3400
- Tulare Unit – TUU / 4100
- Tuolumne-Calaveras Unit – TCU / 4400 (Including portions of San Joaquin, Stanislaus, and Alpine counties)

== Equipment ==
=== Apparatus ===
CAL FIRE uses various apparatus to accomplish their daily responses. Engines fall under two categories, either being state-owned or city/county owned, which CAL FIRE operates under contract.

For the wildland portion, most engines are manufactured with West-Mark or Westates (now American Truck & Fire Apparatus) bodies on an International chassis. Commonly seen models of wildland engines include the Model 14, and 15. CAL FIRE Models 24 and 25 were test-bed models, with only a few of each model fielded. The newest versions of these engines are CAL FIRE model 34 (4WD) and 35 (2WD), manufactured by Placer Fire Equipment, Rosenbauer, and HME. Model 34/35's are currently being fielded statewide. As of 2009 Model 35's have been discontinued and Model 34's from BME Apparatus are the new standard. Fact sheets on all of CAL FIRE's current-service Type 3 (wildland) engine models can be found on the CAL FIRE Web site under Mobile Equipment.

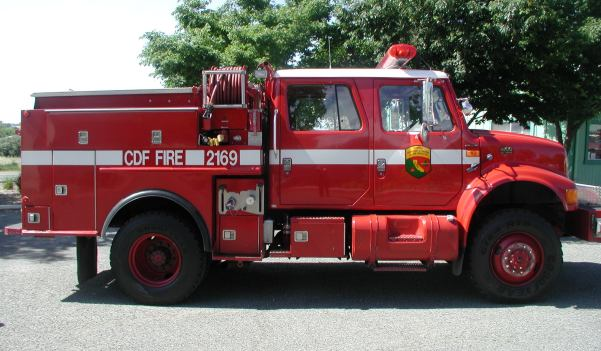
Type-3 Wildland Engine, CAL FIRE Model 14

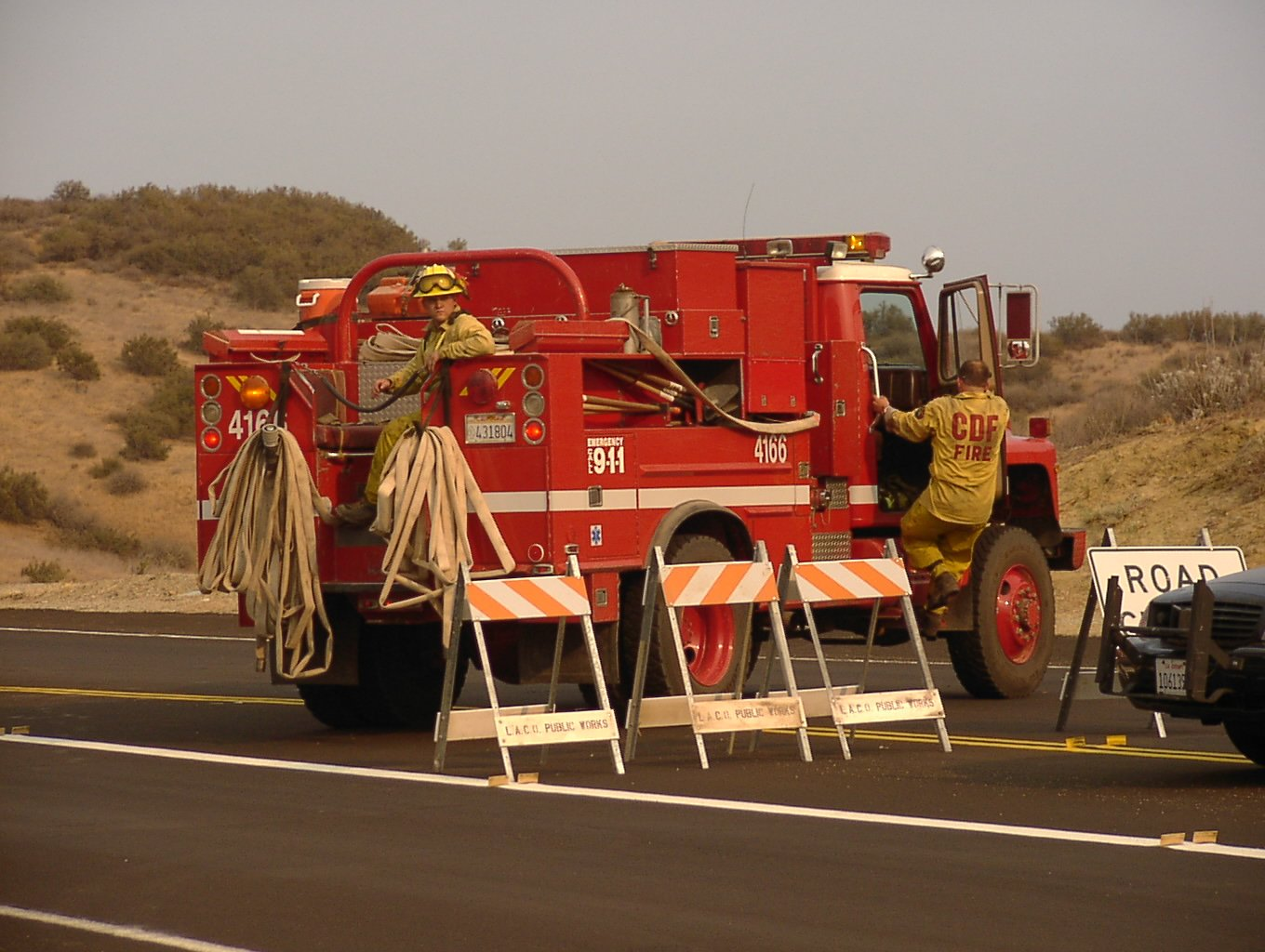
Type-3 Wildland Engine, CAL FIRE Model 5

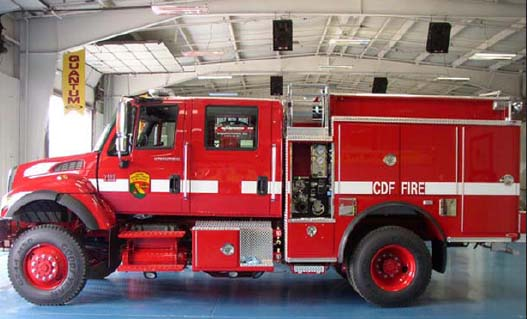
Type-3 Wildland Engine, CAL FIRE Model 24

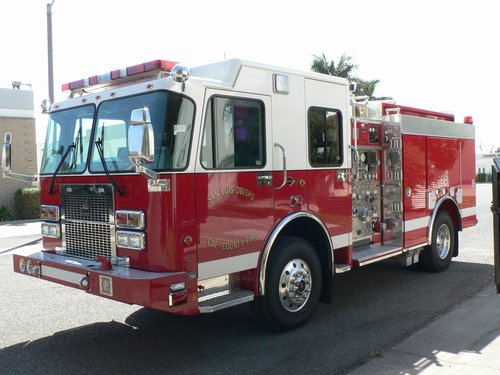
Smeal Type-1 Municipal Engine, owned by San Luis Obispo County and operated by CAL FIRE under contract

=== Air program ===
CAL FIRE owns its own fleet of air tankers, tactical aircraft and helicopters, which are managed under the Aviation Management Program. Additional aviation resources are leased by the department when needed. All of the fixed wing aircraft, while owned by CAL FIRE, are piloted and maintained by DynCorp International. The CAL FIRE Air Program is one of the largest non-military air programs in the country, consisting of 23 Grumman S-2 Tracker (S-2T version) 1,200 gallon fixed wing turboprop air tankers, seven Lockheed-Martin C-130H Hercules 4,000 gallon fixed-wing turboprop air tankers (in service in 2025), 14 North American Rockwell OV-10 Bronco fixed wing turboprop air tactical aircraft and 12 Bell UH-1H Super Huey helicopters. CAL FIRE has also now begun operating new Sikorsky S-70i Firehawk helicopters for aerial firefighting support including water drops and is planning to acquire up to 12 of these rotorcraft to replace the aging Bell UH-1H Super Huey fleet. From the 13 air attack and ten 10 helitack bases located statewide, aircraft can reach most fires within 20 minutes.

Aircraft are a prominent feature of CAL FIRE, especially during the summer fire season. Both fixed- and rotary-wing aircraft are employed. Helicopters (also known as rotorcraft or rotary wing aircraft) are used to transport firefighting "Helitack Crews" into fire areas. They also drop water and retardant chemicals on fires. Fixed-wing aircraft are used for command, observation, and to drop retardant chemicals on fires.

CAL FIRE contracted in the past with 10 Tanker Air Carrier for three years' of exclusive use of their McDonnell Douglas DC-10-10 heavy air tanker known as Tanker 910 for aerial firefighting at a cost of $5 million per year. Additional access was also provided to DC-10-30 air tankers, being Tanker 911 and Tanker 912. In 2014 Tanker 910 was retired; however, 10 Tanker Air Carrier continues to currently operate several DC-10-30 air tankers.

On October 7, 2014, a CAL FIRE S-2T air tanker crashed while fighting the Dog Rock Fire in Yosemite National Park. The pilot was killed.

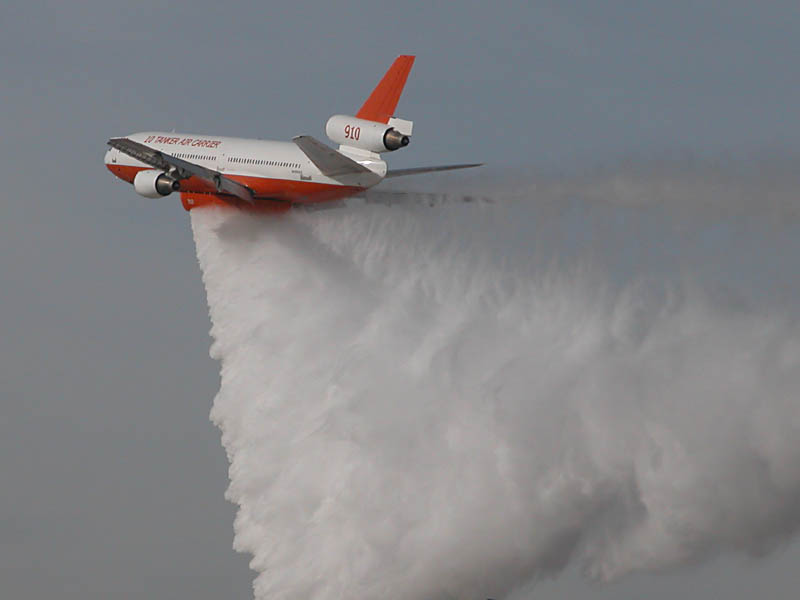
Tanker 910 during a drop demonstration in December, 2006

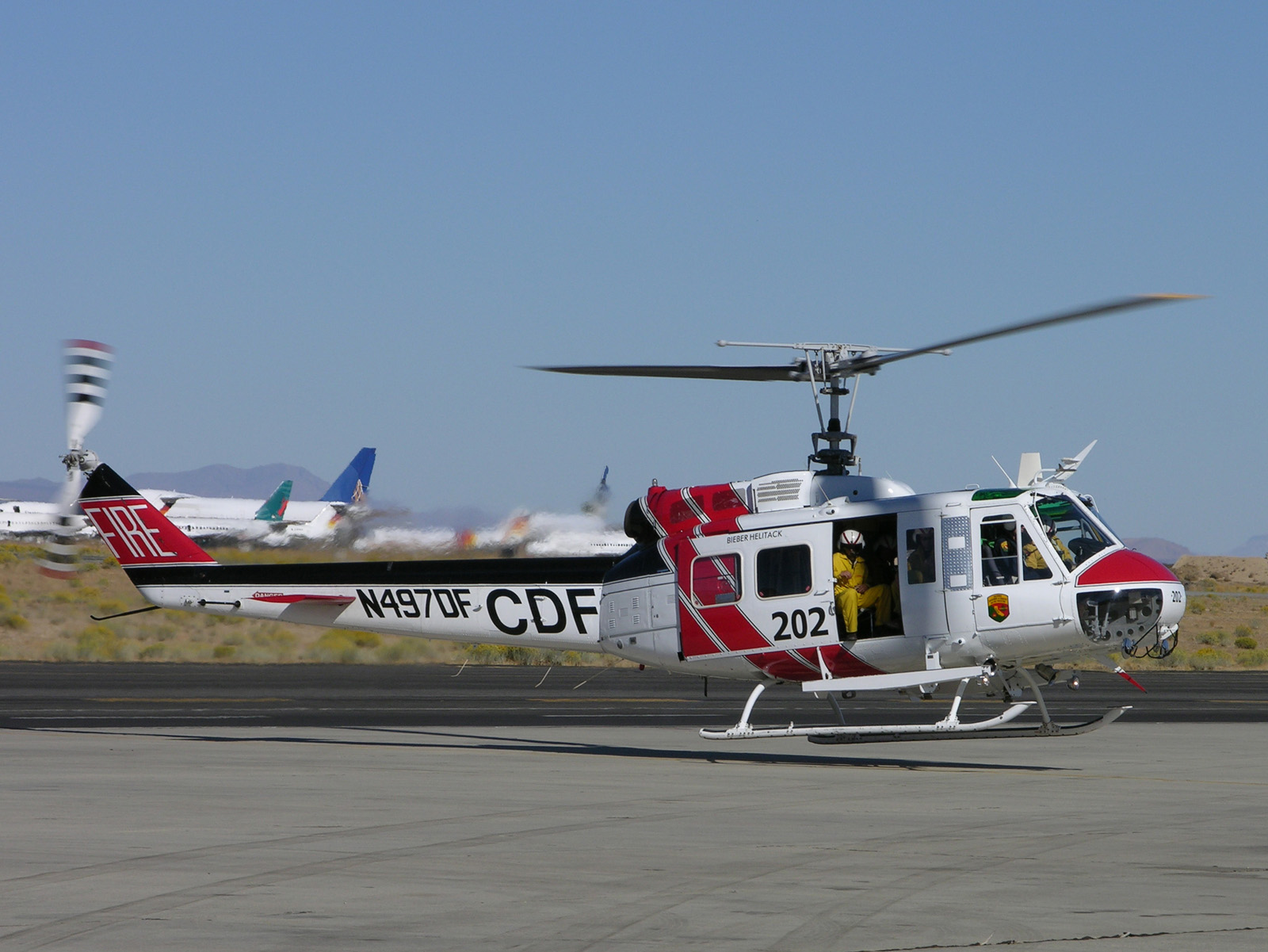
CAL FIRE "Super Huey", formerly an UH-1H, assigned to the Bieber Helitack crew, takes off from the Mojave Airport

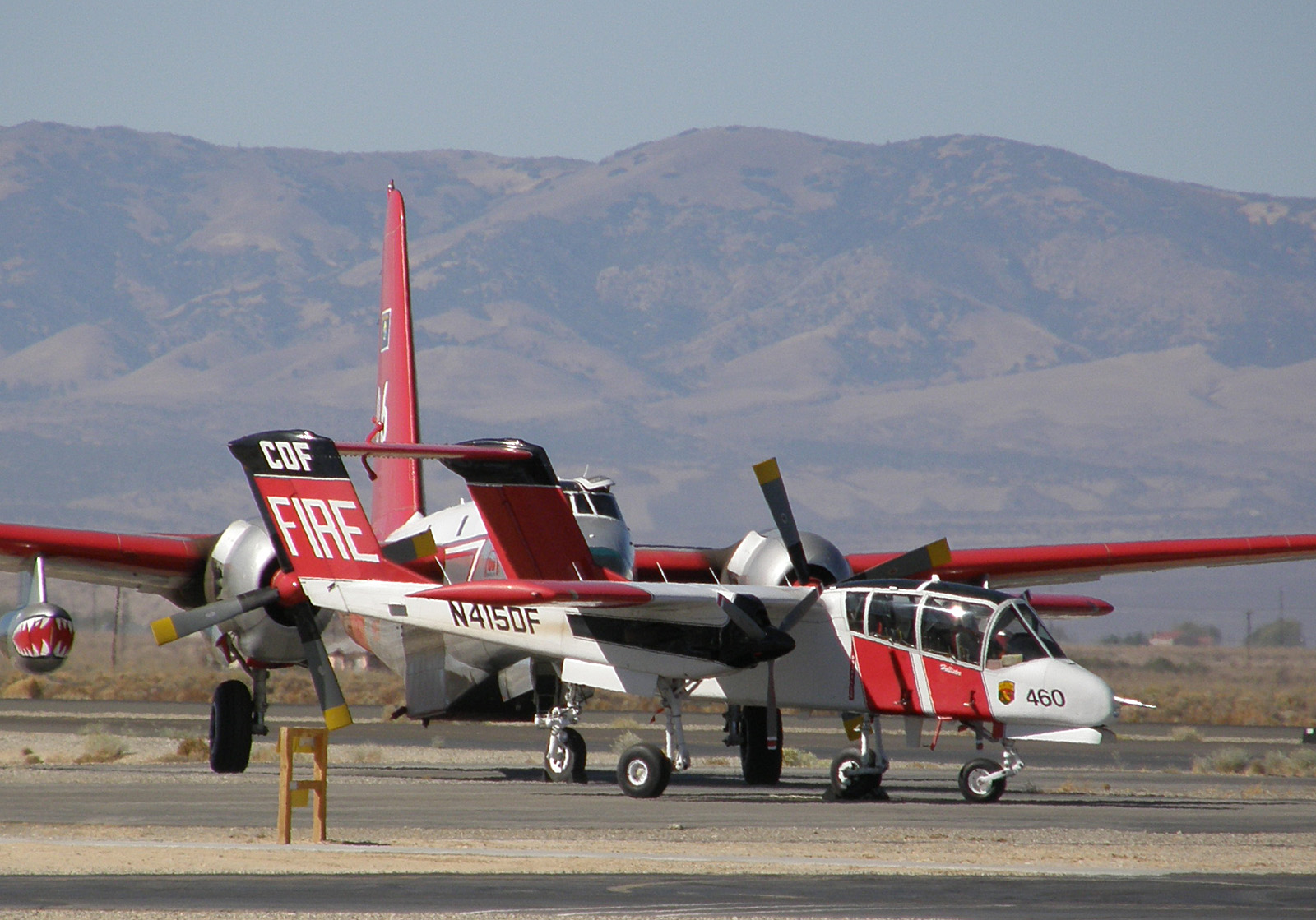
CAL FIRE OV-10 Bronco "Air Attack 460" at Fox Field during the October 2007 California wildfires

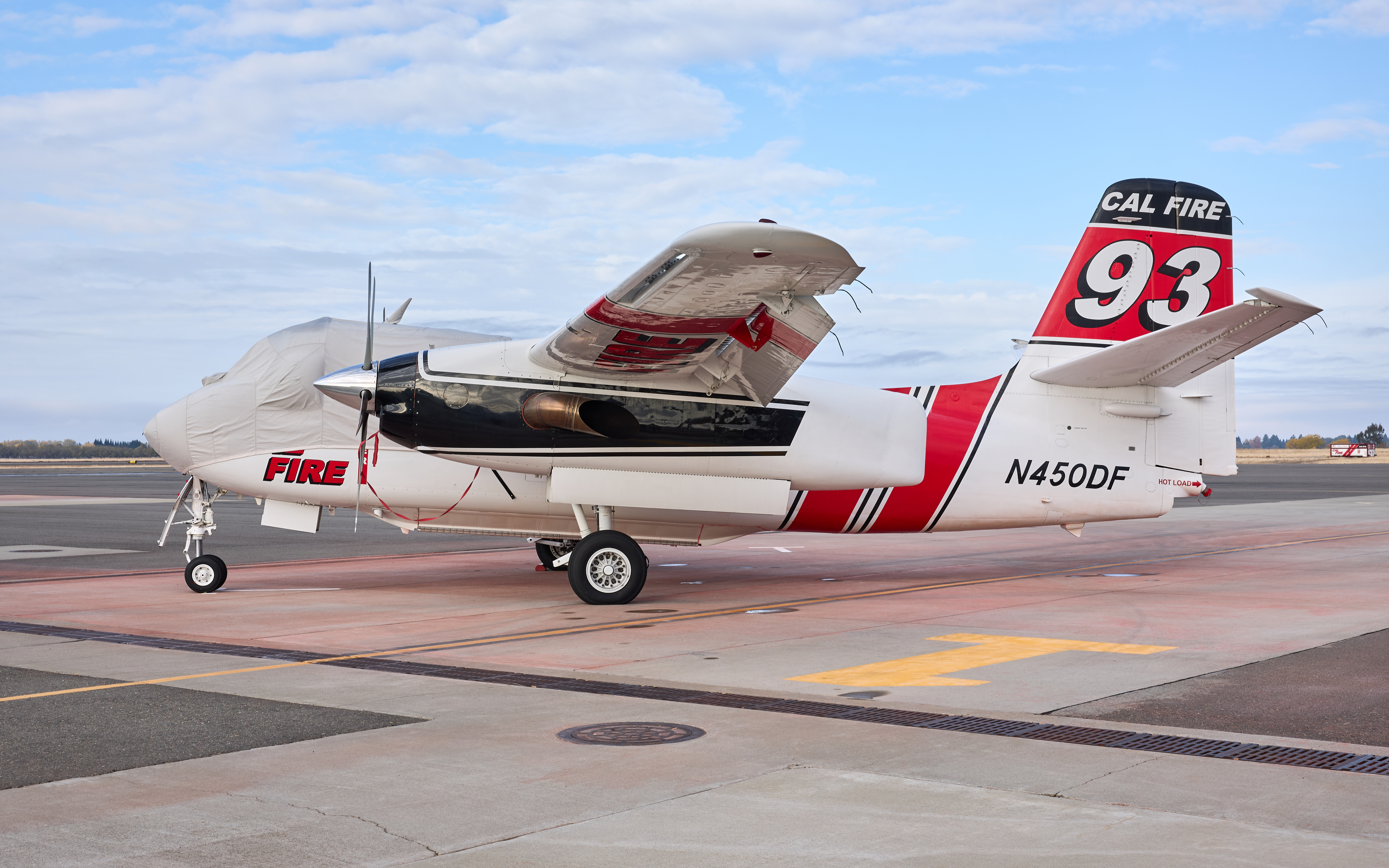
Tanker 93, a Grumman S-2T airtanker based at the CAL FIRE Chico Air Attack Base, at Chico Regional Airport (CIC) in Butte County, November 2024

=== Communications ===
CAL FIRE uses several enterprise IT systems to manage operations. Altaris Computer-Assisted Dispatch (CAD), made by Northrop Grumman, is employed by each unit's Emergency Command Center (ECC) to track available resources and assignments. This is made possible through the use of an automatic vehicle locating system which provides vehicle location, data communication, and dispatching through a mobile data terminal (MDT) and a multi-network switching system in over 1200 vehicles statewide. Each operational unit has a stand-alone system which includes detailed address and mapping information.

== Contract Counties ==
The department also provides varied emergency services in 36 of the state's 58 counties that don't have a fire department in the form contract counties which are the county equivalent of contract cities. The contract counties are Amador, Butte, Calaveras, Del Norte, El Dorado, Fresno, Glenn, Humboldt, Kings, Lake, Lassen, Madera (County), Marin, Mariposa, Mendocino, Merced, Modoc, Monterey, Napa, Placer, Riverside, Tehama, Trinity, Tulare, Tuolumne, San Benito, San Diego, San Luis Obispo, San Mateo, Santa Clara, Santa Cruz, Shasta, Siskiyou, Sonoma, Nevada (County) and Yuba via contracts with local governments.

== Contract Cities ==
The department also provides varied emergency services in 39 cities that don't have a fire department in the form contract cities some contract cities are located in non contract counties where counties have a fire department. The contract cities are Atwater, Auburn, Banning, Beaumont, Biggs, Calistoga, Coachella, Desert Hot Springs, Dos Palos, Eastvale, Gridley, Gustine, Highland, Indian Wells, Indio, Jurupa Valley, La Quinta, Lake Elsinore, Livingston, Madera (City), Menifee, Moreno Valley, Morgan Hill, Norco, Oroville, Palm Desert, Paradise, Perris, Pismo Beach, Rancho Mirage, Red Bluff, San Jacinto, Soledad, St. Helena, Temecula, Ukiah, Wildomar, Willows and Yucaipa via contracts with local governments.

== In popular culture ==
Fire Country is an American drama television series in which a young convict volunteers for the Conservation Camp Program and assists Cal Fire.

== See also ==
- California Conservation Corps
- California Department of Parks and Recreation
- FIRESCOPE
- Watch Duty
