= List of mayors of Ithaca, New York =

The following is a list of mayors of the city of Ithaca, New York, United States.

- David Barnes Stewart, Republican, 1888-March 1889
- John Barden, Democrat, March 1889-1891
- Henry Ancel St. John, Citizens, March 1891-1893
- Clinton Duane Bouton, No License (Non-Partisan), March 1893-1895
- Leroy G. Todd, Republican (High License), March 1895-1897
- John Barr Lang, Republican, March 1897-1899
- William Conrad Elmendorf, Democrat, March 1899-1901
- William Reuben Gunderman, Republican, March 1901-December 31, 1902
- George W. Miller, c.1903-1904
- Bradford Almy, c.1905-1906
- Jared T. Newman, c.1907-1908
- Randolph Horton, c.1909-1911
- John Reamer, c.1912
- John W. Presswick, c.1913
- Thomas Tree, c.1915
- Frederick E. Bates, c.1916-1917
- Edwin C. Stewart, 1920-1921
- Louis P. Smith, c.1922
- W. M. Sawdon, c.1925
- Fred B. Howe, c.1926-1929
- Herman Bergholtz, 1930-1934
- Louis P. Smith, c.1934-1935
- Joseph B. Myers, c.1936-1939
- Joseph Campbell, c.1940-1941
- Melvin G. Comfort, c.1942-1944
- James Conley, c.1946
- Arthur N. Gibb, c.1946-1947
- Bert T. Baker, c.1948-1949
- Ivan E. Cook, c.1952-1955
- John F. Ryan, c.1956-1959
- Hunna Johns, c.1965-1966
- Ed Conley, 1972-1979
- Raymond Bordoni, 1980-1981
- William Shaw, 1982-1983
- John Gutenberger, 1984-1989
- Benjamin Nichols, 1989-1995
- Alan J. Cohen, 1996-2003
- Carolyn K. Peterson, 2004-2011
- Svante Myrick, 2012-2022
- Laura Lewis, 2022-2023
- Ducson Nguyen, 2023-2024
- Robert Cantelmo, 2024-current

== See also ==
- History of Ithaca, New York
