= Watch Duty =

Real-time wildfire and flood tracking and alert platform

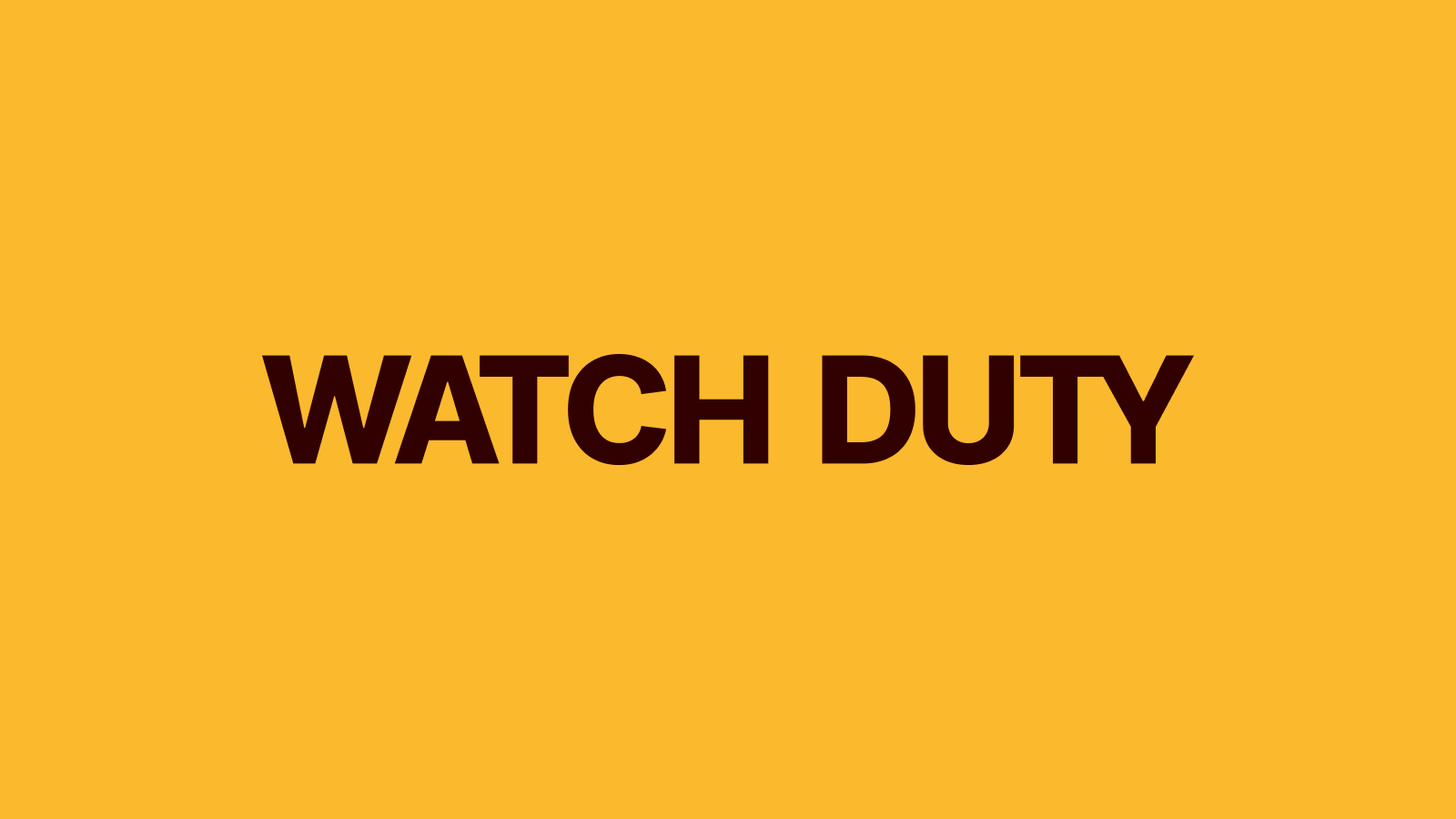
- Founded: 2021; 5 years ago
- Founders: John Mills; David Merritt
- Type: 501(c)(3) non-profit
- Location: Santa Rosa, California
- Services: Wildfire and Flood Tracking
- Website: www.watchduty.org

Watch Duty is real-time wildfire and flood tracking alert platform. It utilizes a combination of official data sources and human monitoring by experienced volunteers, including active and retired firefighters, dispatchers, and first responders. The service is operated by Sherwood Forestry Service, a 501(c)(3) non-profit organization. In 2025, Watch Duty had 48 full-time employees and approximately 250 volunteers who reported on over 13,000 wildfires. In June 2026, Watch Duty announced they now cover major flooding events.

== History ==
Watch Duty was launched in August 2021 by John Mills, who experienced a wildfire shortly after he moved to Sonoma County, California. The California Department of Forestry and Fire Protection (CAL FIRE) was unable to provide updates more than once a day due to time constraints, and residents of the area were unable to monitor the progression of the wildfire. Mills discovered that updates were being shared on social media by volunteers following radio scanners, and developed the Watch Duty app to make the information more readily available. It launched with a volunteer staff of "citizen information officers", initially serving Sonoma County before expanding to all of California in June 2022. As of December 2024, the service covered 22 states west of the Mississippi River. During the January 2025 Southern California wildfires, Watch Duty was downloaded millions of times, ranking among the most popular free downloads on the iOS App Store.

On December 1st, 2025, Watch Duty announced an expansion to all 50 U.S. states.

By June 2026, Flash Flood incidents, warnings, watches and emergencies were added to the app's alerts nationwide on top of wildfire incidents. This expansion included rain gauges, river gauges, and precipitation data as well as human reporting for catastrophic flooding incidents. A radar feature was available as well. The logo also changed to a yellow box with a black flame icon.

== App ==
The application is centered around an interactive map based on OpenStreetMap data with a variety of overlays visualizing fire risk, flood zones and warnings, river gauges, active fires and evacuation zones, weather conditions, and air quality observations. Watch Duty sources wildfire information from radio scanner transmissions, firefighters, sheriffs, and NOAA/NWS publications. It has policies against the publication of personally identifiable information, such as the names of fire victims. Watch Duty is free to use, doesn't require users to sign up, and doesn't display ads. Professional features such as critical infrastructure and models predicting future fire growth, do require the user to pay. These are designed for firefighters, first responders, and emergency managers.
