= Sherburne-Earlville Central School =

Sherburne-Earlville Central Schools

Location
- 15 School St. Sherburne, New York 13460; United States; 42.690558°N 75.49775°W

Information
- Type: Public
- School district: Sherburne-Earlville Central School District
- NCES District ID: 3626700
- Teaching staff: 120.45 (on an FTE basis)
- Grades: Pre-K-12
- Enrollment: 1,307 (2024-2025)
- Student to teacher ratio: 10.85
- Campus: Rural: distant
- Colors: Maroon and white
- Mascot: Wolf
- Yearbook: Archivon
- Website: www.secsd.org

Sherburne-Earlville Central School is the campus of the Sherburne-Earlville Central School District, a public school district located in Sherburne, Chenango County, New York, United States. The campus consists of two buildings. One building houses the elementary school, serving pre-kindergarten to fifth grade. The second building houses the middle school and high school. The middle school occupies the second floor of the building and includes grades six through eight. The high school is on the first floor.

== History ==
By the mid-1960s, the Sherburne Central School District was dealing with overcrowding and considering expansion. A merger with the neighboring Earlville Central School District had been discussed, but could not move forward while Earlville was under a state order to consolidate with the Hamilton school district.

In March 1967, voters approved the merger of the Sherburne and Earlville districts by more than a five-to-one margin. The new district took effect on 1 July 1967, and voters approved its first operating budget that June.

The district's athletic teams were formerly known as the Marauders. In 2024, the Board of Education adopted Timberwolves as the new nickname.

== Administration ==
Sherburne-Earlville Central School District is governed by an elected board of education. The district offices are located at 15 School Street in Sherburne.

== Sports ==
Sherburne-Earlville's athletic teams compete at the modified, junior varsity, and varsity levels and are known as the Timberwolves.

== Academics ==
Sherburne-Earlville High School offers Advanced Placement courses and college-credit opportunities through partner institutions, including Tompkins Cortland Community College, Morrisville State College, and Colgate University.

== The arts ==
Sherburne-Earlville offers art and music courses. The district also hosts the annual Sherburne Pageant of Bands.

== Odyssey of the Mind ==
Sherburne-Earlville students have participated in the Odyssey of the Mind problem-solving program. In 2003, Sherburne Earlville High School won first place in Division III for Problem 2, "The Know-It-All." In 2006, Sherburne Earlville High School placed fourth in Division III of Problem 1, "The Great Parade." In 2007, Sherburne-Earlville Middle School and Sherburne Earlville High School Team A competed at the World Finals at Michigan State University. The middle school team finished first in Division II and received a Ranatra Fusca Award, while the high school team finished third in Division III.

== Notable alumni ==
Notable alumni of Sherburne-Earlville include:

- Benjamin Busch — actor, writer, veteran of the United States Marine Corps, portrayed Anthony Colicchio on The Wire
- Randy Glasbergen — cartoonist
- Svante Myrick — Ithaca's first African-American mayor and youngest mayor
- Charlie Palmer — chef
- Andy Straka — Shamus Award-winning crime novelist
