= California Natural Resources Agency =

Department of the state government of California

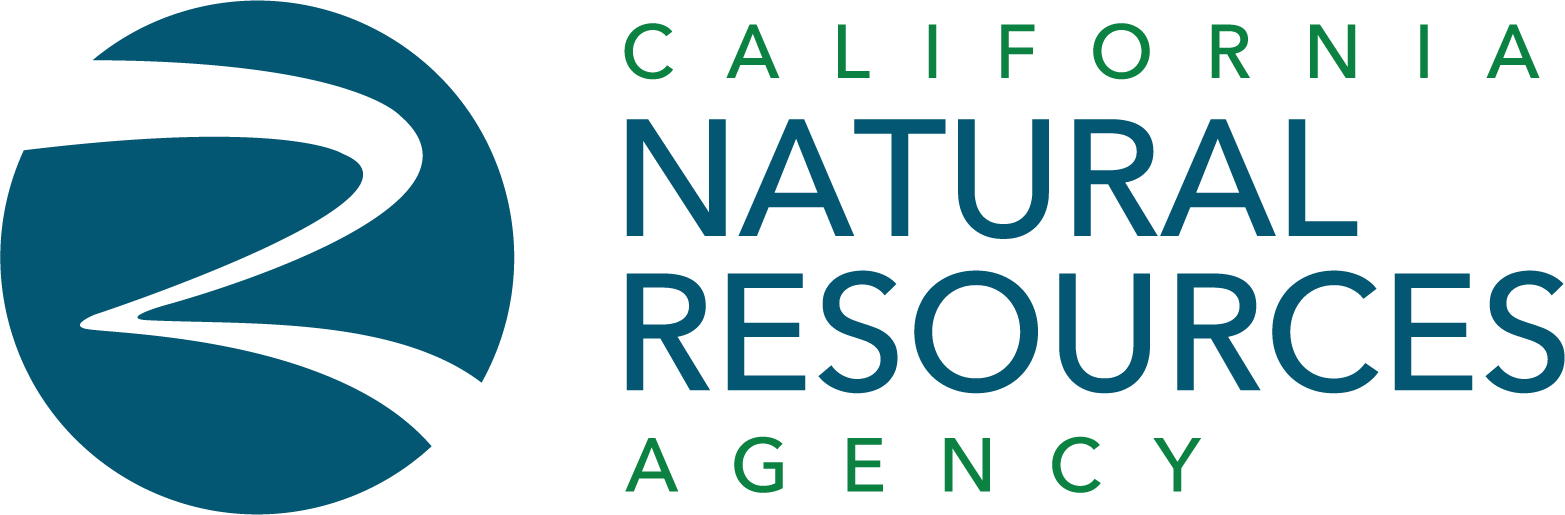
- Logo of the California Natural Resources Agency

Agency overview
- Headquarters: 715 P Street, 20th Floor Sacramento, California, U.S.
- Employees: 19,000 permanent staff
- Annual budget: US$ $8.767 billion (2017–2018)
- Agency executives: Wade Crowfoot, Secretary; Angela Barranco, Undersecretary
- Child agencies: California Conservation Corps; California Department of Conservation; California Department of Fish and Wildlife; California Department of Forestry and Fire Protection; California Department of Parks and Recreation; California Department of Water Resources
- Website: resources.ca.gov

The California Natural Resources Agency (CNRA) is a state cabinet-level agency in the government of California. The institution and jurisdiction of the Natural Resources Agency is provided for in California Government Code sections 12800 and 12805, et seq. The agency has six departments, 10 conservancies, 17 boards and commissions, three councils, and one urban park in Los Angeles that consists of two museums, the California Science Center and the California African American museum. Through its 25 departments, conservancies and commissions, the Natural Resources Agency is responsible for protecting prehistory history, natural landscapes and cultural sites, monitoring and stewarding state lands and waterways, and regulating fish and game use, as well as private lands and the intersection with federal lands and waters.

The current Secretary for Natural Resources is Wade Crowfoot, a member of Governor Gavin Newsom's cabinet.

== History ==
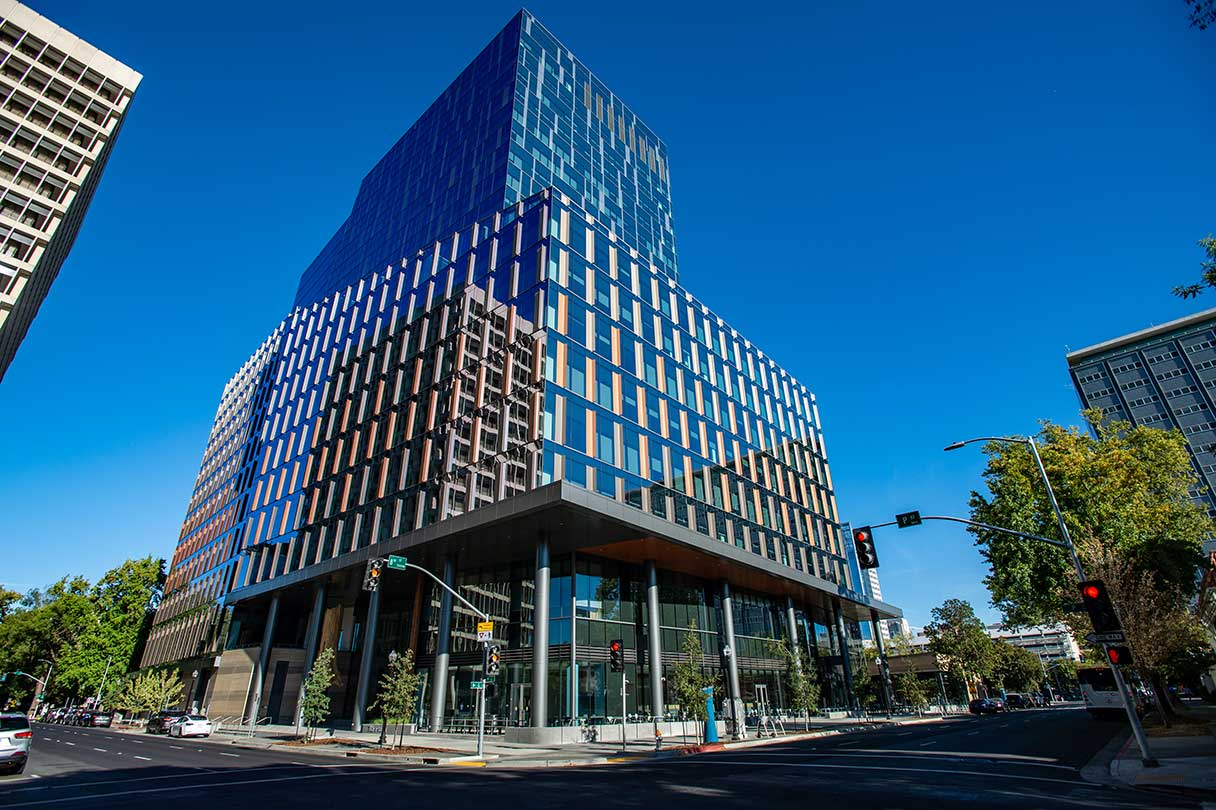
CNRA headquarters in Sacramento

In 1870, most of the state of California's natural resources were under federal jurisdiction, but as the state's population and needs grew, so did a desire for a closer-to-home approach to protecting the state's wildlands and wildlife. These sentiments led to the creation of the Board of Fish Commissioners in 1870 (the first wildlife conservation agency in the country), the Division of Forestry in 1881 (housed within the state's Department of Agriculture) and the Board of Forestry in 1885.

During this same period, federal and state leaders began to set aside land for preservation and public access. President Abraham Lincoln signed a federal law in 1864 that granted Yosemite Valley and Mariposa Big Tree Grove to create California's first state park. In 1901, both land grants were returned to the federal government. A year later in 1902, the state purchased 2,500 acres of redwood forests in the Santa Cruz Mountains to create Big Basin Redwoods State Park, California's longest-running state park.

=== 20th century ===
At the turn of the 20th century, California's emerged on the forefront of the preservation movement by expanding fish and game laws, establishing a state forester to regulate timber harvest, acquiring historical monuments, and passing the Water Commission Act in 1913 to establish the State Water Commission to oversee rights to use surface water.

In 1927, Governor Clement Calhoun Young restructured many of state boards, commissions, divisions, and departments to create the Department of Natural Resources. This new Department included the Division of Forestry, known today as CAL FIRE (created in 1977), and a Division of Beaches and Parks, known today as the Department of State Parks and Recreation (created in 1967).

In 1961, Governor Edmund G. “Pat” Brown reorganized the executive branch and established the Resources Agency to consolidate management of the state's diverse resources. The new agency oversaw the Department of Fish and Game (created in 1951), known today as the Department of Fish and Wildlife (renamed in 2012), Department of Water Resources (created in 1954), Department of Conservation (created in 1961). This restructure also placed most of the state's environmental quality programs within the Resources Agency. In 1991, those environmental quality programs, designed to limit environmental pollution, were placed under a new state agency, the California Environmental Protection Agency.

=== 21st century ===
In 2009, the Resources Agency adopted its current name of the California Natural Resources Agency to better reflect its primary mission of protecting the state's natural resources. Today, the California Natural Resources Agency stewards 100 million acres of California's land, hundreds of rivers and lakes, and more than 1,000 miles of coastline.

== Organization ==
=== Departments ===
The Natural Resources Agency is the parent department to a number of other departments:

- California Department of Conservation
- CALFED Bay-Delta Program
- California Department of Fish and Wildlife
- California Department of Forestry and Fire Protection
- California Department of Parks and Recreation
- California Department of Water Resources
- California Conservation Corps

=== Commissions ===
Also included within its jurisdiction are a number of study and regulatory commissions, boards and councils:

- California Coastal Commission
- California Energy Commission
- California State Lands Commission
- San Francisco Bay Conservation and Development Commission
- Delta Protection Commission
- Colorado River Board of California
- Central Valley Flood Protection Board
- Board of Forestry
- Fish and Game Commission
- Mining and Geology Board
- Native American Heritage Commission
- Parks and Recreation Commission
- State Historical Resources Commission
- State Off-Highway Motor Vehicle Recreation Commission
- California Water Commission
- California Boating and Waterways Commission
- Wildlife Conservation Board
- California Advisory Committee on Geographic Names

=== Conservancies ===
- Baldwin Hills Conservancy
- California Tahoe Conservancy
- Coachella Valley Mountains Conservancy
- Sacramento-San Joaquin Delta Conservancy
- San Diego River Conservancy
- San Gabriel and Lower Los Angeles Rivers and Mountains Conservancy
- San Joaquin River Conservancy
- Santa Monica Mountains Conservancy
- Sierra Nevada Conservancy
- State Coastal Conservancy

=== Museums ===
- California Science Center
- California African American Museum

== List of secretaries ==
William E. Warne, 1961–1962

Hugo Fisher, 1963–1965

Norman B. Livermore, 1967–1974

Claire T. Dedrick, 1975–1976

Huey D. Johnson, 1977–1982

Gordon K. Van Vleck, 1983–1990

Douglas P. Wheeler, 1991–1999

Mary D. Nichols, 1999–2003

Mike Chrisman, 2003–2010

Lester A. Snow, 2010

John Laird, 2011–2019

Wade Crowfoot, 2019–present
