= HGTV =

American pay television channel

- Country: United States
- Broadcast area: United States; International
- Headquarters: Knoxville, Tennessee

Programming
- Language: English
- Picture format: 1080i HDTV

Ownership
- Owner: Warner Bros. Discovery (2022–2026); Skydance Corporation (2026–present)
- Parent: Skydance Global Cable Media
- Sister channels: list of assets owned by Skydance

History
- Launched: December 30, 1994; 31 years ago
- Founder: Kenneth W. Lowe; Susan Packard

Links
- Website: www.hgtv.com

HGTV (an initialism for Home & Garden Television) is an American basic cable television channel owned by Skydance Corporation. The network primarily broadcasts reality programming related to home improvement and real estate. It was originally owned by the E. W. Scripps Company, which spun off its cable networks, including HGTV, into Scripps Networks Interactive. As of November 2023, HGTV was available to approximately 72,000,000 pay television households in the United States, down from its 2011 peak of 100,000,000 households.

== History ==
Kenneth W. Lowe (then a radio executive with the E. W. Scripps Company and later the chief executive officer of Scripps Networks Interactive) had the idea for HGTV in 1992. With financial support from the E.W. Scripps corporate board, he purchased CineTel, a small video production company in Knoxville, as the base and production hub of the new network. Lowe co-founded the channel with Susan Packard.

CineTel, which became Scripps Productions, was unable to produce more than thirty programs simultaneously, the organization hired former CBS television executive Ed Spray, who implemented a system of producing the channel's programming through independent production houses around the United States. Production of early series was overseen by Vice President of Programming Burton Jablin. About 90 percent of the channel's programming consisted of original productions at launch, with ten percent licensed and rerun from Canadian channels, PBS, and other sources.

Using local Scripps cable franchises (since divested), the Federal Communications Commission's "must-carry" provisions of Scripps medium-market television stations, and other small television operators to gain cable carriage, the channel launched on December 30, 1994. The channel focused on home building and remodeling, landscaping and gardening, decorating and design, and crafts and hobbies.

HGTV logo used from December 30, 1994, to February 28, 2010

During its development, the channel was originally named the Home, Lawn, and Garden Channel. The name was later shortened and a logo was developed. The network debuted with a small staff and gradually expanded its carriage among cable operators. At its peak in 2011, HGTV was available in approximately 100 million U.S. households.

In July 2008, the E.W. Scripps Company spun off the channel and the other Scripps cable channels and web-based properties into a separate company, Scripps Networks Interactive. E.W. Scripps broadcast television and newspaper properties remained as part of the original company.

In December 2011, the channel began broadcasting all of its programming in 16:9 aspect ratio format on its primary standard definition channel. This resulted in the appearance of black bars on the top and bottom of the screen on 4:3 aspect ratio televisions; HGTV's high-definition channel displayed the channel's programming in its native aspect ratio. On March 6, 2018, Discovery Communications completed its merger with Scripps Networks Interactive and assumed control of HGTV, Food Network and Travel Channel.

== Programming ==
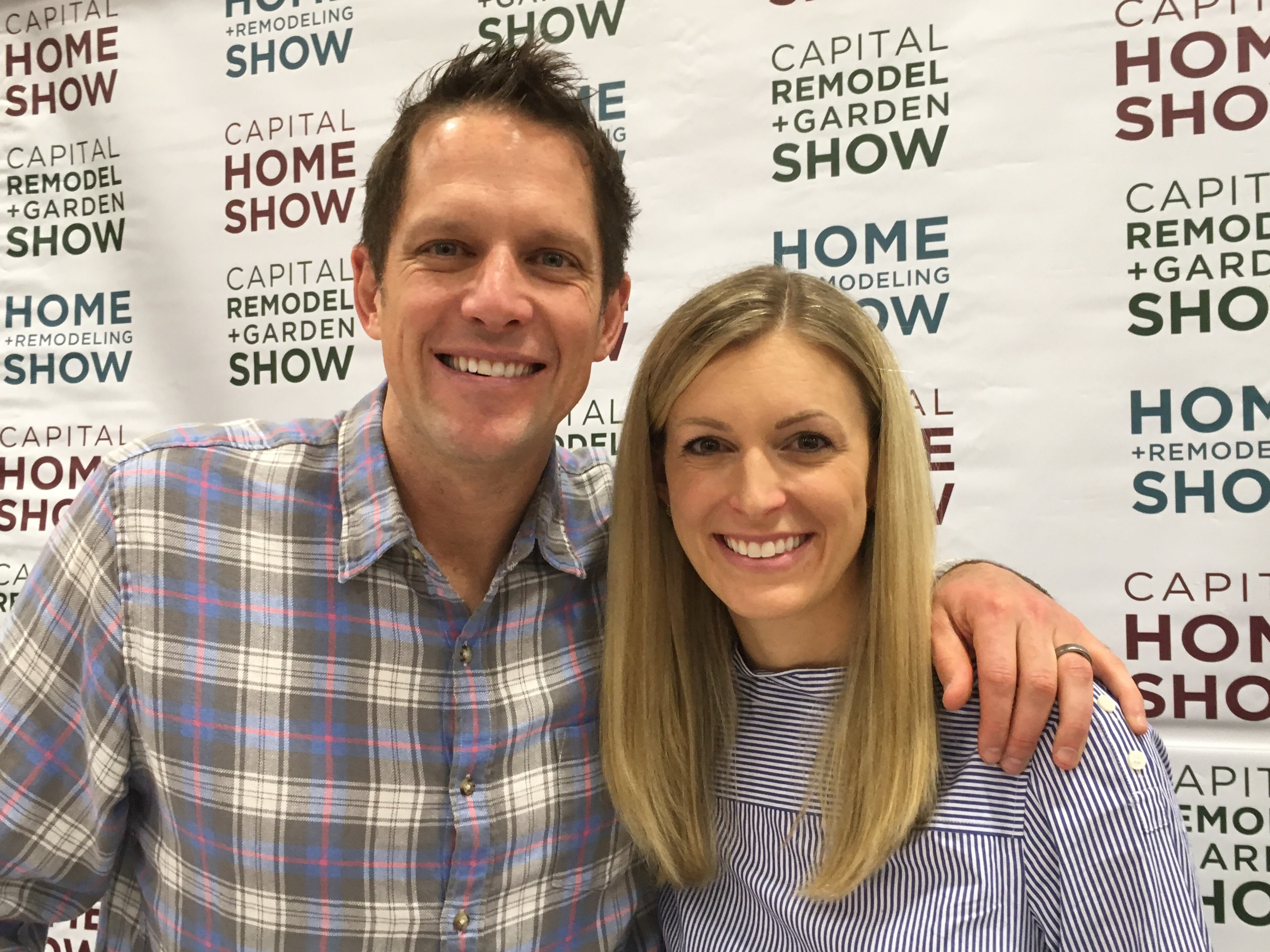
Chris Lambton and Peyton Lambton at the Capital Remodel and Garden Show at the Dulles Expo Center in 2018.

HGTV's programming focuses primarily on reality shows on home-buying, renovation and flipping. In 2016, the network reported annual programming expenditures of approximately $400 million.

A 2021 feature in The New Yorker characterized HGTV's programming as "cheering and conflict-free", describing it as offering viewers "recuperation, or respite".

The network conducts an annual sweepstakes, HGTV Dream Home, in which a custom-built home is awarded as the grand prize.

=== High definition ===
The 1080i high definition simulcast feed of HGTV launched on March 31, 2008. Originally, the HD channel did not simulcast the standard definition feed of HGTV. Instead, the HD channel featured programming separate from the standard channel. The standard definition feed of the channel began to carry the full 16:9 aspect ratio downgraded from the HD feed in a letterboxed format in early 2013.

== Carriage disputes ==
=== Cablevision ===
On December 31, 2009, Scripps Networks Interactive removed the Food Network and HGTV from New York City–area cable provider Cablevision, on the day that its carriage contract was set to expire. After months of negotiations, an agreement between Scripps and Cablevision was not reached, prompting the removal of the two channels. On January 21, 2010, Cablevision and Scripps reached a deal and the channels were restored to Cablevision's systems in the New York City area on the same day and by the next day in other areas.

=== AT&T U-verse ===
On November 5, 2010, AT&T U-verse pulled the DIY Network, Cooking Channel, Food Network, Great American Country and HGTV, due to a carriage dispute with Scripps Networks. The carriage dispute was resolved two days later, on November 7, 2010, through a new carriage agreement.

== Controversies and criticism ==
On June 13, 2012, representatives for HGTV admitted that scenes featured in the original series House Hunters are mostly recreations of prior events. In many cases, the final decision and purchase were made prior to filming. In some cases, homes visited were not even on the market.

In May 2014, HGTV canceled the premiere of the Benham Brothers' series Flip It Forward (which was created for the channel), due to a controversy regarding the brothers' beliefs concerning homosexuality and abortion.

In July 2023, The Washington Post covered a study that found that homeowners who watched HGTV and saw the "before" sequences, in which hosts are critical of the pre-renovation living space, felt "uneasy" about decorating decisions they make inside of their home. The study suggests this has led to a "shift toward standardization", in which homeowners choose neutral, inoffensive design choices.

== International ==
=== Canada ===
In 1997, Atlantis Communications and Scripps Networks launched a Canadian version of HGTV as a basic cable specialty channel. Through a series of acquisitions over the years, Corus Entertainment became Scripps Networks' partner in the network.

The Canadian version features much of the same programming as the American channel, as well as domestically produced programs, and some similar programming acquired from other broadcasters. Some of HGTV Canada's programs have aired on the American channel; with Love It or List It and Property Brothers becoming among HGTV's most popular programs in the United States. The two programs were originally produced for a local sister channel, W Network, but were later moved to HGTV Canada and other sister channels after W Network was retooled as a women's general entertainment channel.

In June 2024, WBD announced that it would end its licensing agreements with Corus and Bell Media for its lifestyle and factual networks beginning in 2025, and transfer Canadian rights to the brands to Rogers Communications. The existing channel was relaunched by Corus under the in-house brand Home Network effective December 30, 2024, while a new HGTV channel under Rogers ownership launched on January 1, 2025.

=== Singapore ===
In December 2014, HGTV Asia was first launched in Singapore via StarHub TV, but closed on August 31, 2018, along with other Discovery channels; the channel relaunched on October 1, 2023. It was launched on Singtel TV on September 28, 2018, on channel 250.

=== Australia ===
On February 1, 2015, HGTV launched in Australia on Australian IPTV service Fetch TV.

On February 14, 2017, the channel was made available in HD for Fetch TV customers.

Programming from the network also airs free-to-air on Nine Network's digital multichannel 9Life.

=== Malaysia ===
On August 31, 2015, HGTV launched in Malaysia on Astro.

On August 1, 2023, HGTV also launched in Malaysia via Unifi TV.

=== Netherlands and Belgium ===
On January 21, 2021, it was announced that HGTV would launch in the Netherlands through Ziggo during 2021, but the launch was eventually postponed indefinitely. The channel eventually launched on January 15, 2024, on KPN, Odido and Ziggo. In Belgium, HGTV launched on March 27, 2024, via Telenet.

==== Portugal ====
HGTV was launched in Portugal on MEO in June 2022, using the Dutch feed with Portuguese subtitles during programs. It was then added to Vodafone, and NOS on October 10, 2024.

=== New Zealand ===
On June 27, 2016, HGTV launched in New Zealand as a free-to-air channel on the Freeview terrestrial platform. The channel was started as a joint venture with the Canadian broadcaster Blue Ant Media, and was acquired by Discovery, Inc. in 2019. On August 24, 2016, HGTV launched on the Freeview satellite platform and on Sky. HGTV programming is available on-demand via ThreeNow.

In July 2025, HGTV was acquired by Sky, with the transaction occurring on August 1, 2025.

=== Indonesia ===
On July 1, 2016, HGTV launched in Indonesia on MNC Vision. HGTV also launched on First Media, Indihome UseeTV, MyRepublic and Matrix Garuda (same with Nex Parabola).

=== Italy ===
As of February 2, 2020, HGTV Italia is available through DTTV (free to air terrestrial digital television) on channel 56 and on satellite (Sky and Tivùsat). Most of the schedule is filled with programming from the American channel with Italian voice over.

=== Poland ===
Scripps Networks Interactive purchased a majority stake in TVN from ITI Group, acquiring the company's channels. On January 7, 2017, HGTV replaced fitness and weather channel TVN Meteo Active. HGTV is known in Poland as HGTV Home & Garden. This was the first market in Europe the channel was expanded to.

=== Philippines ===
On March 1, 2015, HGTV launched in the Philippines on Sky Cable, Destiny Cable, and Cignal.

=== Romania ===
On December 30, 2019, HGTV launched in Romania on RCS & RDS.

=== Taiwan ===
On May 29, 2016, HGTV launched in Taiwan via Kbro, Taipei Cable, TWT Cable, and New Taipei City Cable. On January 1, 2020, HGTV launched in CHT MOD.

=== Hong Kong ===
HGTV was launched on Hong Kong's Now TV and Now Player on September 1, 2021, on channel 529 to replace Fox Networks Group Asia Pacific's channels.

=== Myanmar (Burma) ===
HGTV launched on Sky Net Channel 67 on October 19, 2018, and also planned to launch in Myanmar on CANAL+ Channel 119.

=== Vietnam ===
HGTV was launched in Vietnam on November 20, 2018, available on VTVCab and Viettel TV.

=== Latin America ===
HGTV was launched in Latin America by Discovery Inc. in March 2019.

=== United Kingdom and Ireland ===
In June 2019, it was announced that former UKTV channel Home, which Discovery had acquired full control of earlier in the year, would be replaced as a UK version of HGTV on January 21, 2020. The UK channel closed in January 2026.

=== Germany ===
On June 6, 2019, HGTV launched in Germany on Astra 19.2°E and Cable TV free to air.

=== Middle East and North Africa ===
In Middle East and North Africa region, HGTV is available on beIN Media channel 260 and is one of their lifestyle channels.

=== South Africa ===
On July 15, 2019, Discovery launched the South African version of HGTV on the DStv satellite platform on Channel 177, as well as on the DStv Now streaming platform.

=== Bulgaria ===
HGTV launched in Bulgaria after Fine Living closed in January 2020.

=== France ===
A French version of HGTV was planned to launch on Canal+ in November 2020, and the website was created, but the channel was canceled.

== Hogar de HGTV ==
Hogar de HGTV

Programming
- Picture format: 1080i HDTV

Ownership
- Owner: Skydance
- Parent: Skydance Global Cable Media
- Sister channels: CNN en Español; Cinemáx; Discovery en Español; Discovery Familia; HBO Latino; MTV Tres

History
- Launched: June 30, 2020; 6 years ago

Links
- Website: www.hogarhgtv.com

Availability

Streaming media
- Service(s): DirecTV Stream, Hulu + Live TV, Vidgo, YouTube TV
- HBO Max/Discovery+

Hogar de HGTV is a Spanish-language spin-off of HGTV in the United States, launched on June 30, 2020. It features Spanish-dubbed programming from HGTV and related networks, along with some original Spanish-language content.

== Awards ==
HGTV received the Academy of Achievement Award at the 22nd Annual Accessories Resource Team (ARTS) gala event on January 2, 2011. In 2012, HGTV won the Dixon Award for Best TV Channel.

== See also ==
- List of United States pay television channels
