= California Conservation Corps =

Voluntary work development program in California

- CCC; Conservation Corps
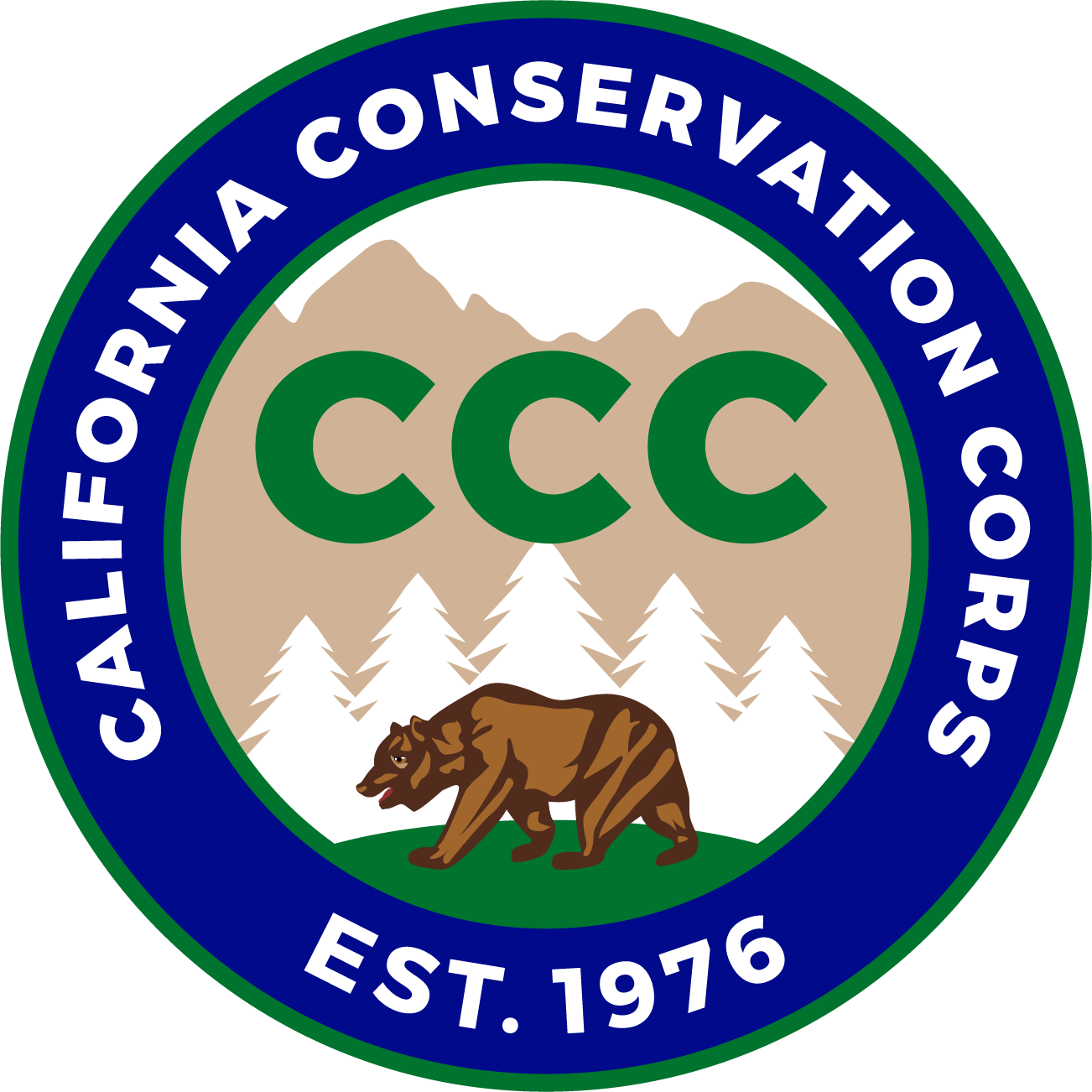

Agency overview
- Formed: July 7, 1976
- Headquarters: 1719 24th Street, Sacramento, California
- Employees: 1,500 - 2,000
- Annual budget: $90.7 million (2016)
- Agency executive: Jared Patton, Director
- Parent agency: California Resources Agency
- Website: http://www.ccc.ca.gov/

The California Conservation Corps (CCC) is a department of the government of California falling under the state cabinet-level California Resources Agency. The CCC is a voluntary work development program specifically for men and women between the ages of 18 and 25 (up to 29 for veterans), offering work in environmental conservation, fire protection, land maintenance, and emergency response to natural disasters. Members of the CCC are referred to as "Corpsmembers", and are paid a monthly stipend; as of November 2025, the amount was $2,810.

== History ==
The bill to create the California Conservation Corps was co-authored by California State senator Ruben Ayala. The legislation was signed into law by Governor Jerry Brown on July 7, 1976, modeling the corps after the federal Civilian Conservation Corps that started with Franklin D. Roosevelt and the New Deal in the 1930s. Brown envisioned a department marketed specifically to the state's young people as "a combination Jesuit seminary, Israeli kibbutz, and Marine Corps boot camp". Prominent amongst the early CCC administrators was war hero B. T. Collins. The CCC replaced the California Ecology Corps that was created by executive order of Governor Ronald Reagan in 1971 as an "alternative service" option for Conscientious Objectors during the Vietnam War.

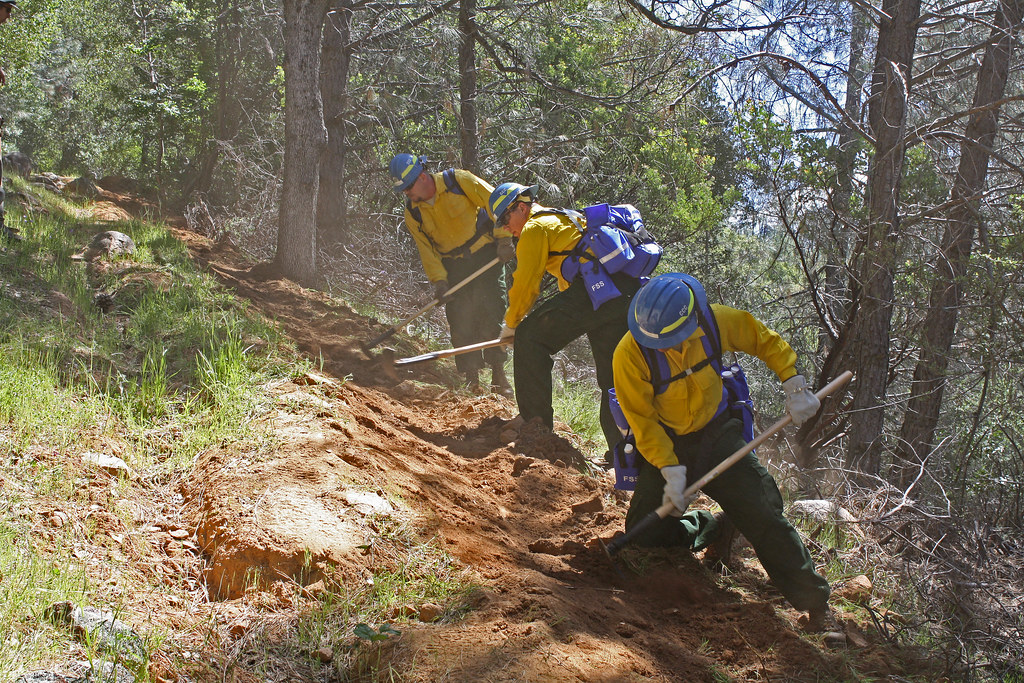
Conservation Corpsmembers cutting fire control line

Following the end of his governorship, Brown's successor, Governor George Deukmejian, signed legislation to eliminate the CCC's sunset clause by making it a permanent department under the California Resources Agency in 1983.

The duties of operation falling to the CCC include trail maintenance, riparian zone restoration, tree planting and exotic plant species removal, construction, and emergency flood and wildfire response. Other organizations pay the CCC to do the work. Corpsmembers are offered the chance to complete their high school diploma through independent CCC schools and are trained in cooking, office work, chainsaw, and vehicle maintenance. The CCC also encourages corpsmembers to seek higher education or vocational training by offering scholarships.

Corpsmembers in some centers across the state participate in CAB (Corpsmember Advisory Board), an employee/ resident board established to be the middle ground. The board is responsible for community check ups and upholding a strong morale among the center's population, as well as bringing up pressing concerns the community faces on a weekly basis.

Corpsmembers have four distinct colors they wear as a part of their uniforms to distinct their rank and role in each crew. "Blue hats" are the most common Corpsmember, displayed by the blue baseball caps and hardhats they wear. "Green hats" are Corpsmembers who've displayed a level of interest and specialty in one desired trade within the Corps (Ex. Tools specialist, Forestry specialist, Trail specialist, etc.). "Red hats" are those who've shown to their direct supervisor, the Conservationist 1, that they are reliable enough to expand the chain of command from supervisor to corpsmember. "Orange hats" is a red hat whose excelled in their supervisional duties and can act as a Conservationist 1 if required and can take responsibility over their subordinates.

Since 1992, the California Department of Finance has allotted less funding to the CCC, forcing the closure of numerous residential centers throughout the state.

The CCC has received presidential praise as well as numerous awards for its work.

== Related organizations ==
There are Fourteen local conservation corps groups in California that are certified annually by the CCC to offer similar job training, education, and environmental projects in other areas of California.

- Cesar Chavez Environmental Corps – Tehachapi, CA
- Civicorps – Oakland, CA
- Conservation Corps North Bay – San Rafael, CA
- Conservation Corps of Long Beach – Long Beach, CA
- Fresno Local Conservation Corps – Fresno, CA
- Greater Valley Conservation Corps – Stockton, CA
- Los Angeles Conservation Corps – Los Angeles, CA
- Orange County Conservation Corps – Anaheim, CA
- Sacramento Regional Conservation Corps – Sacramento, CA
- San Francisco Conservation Corps – San Francisco, CA
- San Jose Conservation Corps – San Jose, CA
- Sequoia Community Corps – Visalia, CA
- Urban Conservation Corps of the Inland Empire – San Bernardino, CA
- Urban Corps of San Diego County – San Diego, CA

=== Urban Corps of San Diego ===
The San Diego local corps was founded in 1989 with help from former Representative Lynn Schenk and then-Mayor Maureen O'Connor, with an initial budget of $125,000. They engage in a variety of community service and conservation projects, including stadium cleanup, trash pickup and graffiti removal. There are about 200 Corpsmembers employed at any given time.

== See also ==
- California Department of Forestry and Fire Protection
