= California Department of Conservation =

Department within the government of California state, US

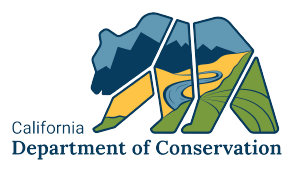

Agency overview
- Headquarters: 715 P Street, MS 1900, Sacramento, California
- Annual budget: $1 billion (2007)
- Agency executives: Jennifer Lucchesi, Director; Gabe Tiffany, Chief Deputy Director
- Parent agency: California Natural Resources Agency
- Website: www.conservation.ca.gov

The California Department of Conservation is a department within the government of California, belonging to the California Natural Resources Agency. With a team of scientists, engineers, environmental experts, and other specialists, the Department of Conservation administers a variety of programs vital to California's public safety, environment and economy. The department's mission is to manage California's working lands. It regulates oil, natural gas and geothermal wells; studies and maps earthquakes and other geologic phenomena; maps and classifies areas containing mineral deposits; ensures reclamation of land used for mining; and administers agricultural and open-space land conservation programs. A division within the department dedicated to encouraging beverage container recycling has been moved into the newly created Department of Resources Recovery and Recycling (CalRecycle). Despite the similar name, the Department of Conservation should not be confused with the California Conservation Corps, another department within the Natural Resources Agency, which provides work experience for young adults. The Department of Conservation often collaborates with its federal equivalents, such as the U.S. Geological Survey.

The department's director is Jennifer Lucchesi.

== Divisions ==
The Department of Conservation is divided into five divisions to oversee its various responsibilities.

=== California Geological Survey (CGS) ===
The California Geological Survey provides scientific analysis of the state's geology, seismic hazards, and mineral resources. Historically, CGS began as a short-lived California Geological Survey (1860–1874). In 1880, the California Legislature created the State Mining Bureau, which focused solely on mining and mineral resources and reported directly to the Governor. The Bureau gradually added authority to regulate oil and gas development, as well as forestry (timber to support mining was a major issue of the day). In 1927, as California Government grew, the Bureau became the Division of Mines within the State's Department of Natural Resources. About the same time, responsibilities for forests were given to a new Division of Forestry, and oil and gas to a new Division of Oil and Gas, both in the Department of Natural resources.

Although mining remained the focus of the Division of Mines, emphasis began to grow in basic geologic products through the 1940s and 1950s. In 1961, the name was changed to Division of Mines and Geology (DMG), with a greater emphasis on environmental geology in urban areas. Following the 1971 San Fernando earthquake, DMG was authorized to delineate regulatory zones along faults and install instruments to record earthquake strong motion. In 1976, it was authorized to help assure reclamation of mined lands, and in 1990 to delineate regulatory zones for liquefaction, earthquake-triggered landslides, and tsunamis. In January 1991, reclamation-related responsibilities were moved to a new Office of Mine Reclamation. In 2002, the Division unofficially began using the name California Geological Survey, a change that was formally authorized in 2006 by the California Legislature.

=== Division of Land Resource Protection (DLRP) ===
Promoting conservation, the Division of Resource Protection oversees studies regarding urban sprawl, the use of farmland, and regularly monitors and maps the loss of farmland to urban growth.

A policy that falls under the Division of Land Resource Protection is the California Land Conservation Act of 1965, or the Williamson Act. The Williamson Act is a California law that gives property tax priority to landowners who keep their land an open or agricultural space. While the act’s language has changed over the years, it was created in an effort to prevent the urban development of agricultural land in California and to make agricultural work an economically sound career for farmers. While counties that opt-in are required to facilitate their own structure for implementing the Williamson Act, the California Department of Conservation is responsible for aiding the interpretation of the act on a broader level. This means making the act accessible to the public, from government agencies to landowners. For example, the department is mandated to post information regarding the act on its website, including but not limited to how many acres are in use under the act, where to find certificates of cancellation, and the amount of cancellation fees for a given county.

Another policy that falls under the Division of Land Resource Protection is the California Environmental Quality Act or CEQA. This act was created in 1970 to ensure the government and its agencies maintain a healthy and aesthetically pleasing environment for Californians, while also recognizing that action must be taken now to keep it that way. Some of CEQA’s responsibilities for governmental agencies include spreading awareness of the environmental impacts certain activities create, researching how damage to the environment can be mitigated for better alternatives, and making environment-based governmental decisions and their reasonings available for transparency. It’s the responsibility of the Division of Land Resource Protection to aid in the education of CEQA processes to the public. This includes reviewing environmental decisions, making public comments, and technical support for everyone from governmental agencies to members of the public. An example of this is providing information about CEQA on the California Department of Conservation’s website.

=== Division of Mine Reclamation (DMR) ===
The Surface Mining and Reclamation Act of 1975 (SMARA) gave the Department of Conservation responsibilities related to reclamation of mined lands. Initially these responsibilities were allocated to the Division of Mines and Geology, working in concert with the State Mining and Geology Board and local governments. In 1991, those responsibilities were transferred to the Division of Mine Reclamation. DMR is involved in every mining operation within the state, studying the ability of mining operations to restore land to its previously unaltered state following the cessation of mine operations.

=== Geologic Energy Management Division (CalGEM, formerly DOGGR) ===
The California Geologic Energy Management Division (CalGEM) prioritizes protecting public health, safety, and the environment in its oversight of the oil, natural gas, and geothermal industries, while working to help California achieve its climate change and clean energy goals. To do that, CalGEM uses science and sound engineering practices to regulate the drilling, operation, and permanent closure of energy resource wells.

CalGEM also maintains a database of active wells, expired wells, surveyed lands and leases on California land, coastal waters (0–3 miles) and federal Outer Continental Shelf (OCS). When a well is no longer needed, either because the oil or gas reservoir becomes depleted, or because no oil or gas was found (called a dry-hole), the well is plugged and abandoned. A well is plugged by placing cement in the well-bore or casing at certain intervals as specified in California laws or regulations. The purpose of the cement is to seal the wellbore or casing and prevent fluid from migrating between underground rock layers. Cement plugs are required to be placed across the oil or gas reservoir (zone plug), across the base-of-fresh-water (BFW plug), and at the surface (surface plug). Other cement plugs may be required at the bottom of a string of open casing (shoe plug), on top of tools that may become stuck down hole (junk plug), on top of cut casing (stub plug), or anywhere else where a cement plug may be needed. Also, the hole is filled with drilling mud to help prevent the migration of fluids.

In 2014 the Division of Oil, Gas, and Geothermal Resources (DOGGR) officials admitted that for several years they had "inadvertently" permitted companies to inject potentially hazardous wastewater from fracking and other oil production operations "into hundreds of disposal wells in protected aquifers" in violation of federal law. The oversight was attributed to "haphazard record-keeping and antiquated data collection."

In 2019, Governor Gavin Newsom fired director Ken Harris over allegations of conflict of interest.

On 1 January 2020 DOGGR's name was changed to the California Geologic Energy Management Division (CalGEM).)

=== State Mining and Geology Board ===
The State Mining and Geology Board is granted certain autonomous responsibilities and obligations under several statutes within the Department of Conservation. The board's general authority requires its nine board members to "represent the general public interest." The board serves as a regulatory, policy and appeals body representing the state's interest in geology, geologic and seismologic hazards, conservation of mineral resources, and reclamation following surface mining activities.

== See also ==
- California Environmental Protection Agency
- United States Geological Survey
