= State Historical Resources Commission =

Agency overview
- Formed: 1974
- Jurisdiction: Government of California
- Headquarters: 1725 23rd Street, Sacramento, California
- Agency executive: Chairperson
- Parent department: California Department of Parks and Recreation
- Parent agency: Office of Historic Preservation
- Key document: California Public Resources Code §5020

The State Historical Resources Commission (SHRC) is a California state commission responsible for identifying, registering, and preserving historical resources throughout the state. It traces its roots back to the 1850 founding of the Society of California Pioneers which existed to preserve records of early California. Originally established as the ‘’‘Historical Landmarks Advisory Committee’’’ in 1949, SHRC was reorganized into its current form in 1974 under California Public Resources Code §5020.

== Responsibilities ==
The SHRC reviews and recommends nominations of historical resources to the National Register of Historic Places, the California Register of Historical Resources, and designates California Historical Landmarks and California Points of Historical Interest. The Commission advises the California Office of Historic Preservation on preservation policy, maintains inventories of historical resources, and develops guidelines for identifying and rehabilitating historic properties.

== Membership ==
The SHRC comprises nine members appointed by the Governor of California to four-year terms. Five members must be professionals qualified in history, archaeology (prehistoric and historic), architectural history, or architecture. Additionally, one member must be knowledgeable in ethnic history, another in folklife, and two members represent the general public.

== Notable actions and impacts ==
SHRC’s decisions significantly influence preservation policy and local planning. In 2022, the Commission recommended listing San Francisco’s St. Francis Wood Historic District on the National Register, which had implications for housing development policy in the area.

The Commission also recognized Santa Anita Park racetrack’s historical significance related to World War II Japanese American internment and successfully advocated for the expanded historical boundary of the Salk Institute for Biological Studies in La Jolla.

== Meetings and transparency ==
The Commission meets at least four times per year, rotating meeting locations throughout California to facilitate public participation. Meetings are conducted under the Bagley-Keene Open Meeting Act, ensuring transparency and public engagement.

== Relationship to other agencies ==
SHRC collaborates closely with the California Office of Historic Preservation and the National Park Service. It coordinates its actions with local governments through programs like the Certified Local Government initiative, ensuring consistent historic preservation practices statewide.

== Headquarters and administration ==
The Commission is headquartered within the Office of Historic Preservation in Sacramento, California, which provides administrative support, research, and staff assistance. Commissioners serve voluntarily, receiving nominal compensation as dictated by state law.

== See also ==
• California Register of Historical Resources • California Historical Landmark • National Register of Historic Places
