= DC-10 Air Tanker =

Aerial firefighting unit in the US

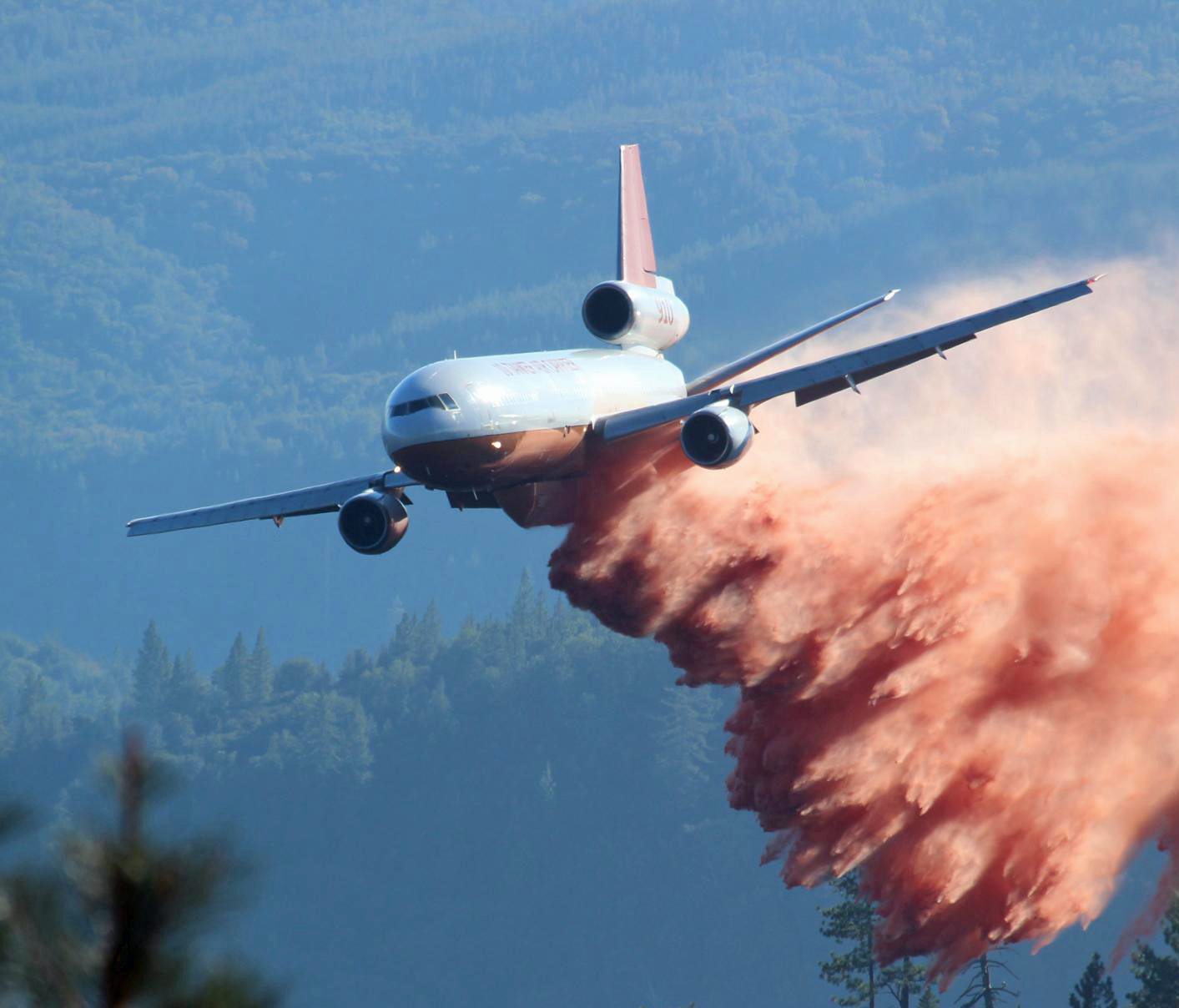
- Tanker 910 fighting the Rim Fire, August 2013

General information
- Type: Firefighting aircraft
- Manufacturer: McDonnell Douglas (conversion by 10 Tanker STC)
- Status: 4 in service
- Primary user: 10 Tanker Air Carrier
- Number built: 5 converted from former airliners

History
- Introduction date: 2006
- First flight: 2006
- Retired: 1 retired (original 910)
- Developed from: McDonnell Douglas DC-10

The DC-10 Air Tanker is a series of five air tankers converted by American joint technical venture 10 Tanker Air Carrier, which have been in service as aerial firefighting aircraft since 2006. The aircraft are converted McDonnell Douglas DC-10-30s used to fight wildfires. The turbofan-powered aircraft carries up to 9,400 US gallons (35,583 liters) of water or fire retardant in an exterior belly-mounted tank, the contents of which can be released in eight seconds. Four air tankers are currently in operation, all DC-10-30 aircraft, with the call-signs Tanker 910, 911, 912 and 914. The original Tanker 910, a DC-10-10, was retired in 2014.

== Development ==
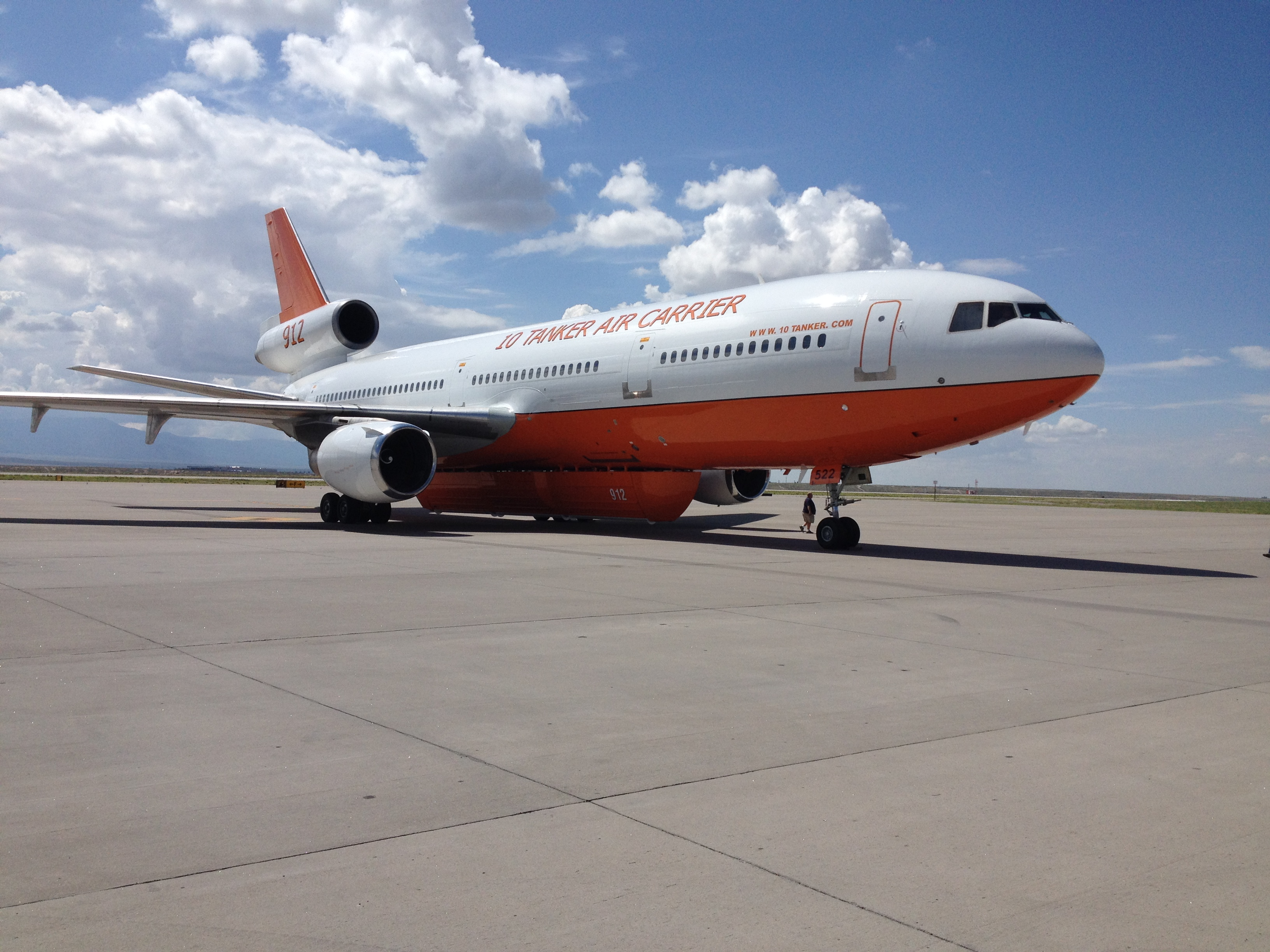
Tanker 912 taxiing in Albuquerque, New Mexico

10 Tanker Air Carrier, a New Mexico-based company, began researching the development of Next Generation airtankers in 2002. Company personnel were assembled with an extensive history of heavy jet operations, modifications and ownership. After two years of research into aerial firefighting requirements and future direction, 10 Tanker selected the DC-10 type for development. A Supplemental Type Certificate (STC) from the US Federal Aviation Administration (FAA) for modifications of DC-10 aircraft to be used for the aerial dispersant of liquids was issued in March 2006. 10 Tanker then obtained a 14 CFR Part 137 Operating Certificate for aerial firefighting and Interagency Airtanker Board (IAB) approval for agency use.

The first converted aircraft, a McDonnell Douglas DC-10-10 registered as N450AX, was originally delivered as a civil passenger plane to National Airlines in 1975, and subsequently flew for Pan Am (as N69NA), American Airlines, Hawaiian Airlines (as N161AA) and Omni Air International.

The conversion of the original airframe to a fire-fighting aircraft was a joint venture under the name of 10 Tanker Air Carrier between Cargo Conversions of San Carlos, California and Omni, with conversion work being performed by Victorville Aerospace at the Southern California Logistics Airport in Victorville, California.

== Design ==
The air tanker modification can be carried out to either a DC-10-10 or DC-10-30 series and involves the addition of an external tank and associated systems and support structure.

The water or retardant is carried in three center-line belly tanks. The tanks have internal baffles to prevent fluid shift (and consequent shift in center of gravity) while in flight, and sit with a 15-inch (38 cm) ground clearance. All three tanks can be filled simultaneously on the ground in eight minutes. The retardant is gravity-fed out of the tanks, and the entire load can be dumped in eight seconds, although the actual drop rate is computer controlled by the flight crew in order to produce the desired retardant spread over the fire lines. The aircraft is capable of applying a line of retardant 300 feet (91 m) wide by 1 mile (1.6 km) long.

The external retardant tanks are designed to be filled from standard 3-inch (76 mm) cam-lock couplings. Utilizing one, two or three hoses, the tanks can be filled as quickly as base loading capabilities permit, typically 15–20 minutes. The tanks are vented to atmosphere by a vent system installed on top of each tank to allow sufficient air into and out of the tanks during retardant drops and filling. Accurate quantity gauges are part of the installation.

The number of drops it can make in a day is only limited by the time it takes to reload the aircraft with water/fire retardant and fuel, as well as its need for a proper landing field, which may well be a considerable distance from the fire.

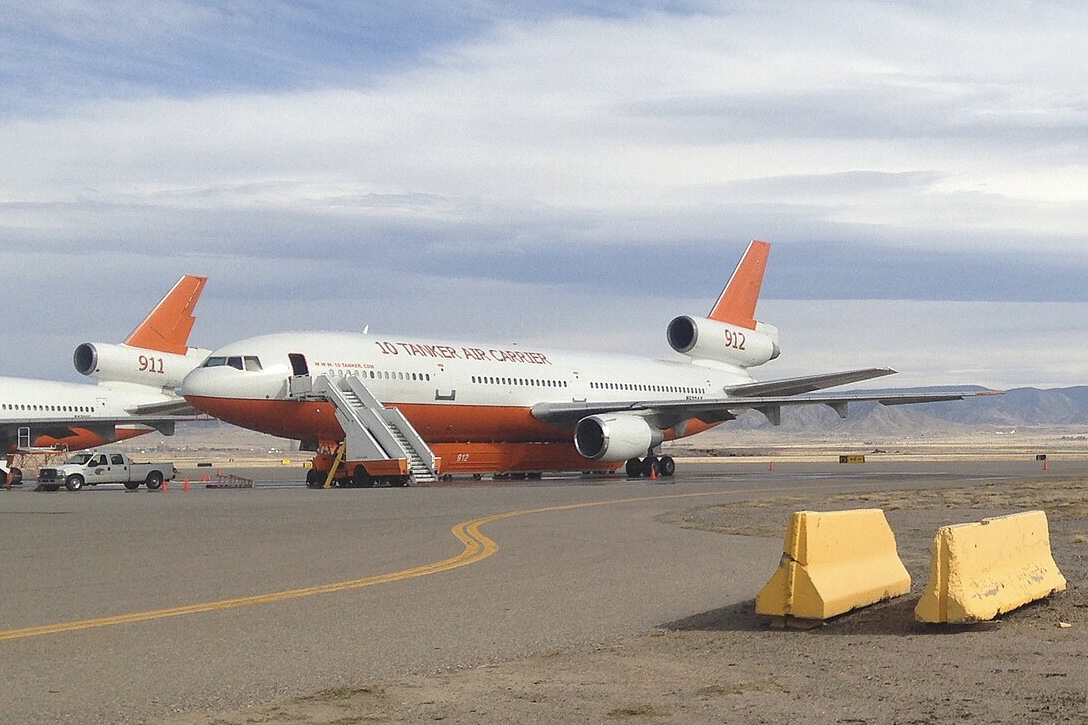
Tanker 912 next to Tanker 911 in February 2015

Skeptics have argued that the DC-10s lack maneuverability. However, despite its size, field experience has proven the plane’s agility above all types of terrain and in all atmospheric conditions deemed suitable for fixed wing operations in a Fire Traffic Area (FTA).

Unlike most existing and proposed Large Air Tankers (LATs), the DC-10 arrives at a Fire Traffic Area weighing significantly less than its certified maximum gross takeoff weight (MGTOW). This is principally due to the reduced fuel load carried on fire missions.

As a result:

- The 10 is frequently dispatched at a takeoff weight 40% lighter than its certified MGTOW.
- The 10 turns comfortably within the turn radius of smaller aircraft including Single Engine Air Tankers (SEAT) and lead planes.
- The 10’s improved thrust to weight ratio significantly increases rate of climb, and greatly enhances safety margins in a failed engine scenario.
- The 10 enjoys a wide margin above stall at typical drop speeds and weights, even with a full retardant load.

One drop from the aircraft is equivalent to 12 drops from a Grumman S-2 Tracker. Initially, the aircraft was intended to be operated primarily in California, and the entire state was serviced from the plane's Victorville base at the Southern California Logistics Airport, but in 2007 Cal Fire began looking into setting up a second operations base at Sacramento McClellan Airport in Northern California. 10 Tanker Air Carrier announced in 2007 that a second aircraft would be converted to tanker usage for the 2008 fire season.

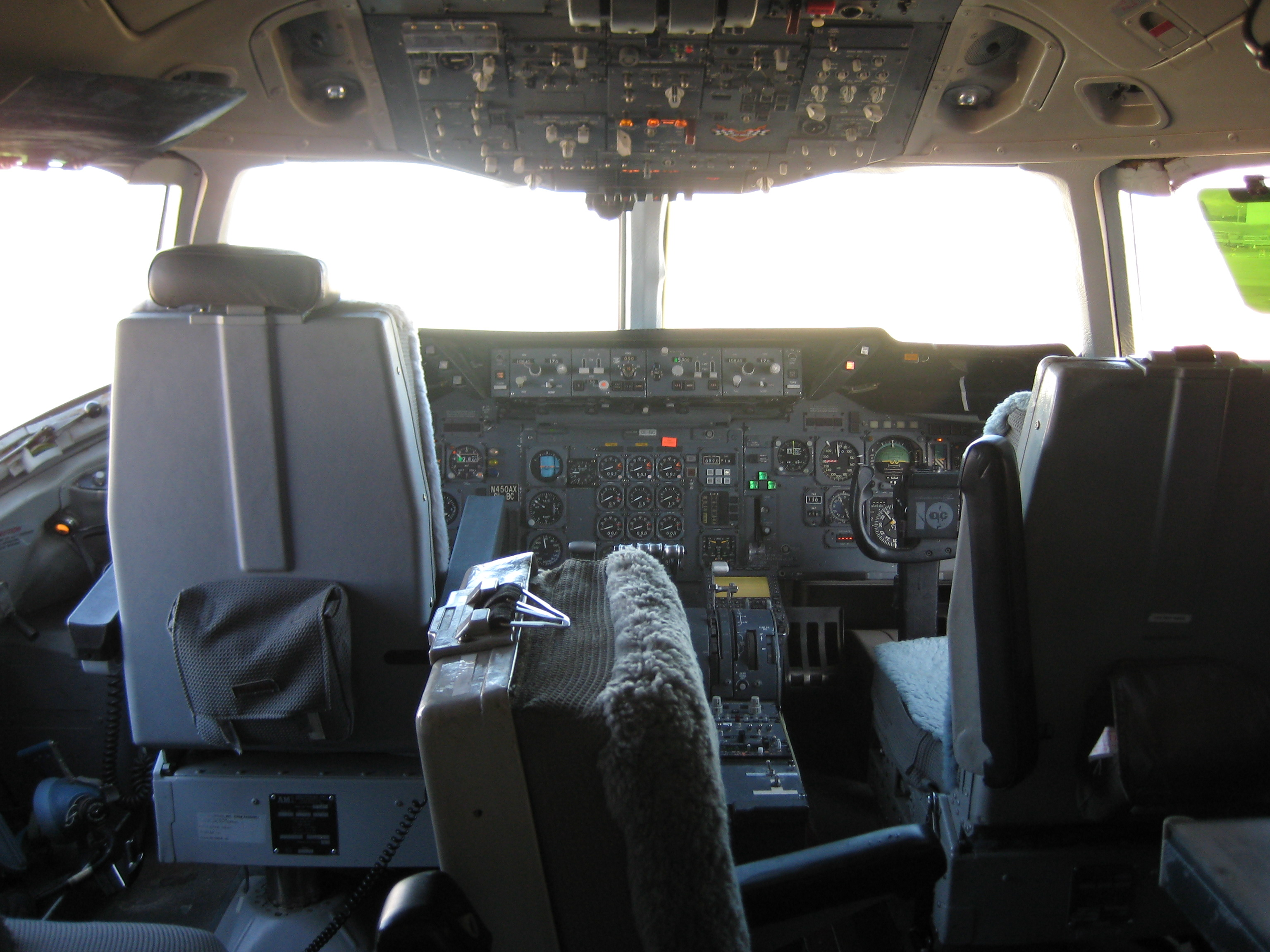
Inside view of Tanker 910's cockpit

== Operational history ==
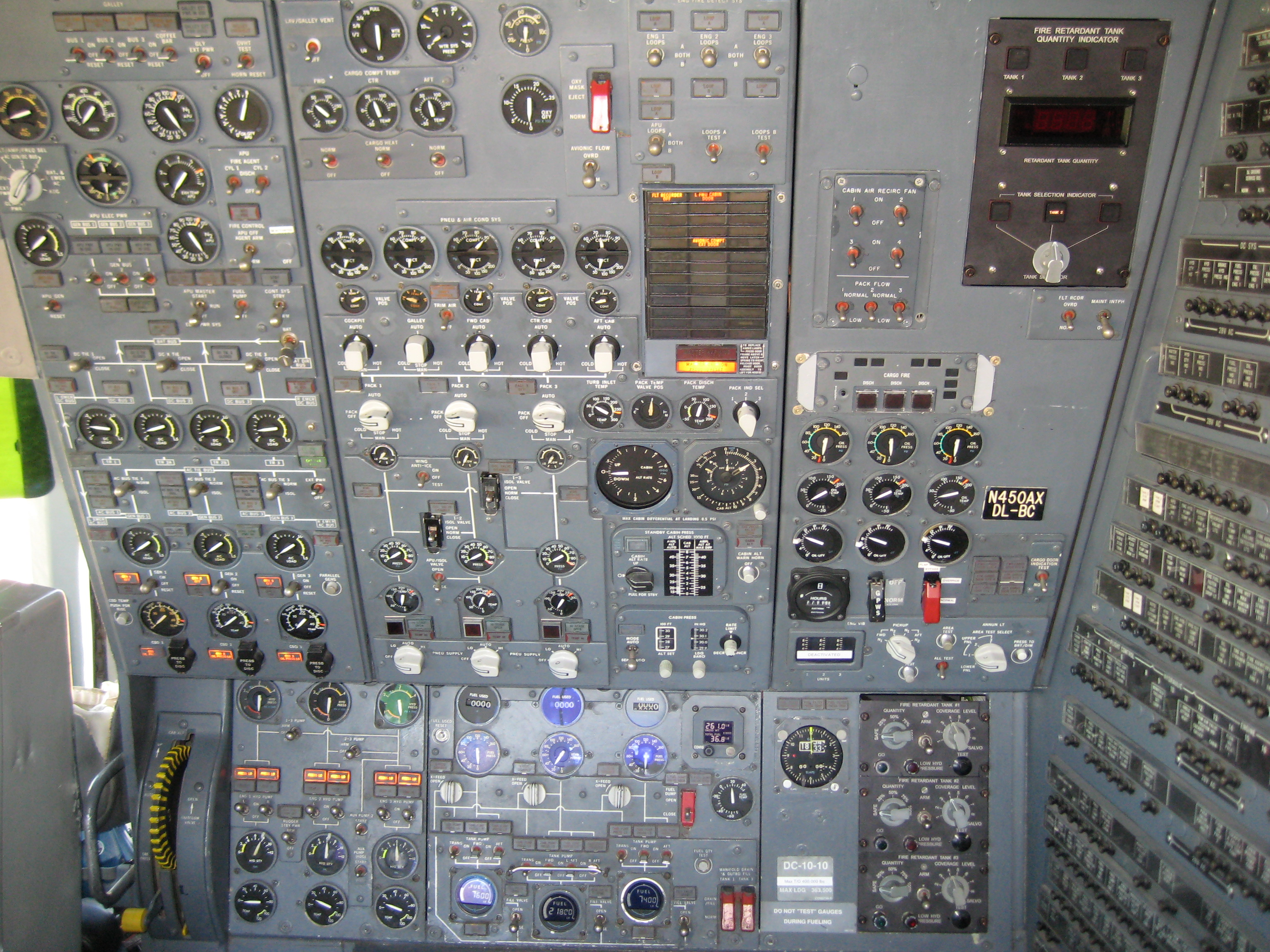
Flight engineer station

The DC-10s operate with a flight crew of three, a pilot, co-pilot and a flight engineer. The tanker works with a lead plane and can be an effective tool in combating wildfires when working directly with ground resources. 10 Tanker Air Carrier added a second DC-10 (N17085), formerly flown by Continental Airlines, to its fleet in July 2008, to be used on an on-call basis. In late 2014, the company added two additional DC-10s which had previously served with Omni and Northwest Airlines, N612AX and N522AX, which were numbered as Tankers 910 and 912 respectively. The original aircraft, N450AX, was subsequently withdrawn from use in November 2014.

=== Fire usage ===
Accepted for use as an air tanker by the US Forest Service (USFS) in 2006, and flying under state and international contracts ever since, the DC-10s were first employed directly by USFS in 2011.

In 2006, the aircraft was operated on a limited evaluation contract with the State of California. During the 2006 season, the aircraft was offered on a "call-when-needed" basis, which came with a US$26,500 per-flight-hour (three hour minimum) cost and a 12- to 24-hour activation delay. Under these terms, Tanker 910 flew on six fires in California and one in Washington.

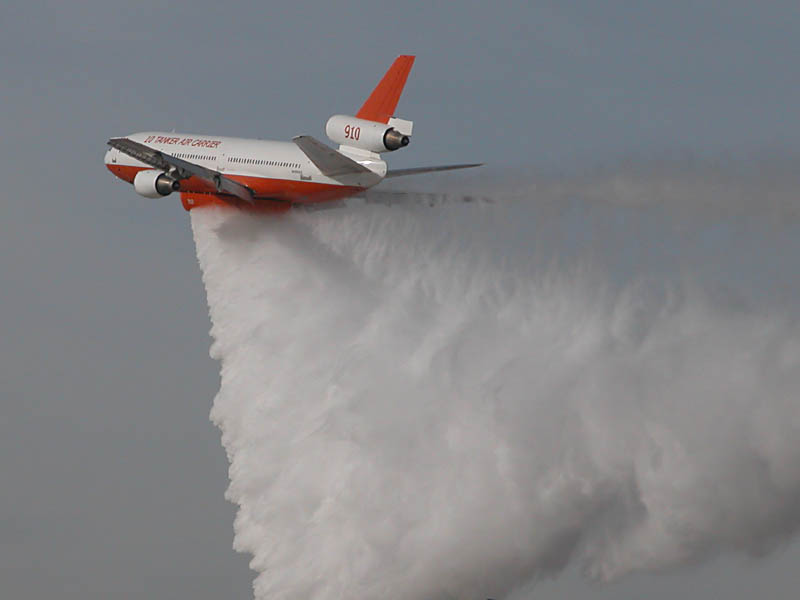
Tanker 910 during a drop demonstration in December 2006.

For the 2007–2009 fire seasons, California Governor Arnold Schwarzenegger authorized a contract for exclusive use of the aircraft at a cost of US$5 million per year, or an average of about US$41,000 per day for the June 15 to October 15 fire season; there was an additional US$5,500 per-flight-hour charge. The exclusivity of the contract allowed the aircraft to always be ready for dispatch, and it was able to launch to a fire within one hour of being called. In 2011, the exclusive use contract was cancelled by the State of California due to state budgetary constraints.

==== 2006 call-when-needed use ====
Tanker 910 was first used in July 2006 when it fought the Sawtooth Complex fire in San Bernardino County, California. While the fire was burning, Tanker 910 initially sat on the ground at Victorville, California as it had not received Cal Fire approval to operate. The mayor of Victorville, Mike Rothschild, became concerned and investigated why it was not flying, finding that the approval process was expected to take up to six months to complete. After a call to California State Senator George Runner, Cal Fire was able to complete the necessary training and paperwork in a matter of days, with the California certification being granted on July 15, 2006. The following day, July 16, the aircraft made two drops on the Sawtooth fire, and Cal Fire personnel were reported to have said that "the two fire drops made a greater impact on containing the fire than the 12 helicopters drops for the past 10 days."

Later in the same month, the aircraft was used against several smaller California fires, as well as the Columbia Complex Fire in Washington. In September 2006, Tanker 910 was activated by Cal Fire for use against the Day Fire, and the following month it flew against the Esperanza Fire.

==== 2007 contract use ====
Under the terms of the exclusive-use contract, Tanker 910 was activated against the 2007 White Fire, where it flew two runs before incurring its incident. After repairs were completed, it was activated for use on the massive Zaca Fire, the second-largest fire in modern California history, in August 2007. Tanker 910 was also activated for the Moonlight Fire in Plumas County in September 2007. On October 22, Tanker 910 became involved in the effort to extinguish several California wildfires, including the Slide Fire and the Grass Fire near Lake Arrowhead. The next activation came on November 24, 2007, when the tanker joined the effort to fight the Corral Fire above Malibu, California.

==== 2008 fires ====
In June, Governor Arnold Schwarzenegger activated Tanker 910 in response to the state of emergency regarding the Humboldt Fire in Butte County, California, in order to combat the over 20,000-acre (8,100 ha) fire in adverse conditions on rough terrain. It flew sorties out of Sacramento McClellan Airport in Northern California. It made 14 drops, totaling 168,000 U.S. gallons (640,000 L) of retardant, to quell the raging blaze, Hill said. The aircraft also participated in the defense of Big Sur at the end of June and into July.

==== 2009 fires ====
The aircraft was used during the Station Fire in La Cañada and Acton, California, in August 2009.

==== 2009/2010 Australia ====
On December 19, 2009 Tanker 911 arrived in Melbourne, Australia for the Australian fire season. Leased by the National Aerial Firefighting Centre on behalf of the Victoria state government, the DC-10 became operational in Australia in early January 2010, based at Avalon. The Premier of Victoria at the time, John Brumby, described the leasing of the tanker as being part of a record financing program to make sure the state was as fire-ready as possible.

==== 2011 fires ====
In April 2011, and again in September, the aircraft was deployed to Texas to assist in fighting an outbreak of wildfires. Tanker 910 was expected to assist firefighters in tackling the Bastrop County Complex fire, the most destructive single wildfire in Texas history, but it was not deployed due to delays in preparing the fire-retardant mixing facility at Austin-Bergstrom International Airport.

Tanker 910 was ultimately used to fight a prioritized fire north of Houston, Texas, as the Bastrop County Complex fire had been largely contained by September 16. The aircraft operated from Austin-Bergstrom International Airport, conducting fire-fighting operations across the state. Tanker 910 also made drops last fire season on the Wallow Fire in eastern Arizona, which eventually became the largest wildfire in Arizona history, burning more than 800 square miles (2,100 km^{2}).

==== 2012 fires ====
2012 was one of the most active fire seasons in United States history. It also marked the first time that Tankers 910 and 911 were deployed simultaneously in the US On August 17, 2012, Tankers 910 and 911 began operations from Sacramento McClellan Airport on numerous fires in California. The total of retardant dropped had exceeded 1.7 million U.S. gallons (6.4 million liters) as of September 8, 2012. The largest fires included the Ponderosa Fire just outside Lassen Volcanic National Park and the Chips Fire in Plumas National Forest near the Lake Almanor Basin. Tanker 911 flew missions on the Taylor Bridge Fire in the Cascade Range, near Cle Elum, Washington, during the 2012 wildfire season.

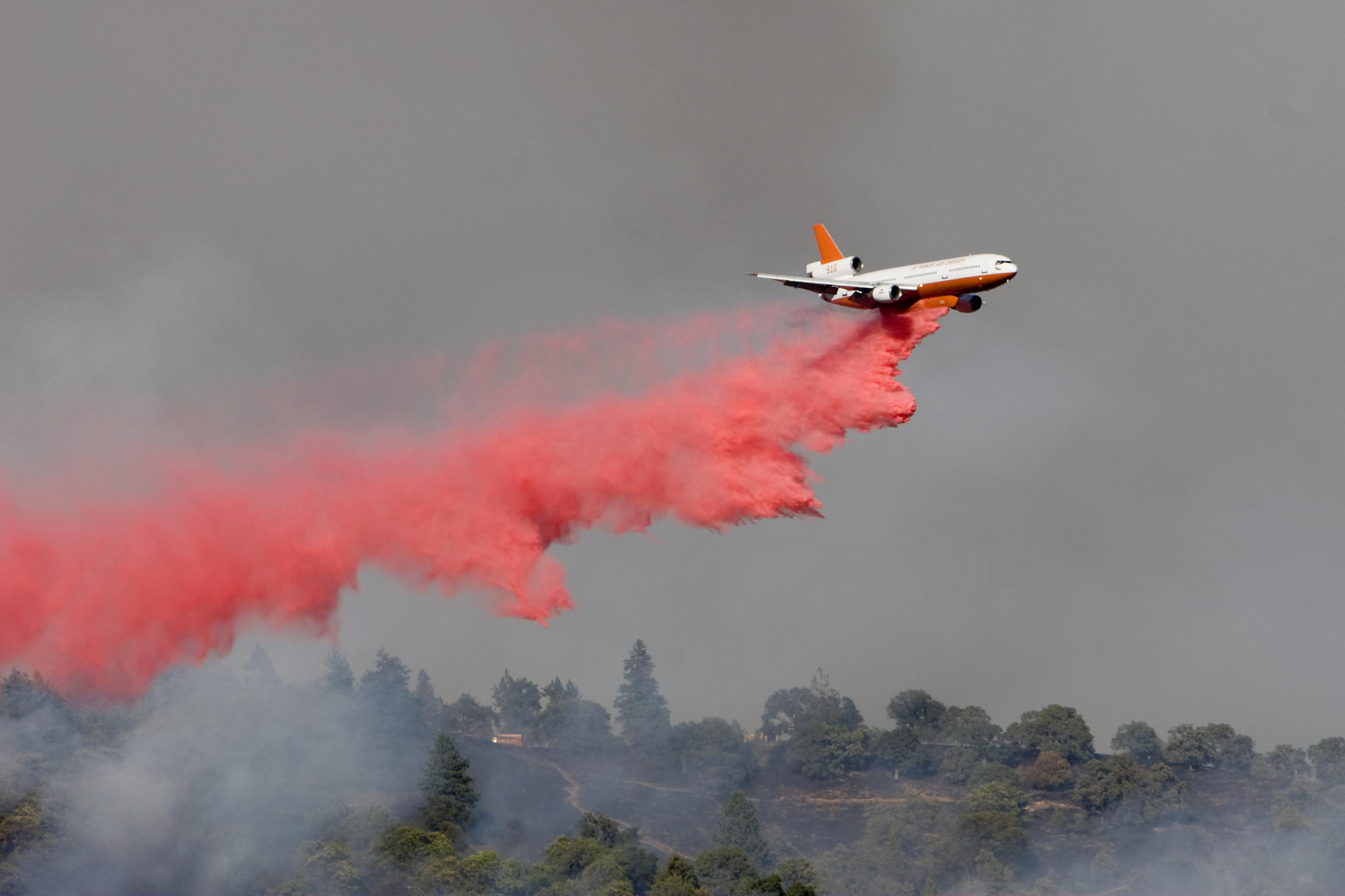
DC-10 tanker in 2013

==== 2013 exclusive use contract ====
On May 6, 2013, US Forest Service Chief Tom Tidwell announced that the Forest Service had issued a notice of intent to award contracts to five companies to provide a total of seven Next Generation airtankers for wildfire suppression. 10 Tanker Air Carrier was among the five companies selected and one of the companies' DC-10s is contracted for five years with the USFS.

==== 2014 ====
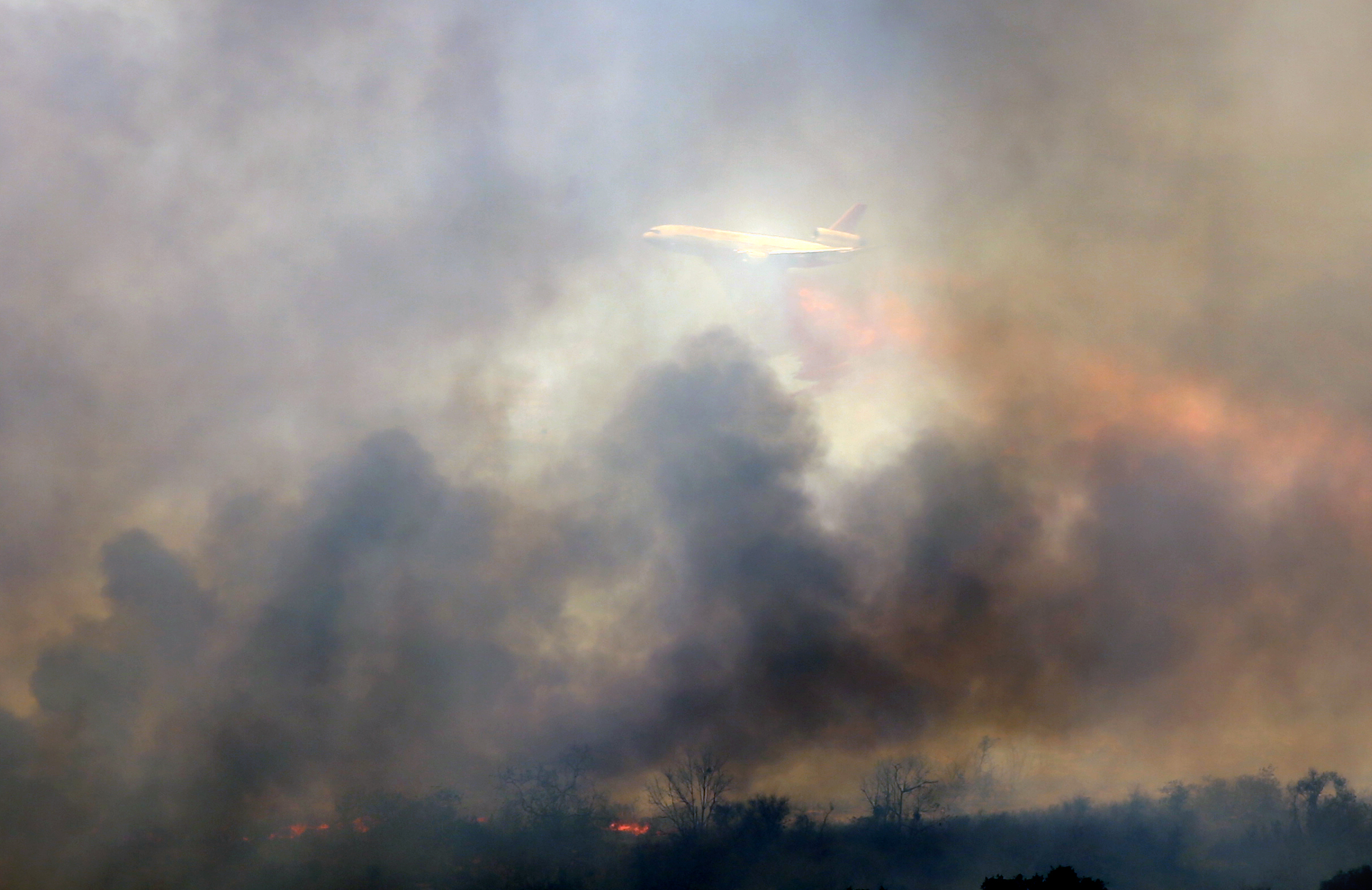
DC-10 drops fire retardant on the Mateo Fire at Camp Pendleton, May 16 2014

In addition to the long term exclusive use contract awarded in 2013, the company also received short term contracts for other available aircraft. Tankers 910 and 911 flew extensively on fires in Washington, Oregon and California, and were joined in early September by Tanker 912. 10 Tanker aircraft flew over 325 fire missions in 2014.

==== 2015 ====
All three aircraft flew for the US Forest Service in 2015 and for a short period in Canada, two on call when needed contracts and one on exclusive use. It was a particularly busy fire season in the American West with extensive work in California, Washington and Oregon. In total over 435 missions were flown by the three 10 Tanker aircraft in 2015.

==== 2015/2016 Australia ====
In late September 2015 Tanker 910 flew from Albuquerque to Australia to begin an exclusive use contract with the State Government of New South Wales. The aircraft was based at RAAF Base Richmond, located 64 km Northwest of Sydney. In the five months Tanker 910 was stationed in Australia, it flew 32 missions in the three Australian states of New South Wales, Victoria and Tasmania. Tanker 910 returned to Albuquerque on February 26, 2016, to begin preparations for the North American fire season.

==== 2016 United States ====
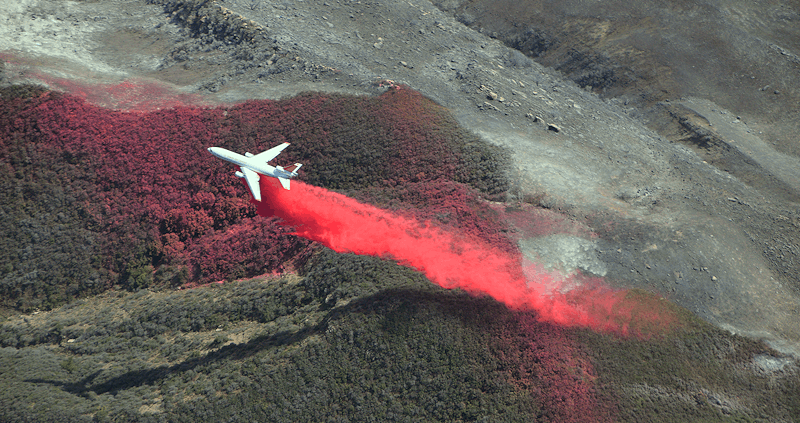
Aerial view of DC-10 Phos-Chek drop on Sherpa Fire June 19, 2016

In June 2016 a DC-10 Air Tanker was used on The Sherpa, San Gabriel Complex and Pine Fires in Southern California.

==== 2017 United States ====
In December 2017 Tanker 911 was seen over the Thomas Fire making multiple drops, based in Santa Maria, California. On December 8, Tanker 911 assisted in mop up operations for the Lilac Fire in Bonsall.

==== 2017/2018 Australia ====
In November 2017, Tanker 912 was contracted to the New South Wales Rural Fire Service for the summer fire season. It was based at was RAAF Base Richmond and on November 3 was named Nancy Bird after pioneering Australian aviator Nancy Bird Walton.

==== 2019 United States ====
In October 2019, Tanker 912 was seen at the Kincade fire while Tankers 910, 911 and 914 were used at the Maria fire in southern California.

==== 2019/2020 Australia ====
During the 2019–20 Australian bushfire season, DC-10 Air Tankers were deployed.

==== 2020 United States ====
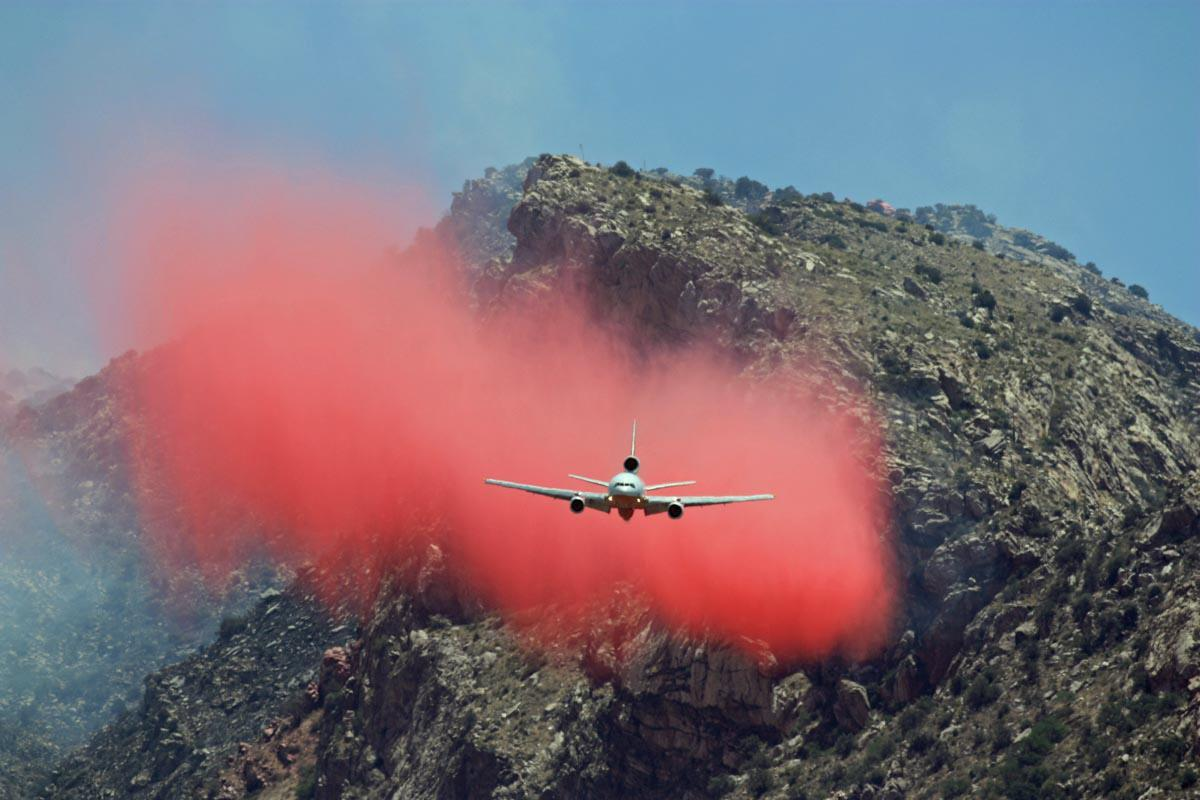
DC-10 airtanker dropping a load of retardant on Patantoc Ridge on the Bighorn Fire in 2020

In June 2020, two DC-10 Air Tankers were deployed to the Catalina Foothills in Tucson, Arizona to prevent the Bighorn Fire from reaching the cities of Tucson and Oro Valley. Pilot Dan Montelli praised the tankers for their maneuverability within the steep mountain ridges and inside the tight canyons of the Catalina Foothills. The tankers dumped 9,400 gallons of retardant at a time from a height of 200 to 300 feet above ground level. The tankers successfully prevented the fire from reaching Tucson, as it continued to burn into the Catalina Foothills, and away from the cities.

On August 19, DC-10 Air Tanker Tanker 910 responded to the Copeland Fire, east of McCall, Idaho. On August 23, Tanker 911 responded to the LNU Lightning Complex Fire in Northern California. At the same time, other DC-10 air tankers were deployed to assist with the Pine Gulch Fire burning over 125,000 acres north of Grand Junction, Colorado.

==== 2021/2022 United States ====
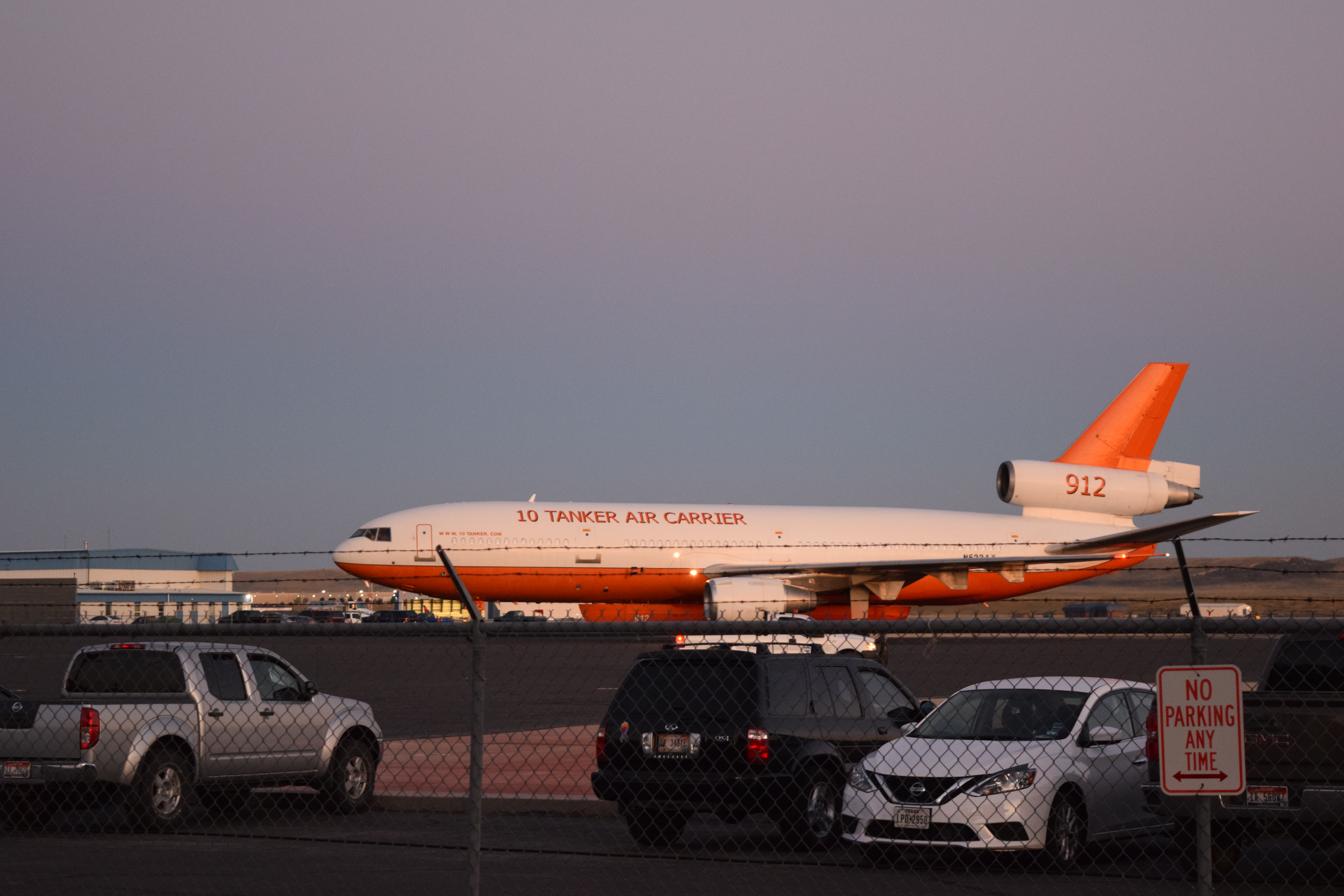
Tanker 912 taxiing at Boise International Airport, July 2020

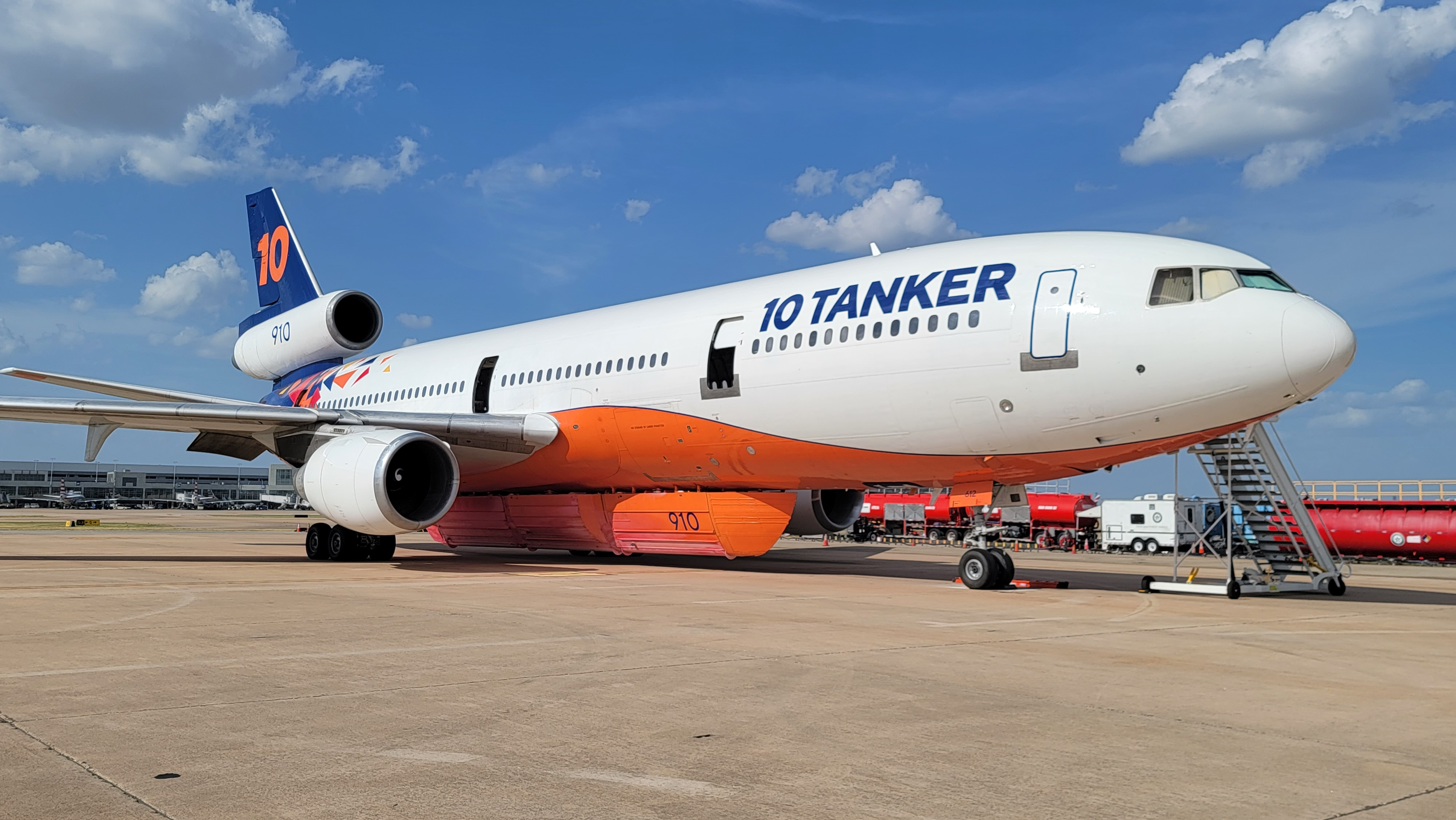
Tanker 910 parked at Austin-Bergstrom International Airport, July 2022

On August 14, 2021, a DC-10 Air Tanker was dispatched to a Forest Fire in Utah, known as the Parleys Canyon Wildfire. A DC-10 Air Tanker, along with Utah National Guard Sikorsky UH-60 Black Hawks and other forest fighting aircraft, contained the fire successfully on August 22, 2021.

In May 2022, DC-10 Air Tankers fought the Calf Canyon / Hermit's Peak complex fire west of Las Vegas, New Mexico.

In August 2022, DC-10 Air Tankers fought the Vantage Highway fire east of Ellensburg, Washington, as well as the Cow Canyon fire south of Ellensburg.

In September 2022, DC-10 Air Tankers responded to the Mosquito Fire in Foresthill, California.

==== 2025 United States ====
On January 8, 2025, Tanker 914 (N603AX) was deployed to the January 2025 Southern California wildfires. 10 Tanker Air Carrier announced that another tanker would be deployed on Friday, January 10. Tanker 912 (N522AX) was deployed to the wildfires on January 10. On November 15th, the FAA grounded all DC-10 aircraft, including the tankers, following the crash of UPS Airlines Flight 2976.

In May 2026, the Federal Aviation Administration (FAA) ungrounded the DC-10 fleet, enabling Ten Tanker Air Carrier's four very large air tankers (VLATs) to resume wildfire suppression operations after completing required structural inspections and repairs.

== Incidents ==
Tanker 910 experienced its only serious aviation incident on June 25, 2007. While on its third run over the White Fire in the Kern County mountains near Tehachapi, California, the aircraft was in a left bank while turning from base to final approach. It encountered sinking air, the left wing dropped, and the aircraft descended 100–200 feet (30–61 m) lower than expected. The left wing struck several trees before pilots were able to power out of the descent. The aircraft climbed to altitude for a controllability check and to dump its load of retardant, then returned to its base in Victorville, California where it made an emergency landing and was grounded pending an investigation, inspection, and repairs.

A post-incident investigation by the US National Transportation Safety Board revealed that the aircraft had suffered damage to the left wing's leading edge slats, ailerons and flaps. Despite the incident, Cal Fire stated that they were happy with the aircraft. The aircraft returned to the sky for a test flight after repairs on July 30, 2007.

== See also ==
- Wildfire suppression
- 747 Supertanker
- Super Scooper
