= Esperanza Fire =

2006 wildfire in Southern California

- Part of the 2006 California wildfires
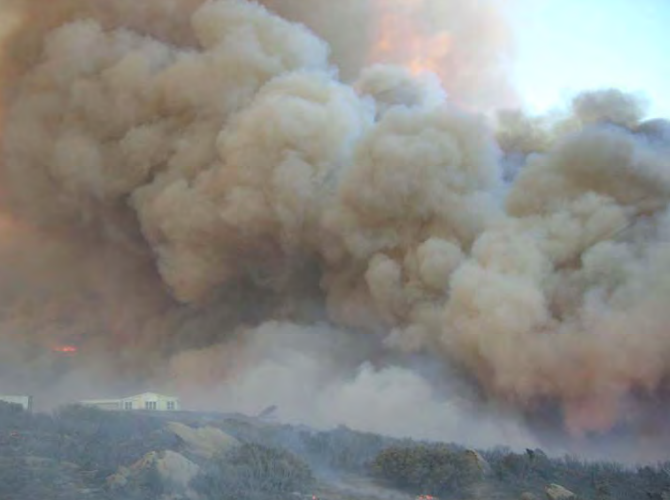
- Fire run looking just above the Accident Site from the Tile House.
- Date: October 26, 2006 –; November 1, 2006
- Location: Cabazon, California
- Coordinates: 33.9139°N 116.7548°W

Statistics
- Burned area: 41,173 acres (64.333 sq mi)
- Land use: Residential; Open space

Impacts
- Deaths: 5 firefighters
- Injuries: 12 firefighters
- Structures destroyed: 34 homes; 20 outbuildings
- Cost: $9.9 million

Ignition
- Cause: Arson
- Perpetrator: Raymond Lee Oyler

Map
- Location of fire in California

The Esperanza Fire was a large, arson-caused wildfire that started on October 26, 2006, in a river wash near Banning, California, United States, west of Palm Springs. The fire experienced an area ignition, with a disputed cause. The incident report's investigation, published by the United States Forest Service, suggests that the ignition was caused by the Santa Ana winds near 7:00 am.

On the day of the fire's ignition, several Forest Service engines from the San Bernardino National Forest were overwhelmed by the fire. One engine, E57, lost its entire crew defending a vacant house, locally known as the Octagon House, that was ultimately destroyed by the fire.

By October 29, it had burned over 41,173 acres (166.62 km^{2}), and 85% contained. On October 30, the fire was fully contained. Five firefighters were killed defending the Octagon House: Jason McKay, Jess McLean, Daniel Kurtis Najera, Mark Loutzenhiser and Pablo Cerda.

The fire was ignited by Raymond Lee Oyler, a serial arsonist who lit several fires in the Banning Pass area. He was apprehended on October 31st. In June 2009, Raymond Lee Oyler was sentenced to death for starting the fire. As of February 2026, Oyler is still on death row. His appeal was overturned by the Supreme Court of California.

== Background ==
In the spring of 2006, an arsonist began setting small fires along the area of Banning, California. On May 16, 3 small fires, all less than an acre combined, were lit, forcing immediate response from local firefighting crews in the area. Each fire was found with a small ignition device composed of 30 wooden matches attached to a cigarette. Another three fires were started on May 19th, slightly more spread out than the first three. Eleven more fires were ignited in the Banning Pass through May, all near roadways and containing an ignition device.

On June 3rd, a new device was spotted at an arson fire. This device had only 3 wooden matches and a cigarette arranged in a simple square. Investigators would later analyze this device and calculate that it would take between 4 and 7 minutes for it to ignite a fire, giving the arsonist a lot of time to make a getaway. This fire was 3 acres in size, almost tripling the previous maximum size.

The arsonist began to learn fire behavior starting in June, showing signs of using slopes to increase fire size and intensity. On June 14th, a 10-acre fire was ignited, stopped by a road nearby which acted as a firebreak. As the summer went by and temperatures increased, fires increased in size, with one, on July 5, reaching 62 acres. Starting at May 16 to June 13, the average land ignited was around 0.83 acres per fire. Between June 14 and October 26, the average rose to 223 acres per fire.

On October 25, the regional National Weather Service issued a red flag warning, warning of intense Santa Ana winds that could cause rapid fire growth.

== Fire origin ==
A wildfire was spotted by a local night security guard on October 26, 2006. At 1:11 am, the Riverside County Sheriff's dispatch office forwarded the 911 call made by the guard to Perris' regional Emergency Command Center. The first callout by dispatch ordered a battalion chief and five wildland fire engines.

A sizeup by the first responding crew, Engine 24, described the fire as covering two acres and expanding very quickly. The fire was climbing up Cabazon Peak, with the upslope effect helping the fire expand four times as fast as it would grow on flat ground.

The first incident commander, Andrew Bennett, ordered 50 more engines, fifteen Interagency Hotshot Crews, 16 bulldozers, 6 air tankers, and 11 helicopters. Bennett quickly realized that the fire was in a position where it could quickly overwhelm the smaller amount of resources in the nearby valley. At 3:07 am, CalFire Division Chief Brenda Seabert took over the incident command role. The IC reports that the fire is 500 acres plus and has reached the top of Cabazon Peak.

== Incident ==
=== Initial Forest Service response ===
Upon being ordered as a resource to the Esperanza Fire, 5 Forest Service engines (numbering 51, 52, 54, 56, and 57) drove up Highway 243 to meet up with two CalFire supervisors (Battalion Chiefs Bob Toups and Mike Mata) who would give them an assignment. The two supervisors discussed which houses were defensible based on several factors, including position, materials, and presence of civilians. Toups entered his pickup and personally evacuated the Garner family, which included a property caretaker.

==== Engines 52 and 57 ====
Meanwhile, the five engines were headed down the Wonderview Road. Engines 52 and 57, captained by Fogle and Loutzenhiser respectively, inspected several homes before splitting at a trail that turned into the chaparral.

Engine 52 went down the trail and Engine 57 continued down the road. Engine 52 discovered a woman named Lili Arroyo, who lived alone and refused to be removed, however a local water and sanitation manager helped to convince her. The fire destroyed the site within fifteen minutes of the evacuation.

In the meantime, Engine 57 was scouting out a house that would later be known as the Tile House. Loutzenhiser confirmed that there was room for two engines, and reported that he would check out the rest of the area. If there were no more defensible houses, he would come back up to the Tile House and rejoin Fogle. Throughout the fire, several of the Forest Service engines used a Forest Service tactical frequency not assigned to the fire, discussing the fire behavior and several engines talking about how they were entering a bowl of terrain.

==== Engines 51, 54, 56, and CalFire elements ====
Engines 51, 54, 56, and an additional, non-Forest Service engine named March Brush 10 (from March Air Force Base), all arrived at a trailer, known as the Doublewide. Toups, who had followed them down, drove past the Doublewide and approached Loutzenhiser at the Octagon House.

Toups supposedly informed Loutzenhiser he was acting as a lookout and advised Engine 57 to retreat to the Doublewide. The two men discussed the weather, topography, and the nearby safety zone, however this conversation sparked great controversy after the event. Toups last saw the crew alive before driving back to the Doublewide at 6:30 am.

=== Forest Service engines hunker down ===
At the Tile House, Engine 52 began to secure the building, charge hoses, and observe fire behavior. The Tile House was designed with fire in mind. Fogle committed the crew to defending the building from any runs of the fire.

Engine 57 had arrived at the Octagon House and relayed a plan "in bits and pieces" to Fogle. Loutzenhiser planned to light a backburn around the house, using a recently completed dozer line. Loutzenhiser repeatedly transmitted that he was in a "good place" and that he had planned to do a burnout. He also mentioned a pool nearby, and offered the other engines the water to fill up their tanks, if they needed it. Between the hours of 6:30 am and 7 am, the crew set up a portable pump using the pool water. This pump was later found in the full throttle position.

=== Blowup ===
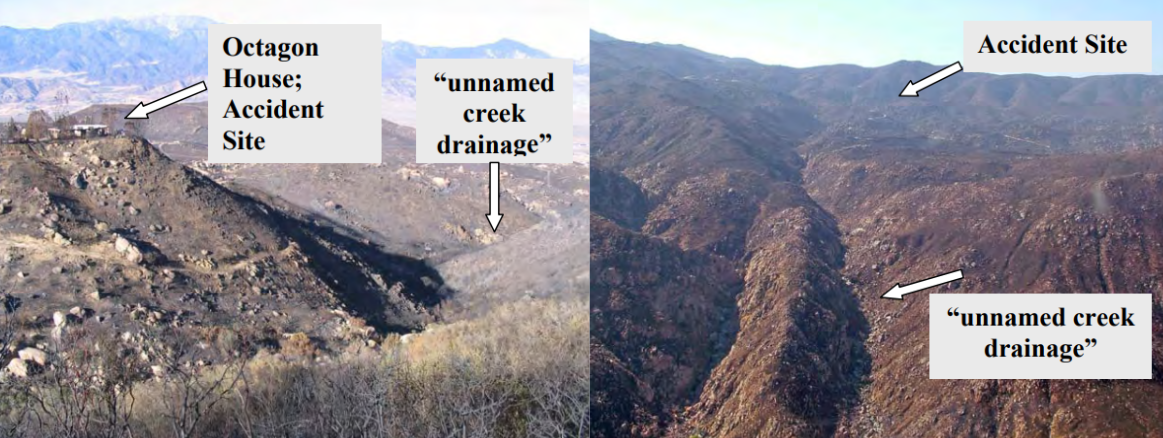
These two images show the Octagon House, where the fatalities occurred, in relation to the creek drainage that carried the blowup to the house. The mouth of the drainage directly faced into the house, carrying hot gases and fire directly into the firefighters' way.

Minutes after 7:00 am, the Santa Ana wind arrived at the eastern aspect of the Banning Pass. Only one weather station, Beaumont, was recording the wind at the time. The station recorded an increase from 7 mph, gusting to 25 mph, to 13 mph, gusting to 31 mph. However, the station suffered an equipment failure and did not record the exact winds between 7 am and 8 am. Between midnight and 7 am, relative humidity stayed at between 5-8%, and the temperature remained 60F.

The winds entered two unnamed creek drainages, causing massive spontaneous ignition in both. This fire raced up one of them, which was aligned northeast to southwest, directly aimed at the ridge face. The source of the area ignition is still disputed. Although the Santa Ana winds were the cited cause, such ignitions generally require calm conditions and specific underlying factors.

==== Doublewide ====
The combined engines attempted to light a burnout using flare guns and drip torches, but the fuels wouldn't take off. The crews began to throw as many ignition devices as possible to light up the brush, but nothing took. They informed Engine 57, who replied with an acknowledgement and then noted that Engine 57 might need some help, and that he would let the rest of them know. Finally, the fire took, and the main fire and the backburn collided and collapsed.

The fire ran up the drainages, blew over the Octagon House, and attacked the Doublewide. The engine crews all gathered in their vehicles and took a head count. All personnel were accounted for. During the dash for the engines, a radio transmission by Engine 57 requested help, saying it was getting hot where he was. After the crews had all gathered, the captain of Engine 51, Gearhart, tried to call Engine 57 as well. He did not get any response, but he heard explosions near the Octagon House.

==== Octagon House ====
The fire launched up at the house, running over 30 mph and covering the Octagon House within five to seven seconds. Immediately after the blowup, a faint yet screaming radio transmission is heard over the radio, with everything but "Engine 57!" unclear. Fogle orders Engine 52 to load up and they begin to drive to the Octagon House. Engine 52 was unable to reach the house until 7:57 am. Gearhart, captain of Engine 51, approached the house on foot from the Doublewide. He saw a firefighter on the ground, and radioed over the net, "I found one, he's dead. They're all dead." The firefighter made a motion in response to the transmission. Gearhart canceled that transmission and ordered all the engines down to the Octagon House immediately.

===== Fatalities =====
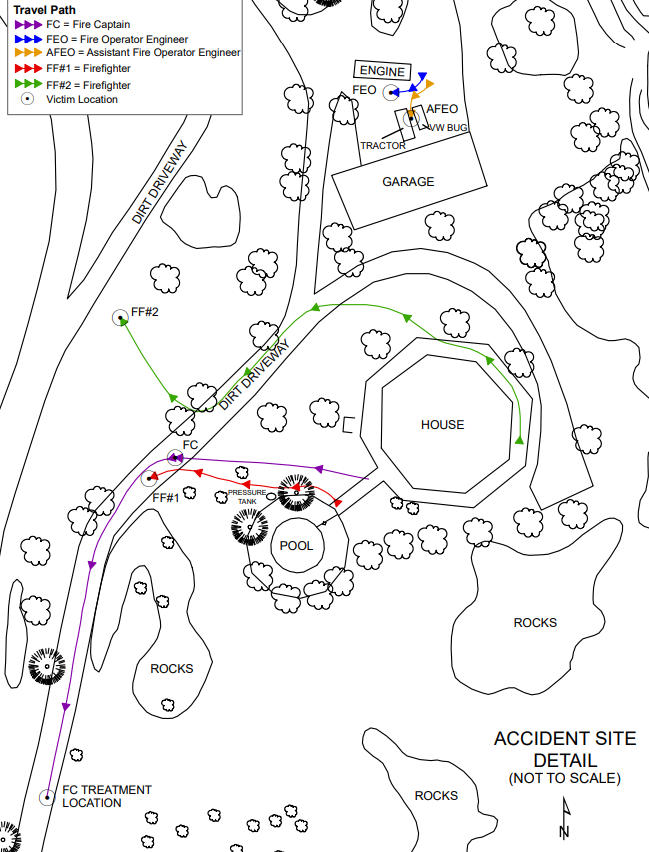
The final paths of the five firefighters aboard Engine 57 on October 26, 2006.

Firefighter Pablo Cerda was the firefighter discovered on the road. He could not speak but was able to understand the conversation. He was severely burned, with burns covering around 95% of his body. Engine captain Gearhart continued down the road, spotting Loutzenhiser, whose airways were damaged by the blowup. Loutzenhiser was able to respond to Gearhart and asked for air. He was reportedly stiff to the touch, and his body was covered in over 90% third degree burns.

Engine crewmembers ran over to assist the downed firefighters, with certified EMTs on all four engines grabbing trauma equipment, burn blankets, and oxygen tanks. They began patient care for the two survivors. Fogle requested two, then four ambulances to the site. However, the terrain made approach nearly impossible. He declined a helicopter due to the smoky conditions and increased risk. Fogle then requested a coroner to the site.

Helicopter 535, carrying several helitack personnel aboard, landed in extremely rough wind conditions, clearing out a helispot for the larger Helicopter 301 to bring Loutzenhiser aboard and transport him to Banning Airport, where he would board an ambulance to Arrowhead Medical Center. Helicopter 305 arrived to take Cerda, where it went directly to Arrowhead. His prognosis was grim, with his survival time limited to a few hours. Mark Loutzenhiser passed away shortly before his wife arrived at the hospital, on October 26. Firefighter Pablo Cerda died five days later, on October 31.

The other three fatalities were found with no shelter deployments, near Engine 57. No shelter deployments were found at all, as if the blowup had caught them by surprise. All three of the other fatalities were burnt completely beyond recognition. The downed firefighters were all removed by 7:09 pm.

=== Containment and mop-up operations ===
On October 26, 2006, FEMA announced it would pay 75% of the costs associated with fighting the fire. The following day, Governor Arnold Schwarzenegger declared a state of emergency in Riverside County and ordered flags at the California Capitol building and all CalFire stations to be flown at half-staff.

The next day, the fire had grown to 24,000 acres. A Type 1 Incident Management Team was ordered to the fire. It eventually burned an estimated 40,200 acres (163 km^{2}) before containment. The fire destroyed 34 houses, 20 outbuildings, and damaged State Route 243. The damage the fire caused is estimated at more than $9 million and was the worst wildfire caused by arson since 1994.

== Criminal investigation ==
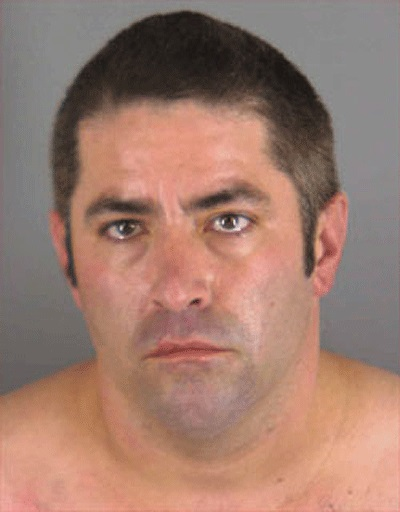
Raymond Lee Oyler

A nearly $600,000 reward was offered for information leading to the arrest and conviction of the arsonist(s). Several governments, as well as private agencies, donated to this reward. The State of California, Riverside County, San Bernardino County, the Morongo Band of Mission Indians, the Soboba Band of Luiseño Indians, and Tim Blixseth, a Coachella Valley logging industry magnate, each donated $100,000.

The Riverside County Sheriff Department's Central Homicide Unit arrested Raymond Lee Oyler, a mechanic from Beaumont, on October 31, 2006, for setting two wildfires in the summer of 2006. Inside his car, authorities found a wig, latex gloves, cigarettes, black spray paint, and a partially burned slingshot that was used to launch incendiary devices into the brush. His DNA was found on two cigarette butts used in other nearby wildfires. Oyler's girlfriend told police that he had bragged about setting fires and had complained that they weren't big enough.

The Riverside County Sheriff's Department announced on November 2, 2006, that Oyler also was charged for his involvement with the Esperanza Fire, with almost two dozen counts of arson and 17 counts of setting fires with an incendiary device. Prosecutors alleged that Oyler, during the summer of 2006, had set as many as 25 fires throughout the San Gorgonio Pass, all of which combined and became more difficult to extinguish.

On November 11, 2006, it was announced that Oyler was also a suspect in the 2003 Old Fire. However, another person was later convicted of setting that fire. On May 9, 2007, Riverside County District Attorney Rod Pacheco said that he planned to seek the death penalty against Oyler. After a week of deliberation, a Riverside jury on March 6, 2009, found Oyler guilty of first-degree murder in the deaths of the five firefighters in the Esperanza Fire. On June 5, 2009, Oyler was sentenced to death for starting the 2006 Esperanza Fire.

On May 5, 2025, the Supreme Court of California affirmed Oyler's conviction and sentence by a 5-2 vote. Chief Justice Patricia Guerrero wrote the majority opinion, while Associate Justice Kelli Evans filed a dissenting opinion joined by Associate Justice Goodwin Liu.

== See also ==
- 2006 California wildfires
- Silver Fire
- Old Fire
- Manzanita Fire
