= Silver Fire =

2013 wildfire in Southern California

- Part of the 2013 California wildfires
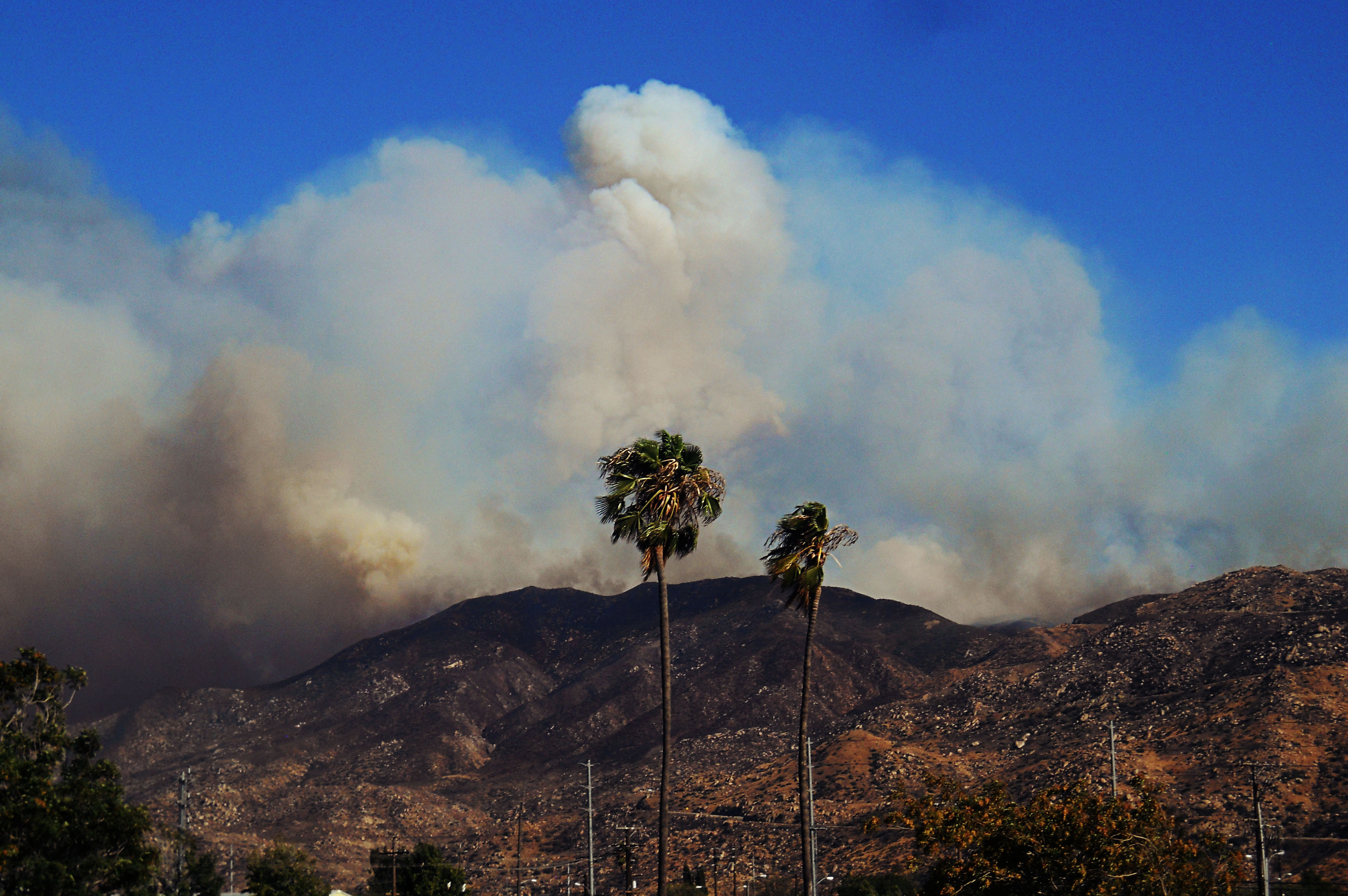
- The Silver fire burning in the San Jacinto mountains south of Banning on Wednesday, August 7.
- Date: August 7, 2013 –; August 12, 2013
- Location: San Jacinto Mountains, Riverside County, California
- Coordinates: 33.86157°N 116.90427°W

Statistics
- Burned area: 20,292 acres (82 km^{2})

Impacts
- Structures lost: 48
- Cost: $9.9 million (2013 USD)

Map
- Location of fire in Southern California.

The Silver Fire was a wildfire that burned in the San Jacinto Mountains south of Banning and Cabazon in Riverside County, California in August 2013. The fire, which started close to Poppet Flats Road near Highway 243, was first reported on Wednesday, August 7, 2013, at around 2:05 pm, just south of Banning. By Friday, August 9, the wildfire was a reported 18,000 acres (7,300 ha) in size and Gov. Jerry Brown had declared a state of emergency in the fire area.

== Events ==
Soon after the fire ignited, the nearby communities of Poppet Flats, Twin Pines and Silent Valley were put under a mandatory evacuation order, displacing at least 1,500 residents. Highway 243 was soon shut down as the fire quickly jumped the highway. By 10 pm Wednesday evening, the fire had ballooned to an estimated 6,000 acres (2,400 ha) in size with no estimated containment as the fire raged primarily eastbound. Two firefighters and one civilian were reportedly injured, however the extent of their injuries were unclear as of Wednesday evening. Evacuation centers were set up at Hemet High School, Beaumont High School and San Jacinto Valley Animal Campus.

== See also ==
- 2013 California wildfires
- Manzanita Fire
- Esperanza Fire
