= 2006 California wildfires =

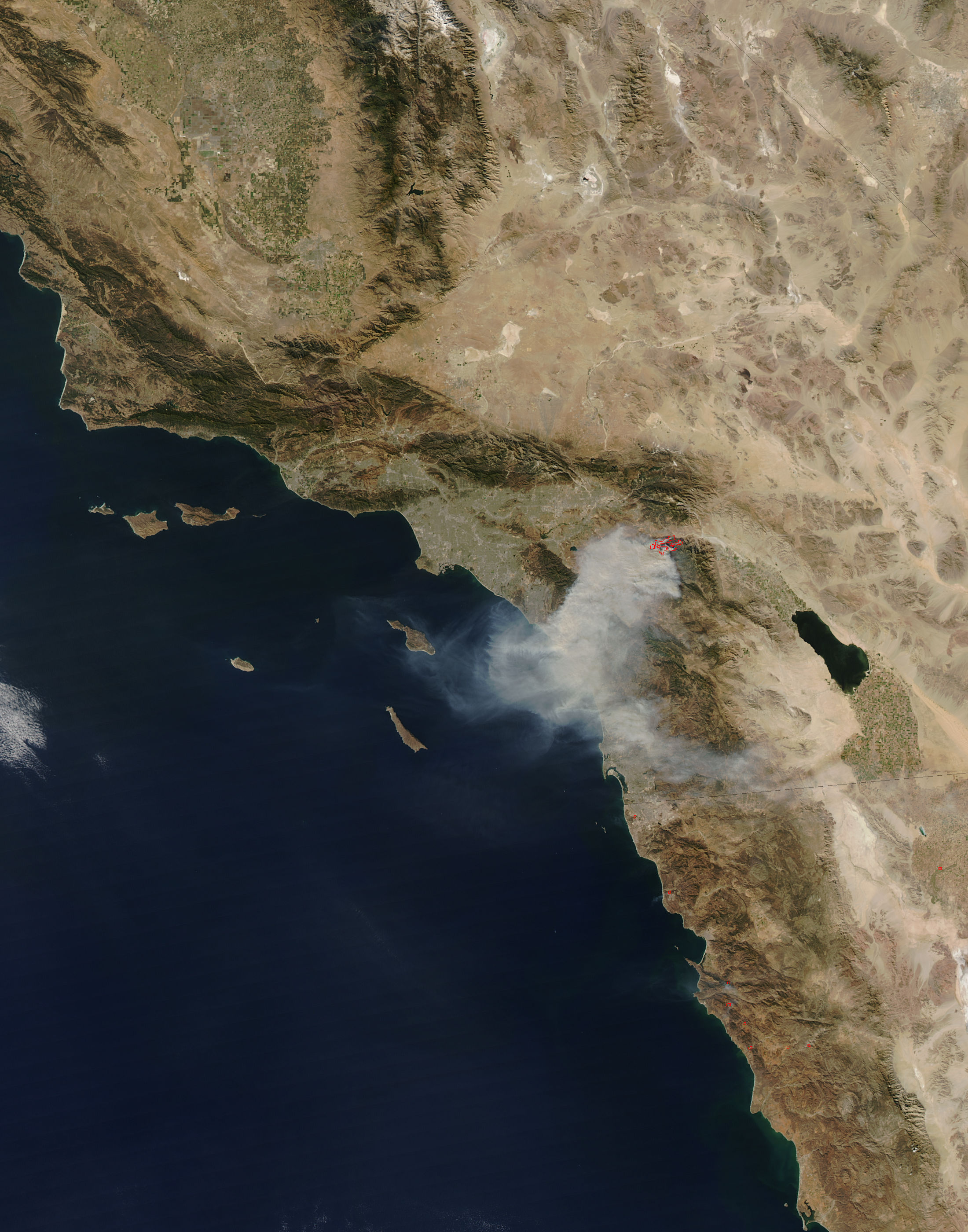
- NASA satellite image of the Esperanza Fire

Statistics
- Total fires: 8,202
- Total area: 736,022 acres (2,978.58 km^{2})

Impacts
- Deaths: 7 firefighters, 2 civilians killed
- Cost: >$266.2 million (2006 USD)

There were 8,202 fires that burned 736,022 acres (2,978.58 km^{2}) of land in the US state of California in 2006.

== Background ==
The timing of "fire season" in California is variable, depending on the amount of prior winter and spring precipitation, the frequency and severity of weather such as heat waves and wind events, and moisture content in vegetation. Northern California typically sees wildfire activity between late spring and early fall, peaking in the summer with hotter and drier conditions. Occasional cold frontal passages can bring wind and lightning. The timing of fire season in Southern California is similar, peaking between late spring and fall. The severity and duration of peak activity in either part of the state is modulated in part by weather events: downslope/offshore wind events can lead to critical fire weather, while onshore flow and Pacific weather systems can bring conditions that hamper wildfire growth.

== List of wildfires ==
Below is a list of all fires that exceeded 1,000 acres (4.0 km^{2}) during the 2006 fire season. The list is taken from CAL FIRE's list of large fires.

Name	County	Acres	Km^{2}	Start date	Contained Date (Note: Containment means that fire crews have established and secured control lines around the fire's perimeter. These lines are artificial barriers, like trenches or cleared vegetation, designed to stop the fire's spread, or natural barriers like rivers. Containment reflects progress in managing the fire but does not necessarily mean the fire is starved of fuel, under control, or put out.)	Notes
Sierra	Riverside	10,584	42.8	February 6, 2006	February 6, 2006	
Hotlum	Siskiyou	3,019	12.2	February 25, 2006	February 27, 2006	4 structures destroyed
Torch	Fresno	1,964	7.9	May 13, 2006	May 14, 2006	
Stuhr	Stanislaus	1,418	5.7	May 26, 2006	May 26, 2006	
Alpaugh	Tulare	1,700	6.9	May 27, 2006	May 27, 2006	
Perkins	Santa Barbara	14,988	60.7	June 19, 2006	June 26, 2006	7 structures destroyed
Boulder Complex	Plumas	3,500	14.2	June 25, 2006	July 5, 2006	2 structures destroyed
Observation Complex	Lassen	4,300	17.4	June 25, 2006	June 30, 2006	
Goodale	Inyo	3,750	15.2	June 26, 2006	June 29, 2006	
Yolla Bolly	Tehama	1,247	5.0	June 27, 2006	June 27, 2006	
Del Puerto	Stanislaus	2,590	10.5	June 30, 2006	July 3, 2006	
Pedro	Tuolumne	2,000	8.1	July 3, 2006	July 5, 2006	
Pushwalla Complex	Riverside	2,000	8.1	July 7, 2006	July 10, 2006	
Happy Complex	Modoc	1,780	7.2	July 9, 2006	July 9, 2006	2 firefighter fatalities
Canyon	Stanislaus	34,000	137.6	July 9, 2006	July 17, 2006	11 structures destroyed
Sawtooth Complex	San Bernardino	62,000	250.9	July 9, 2006	July 20, 2006	273 structures destroyed, 1 civilian fatality
Millard Fire Assist	Riverside	24,210	98.0	July 9, 2006	July 9, 2006	
Beck	San Luis Obispo	1,500	6.1	July 11, 2006	July 12, 2006	
Midway	Alameda	6,400	25.9	July 11, 2006	July 11, 2006	
Creek	Lassen	1,234	5.0	July 18, 2006	July 21, 2006	
Coytoe	Tulare	1,325	5.4	July 20, 2006	July 21, 2006	
Olive	Merced	25,007	101.2	July 21, 2006	July 21, 2006	
Ricco	Monterey	14,506	58.7	July 22, 2006	July 27, 2006	
Three Rocks	Fresno	8,400	34.0	July 22, 2006	July 22, 2006	
Horse	San Diego	16,681	67.5	July 23, 2006	August 1, 2006	
Happy Camp	Siskiyou	3,318	13.4	July 23, 2006	September 24, 2006	
Uncles Complex	Siskiyou	30,454	123.2	July 23, 2006	October 31, 2006	1 structure destroyed
Oorleans Complex	Humboldt	15,710	63.6	July 24, 2006	September 30, 2006	1 structure destroyed
Empire	Los Angeles	1,094	4.4	July 25, 2006	July 25, 2006	
Hunter	Mendocino	16,296	65.9	July 26, 2006	July 26, 2006	
Hoy	Siskiyou	1,283	5.2	July 26, 2006	July 28, 2006	1 structure destroyed
Bar Complex	Trinity	100,414	406.4	July 27, 2006	July 27, 2006	
Sage	Modoc	4,855	19.6	July 27, 2006	August 5, 2006	
Junction	Trinity	3,126	12.7	July 29, 2006	July 29, 2006	1 structure destroyed
Kingsley	Tehama	6,854	27.7	August 2, 2006	August 2, 2006	
Cottonwood	Kern	2,346	9.5	August 5, 2006	August 6, 2006	
Quail	Los Angeles	4,864	19.7	August 13, 2006	August 16, 2006	2 structures destroyed
Pigeon	Trinity	6,452	26.1	September 2, 2006	October 16, 2006	
Day	Ventura	169,702	686.8	September 4, 2006	October 2, 2006	11 structures destroyed
Ralston	Placer	8,423	34.1	September 5, 2006	September 18, 2006	2 structures destroyed
Sawmill	Mono	7,434	30.1	September 14, 2006	September 15, 2006	2 structures destroyed
Orchard	Riverside	1,580	6.4	September 16, 2006	September 16, 2006	
Ranch	Riverside	1,670	6.8	September 17, 2006	September 17, 2006	
Pinnacles	San Bernardino	2,370	9.6	September 19, 2006	September 21, 2006	
Bassetts	Sierra	2,114	8.6	September 19, 2006	September 26, 2006	
Noble	Mendocino	1,014	4.1	September 24, 2006	September 30, 2006	
Phelps	Fresno	1,600	6.5	October 25, 2006	October 25, 2006	
Esperanza	Riverside	40,200	162.7	October 26, 2006	October 31, 2006	54 structures destroyed, 5 firefighters and 1 civilian killed
Shekell	Ventura	13,600	55.0	December 3, 2006	December 5, 2006	7 structures destroyed
Westside	Kern	4,025	16.3	December 7, 2006	December 9, 2006	
