= Pioneertown, California =

Unincorporated community in California, United States

- unincorporated community
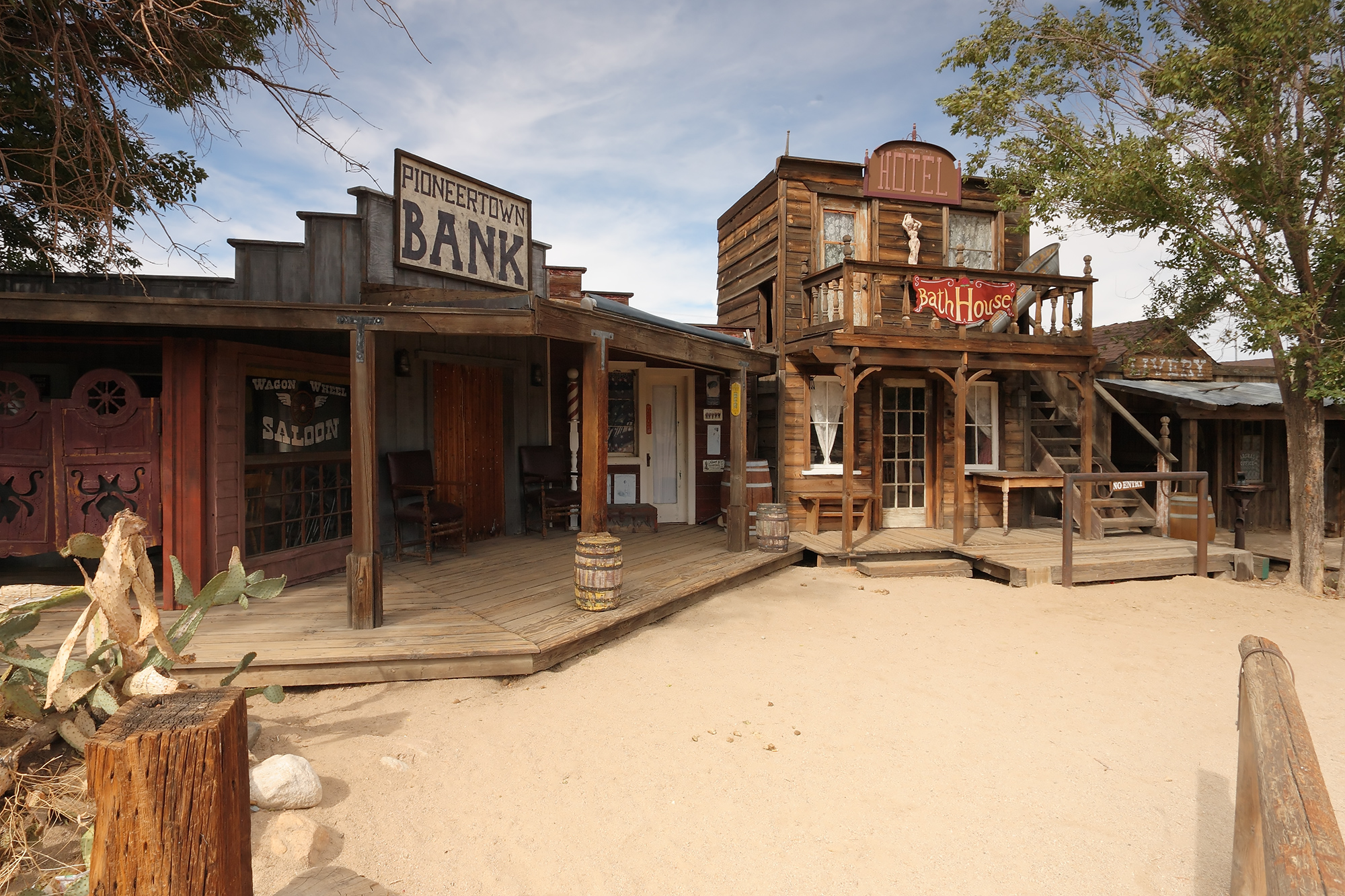
- Saloon, bank, bath house and livery stables on Mane Street, Pioneertown, CA

- Location within the state of California Pioneertown, California (the United States)
- Coordinates: 34°09′16″N 116°29′55″W
- Country: United States
- State: California
- County: San Bernardino
- Elevation: 4,055 ft (1,236 m)

Population (2006)
  - Total: 420
- Time zone: UTC−08:00 (Pacific (PST))
  - Summer (DST): UTC−07:00 (PDT)
- ZIP Codes: 92268
- Area codes: 442/760
- FIPS code: 06-57358
- GNIS feature ID: 247574

Pioneertown is an unincorporated community of the Morongo Basin region of the High Desert in San Bernardino County, California, United States. It is an 1880s-themed town developed as a shooting location for actors working on Western films and TV series which includes businesses and residences. The Mane Street Historic District is listed on the National Register of Historic Places. The winding, 4-mile (6.4 km) drive northwest to Pioneertown from Yucca Valley has been designated a California Scenic Drive, and the area is now surrounded by both privately and federally protected lands. The Sawtooths are a small mountain range to the south, while Black Hill is to the north.

== History ==
Actor Dick Curtis started up the town in 1946 as an 1880s themed live-in motion-picture set. The town was designed to provide a place for production companies to reside while also using their businesses and homes in movies.

Pioneertown's founders intended the area to be a residential area with Mane Street acting as both a movie set and the town's commercial district.

Hundreds of Westerns and early television shows were filmed in Pioneertown, including The Cisco Kid and Edgar Buchanan's Judge Roy Bean.

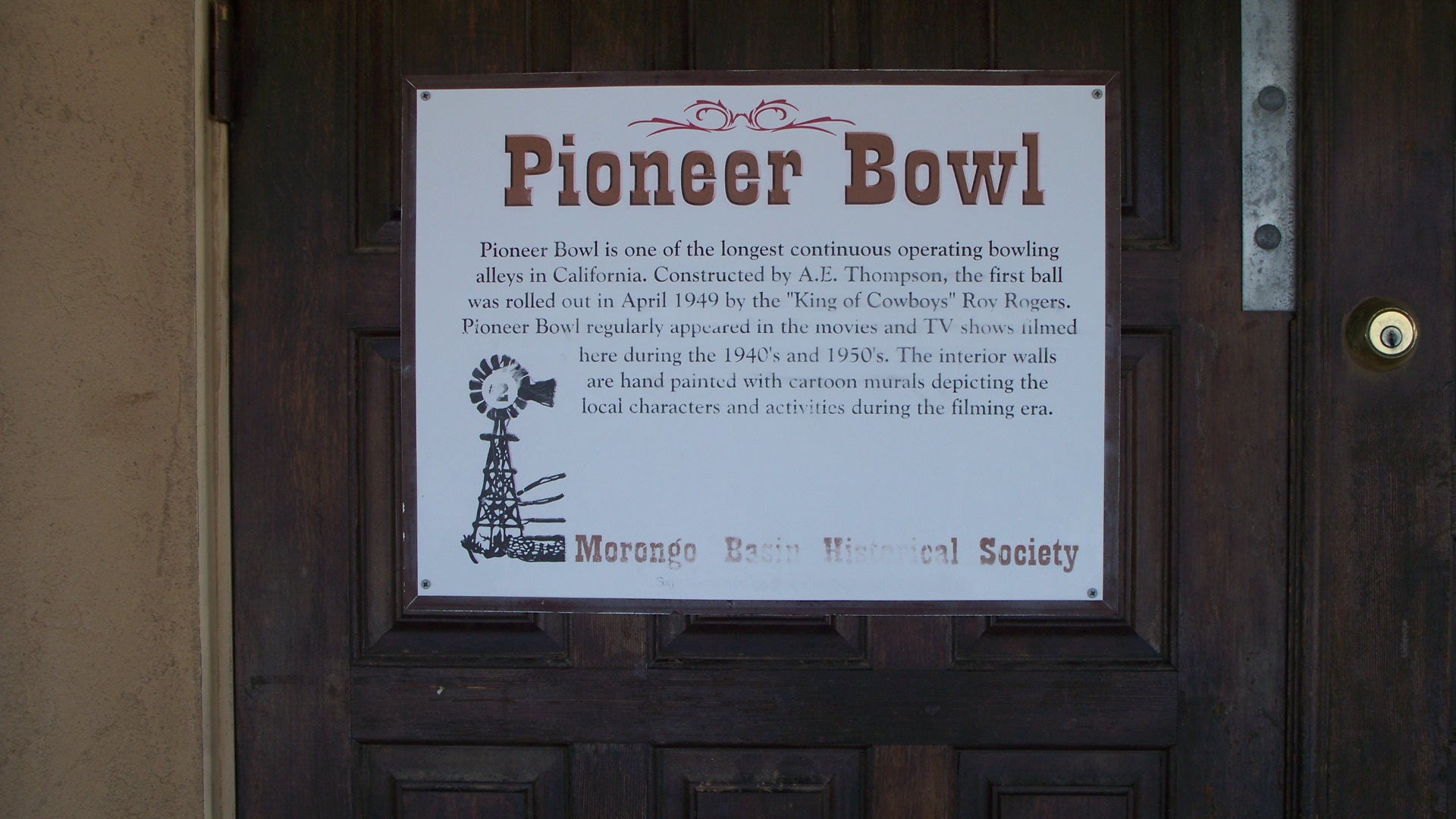
Pioneer Bowl

Dick Curtis, Roy Rogers and Russell Hayden were some of the original developers and investors. Gene Autry filmed his weekly show in town for five years, using the buildings and businesses as part of the film set.

The Pioneer Bowl is an operating bowling alley. The third building to be built in Pioneertown, Pioneer Bowl served as a recreational venue for residents, actors, and crew after filming. When western films were no longer the predominant genre of the Hollywood movie industry, Pioneer Bowl became a busy league venue for hundreds of bowlers in the high desert.

The Thompson and White family partnership built the bowl in 1946. The first post office on Pioneertown was located inside the bowling alley. Movie extras for the westerns being filmed, would come to the bowling alley on their breaks in costume to get the mail.

Pioneertown is now a mecca for live music at Pappy and Harriet's. The drama Motel Jerusalem was filmed in the Pioneertown motel and Pioneer Bowl in early 2001 and Christopher Coppola also directed a short quirky film entitled "Gunfight at the Red Dog Saloon". The werewolf movie Howling 7, a local cult classic, was filmed in Pioneertown using some local residents.

In 2020, Pioneertown's Mane Street area was recognized as a historic district by the National Register of Historic Places.

=== 21st century ===
As of 2025, Pioneertown had a population of around 600. Many residents live only part-time in Pioneertown.

In July 2006, parts of Pioneertown were burned in the Sawtooth Complex fire, which also burned into Yucca Valley and Morongo Valley. Firefighters managed to save the historic movie-set buildings, but much of the surrounding desert habitat was damaged. Among the buildings saved was Pappy & Harriet's Pioneertown Palace, a longtime local club and landmark built within the town's original and only gas station, which counts among its regular patrons notable musicians, including Eric Burdon and Robert Plant of Led Zeppelin. The fire made headlines around the world, including Italy where the Pioneer Bowl road sign was shown with smoke billowing behind it. In the late 1980's, All 10,000 feet of Pioneer bowl was stuccoed and the wood porch became concrete to protect it from fire. Every shop and building was saved by firefighters and local residents with tractors stamping out embers and fighting the wind. The fire started with a lightning strike to a Joshua Tree, was knocked down, and then reignited 3 days later with the high winds.

Mane Street in the commercial district of Pioneertown is open to the public as a pedestrian only street.

On January 18, 2019, the Kidz Bop Kids used Pioneertown as the set for their music video for the cover of Lil Nas X's song, "Old Town Road".

In 2023, San Bernardino County officials announced plans to apply generic commercial zoning to Pioneertown's historic district.

In 2024, Pioneertown received media attention when Alanna Gold, a participant in the reality show Selling Sunset falsely claimed on the show and in multiple interviews to have been the owner of the town. Gold issued a retraction and apology in response to community backlash. Gold's apology clarified that she co-owns several properties in the town along with other parties, including a music festival producer and RH CEO Gary Friedman.

== Notable people ==
- Nancy Wilson (1937–2018), jazz singer and actress

== Gallery ==
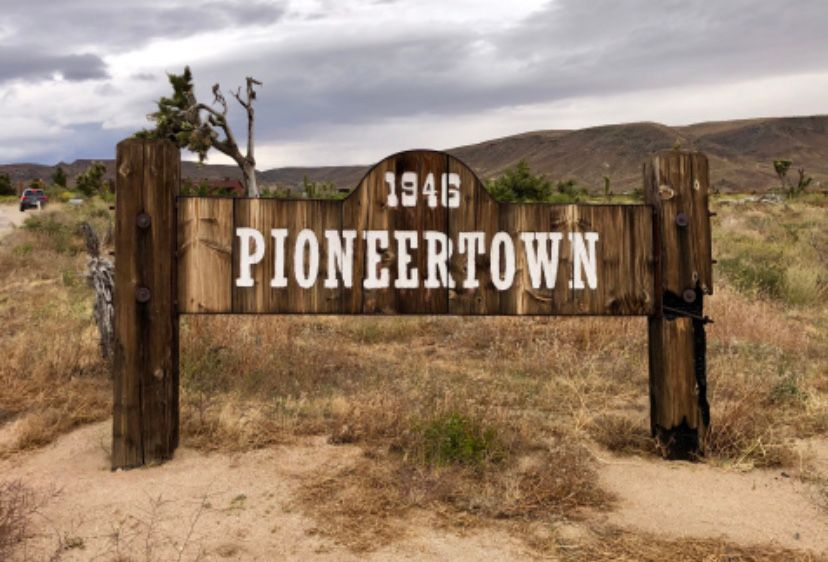
Sign at the entrance to the town on Pioneertown Road

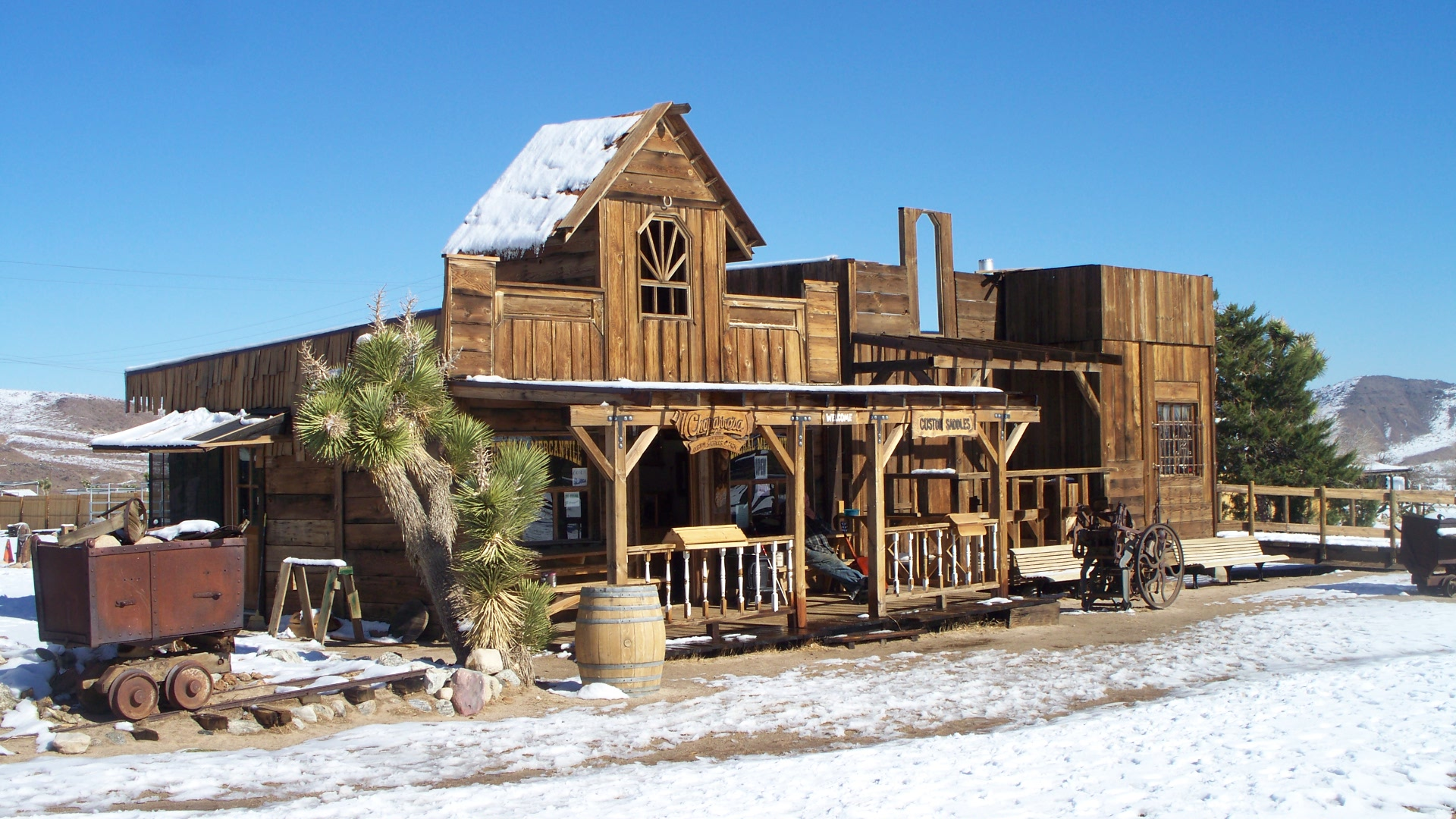
Chapparosa Saddlery on Mane Street

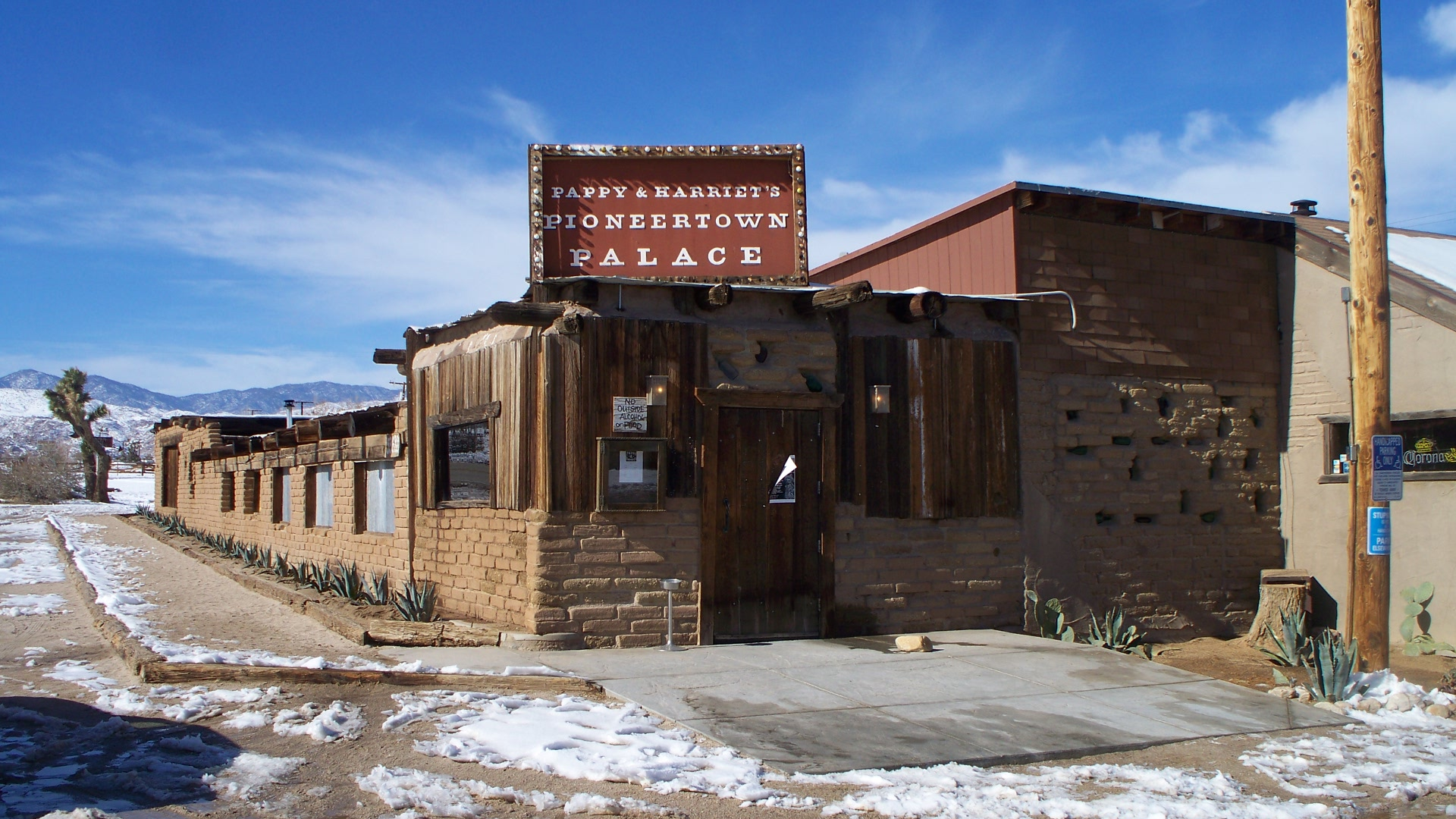
Facade of Pappy & Harriet's Pioneertown Palace

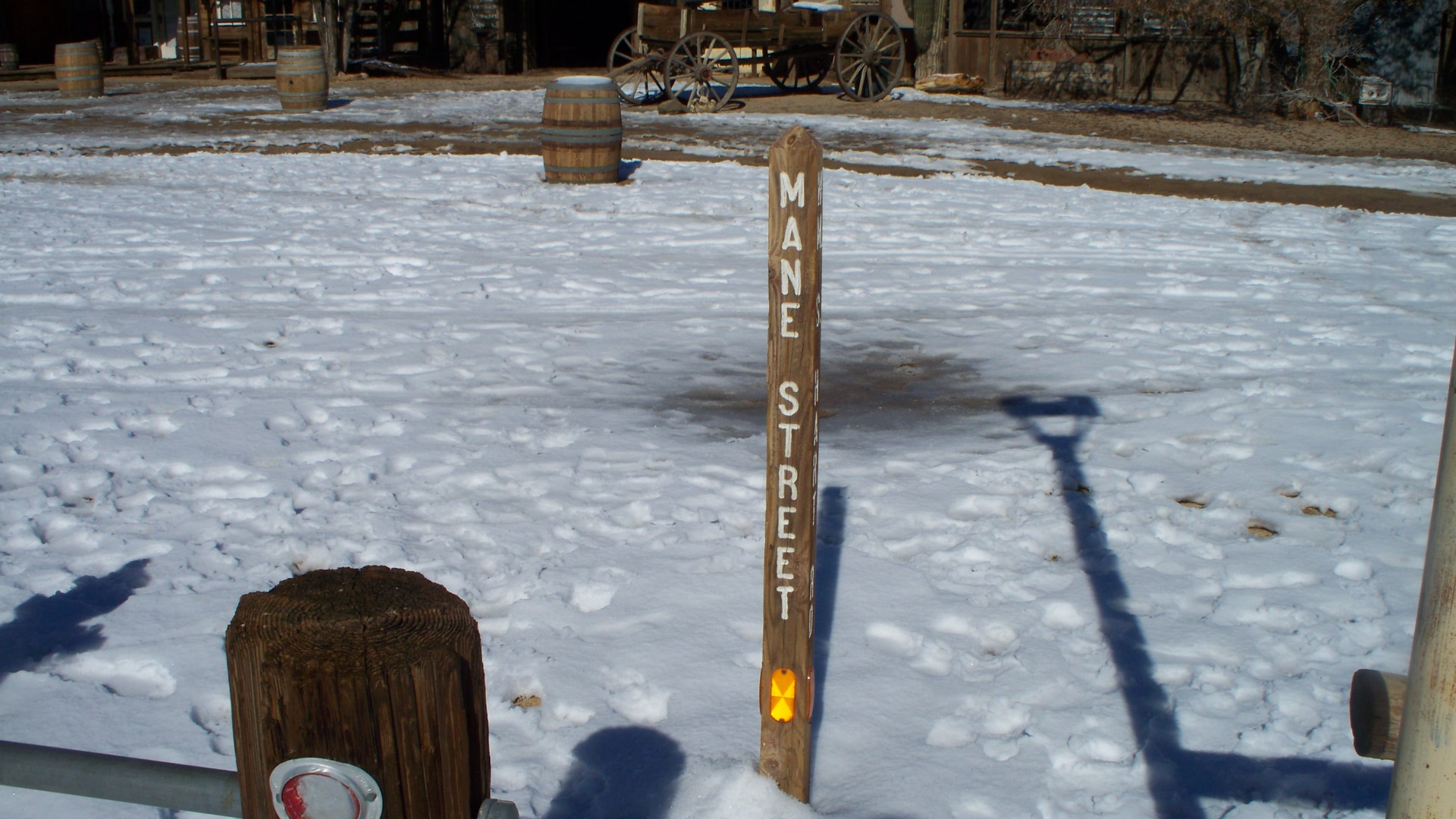
"Mane Street" street sign

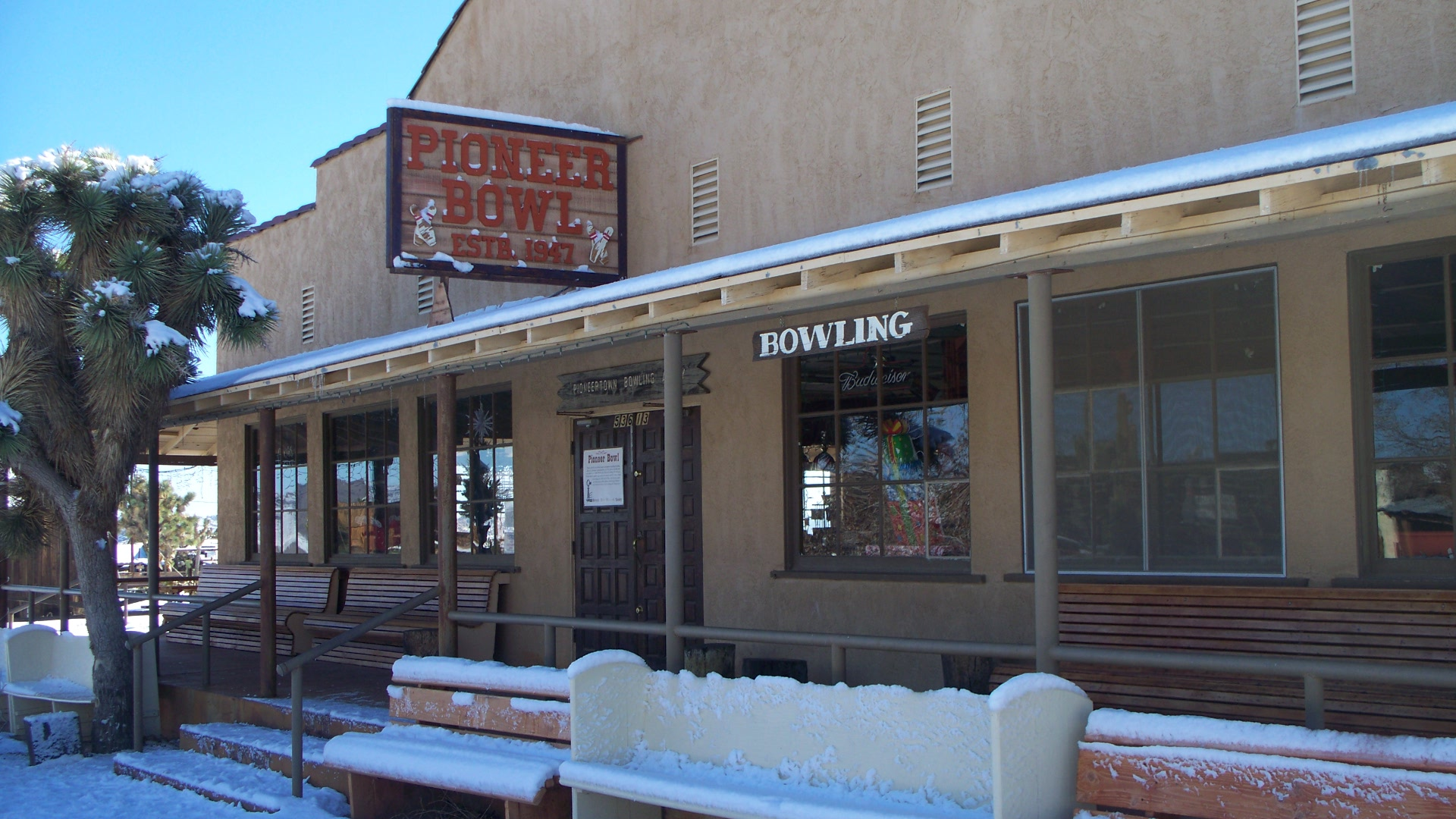
Entrance to Pioneer Bowl

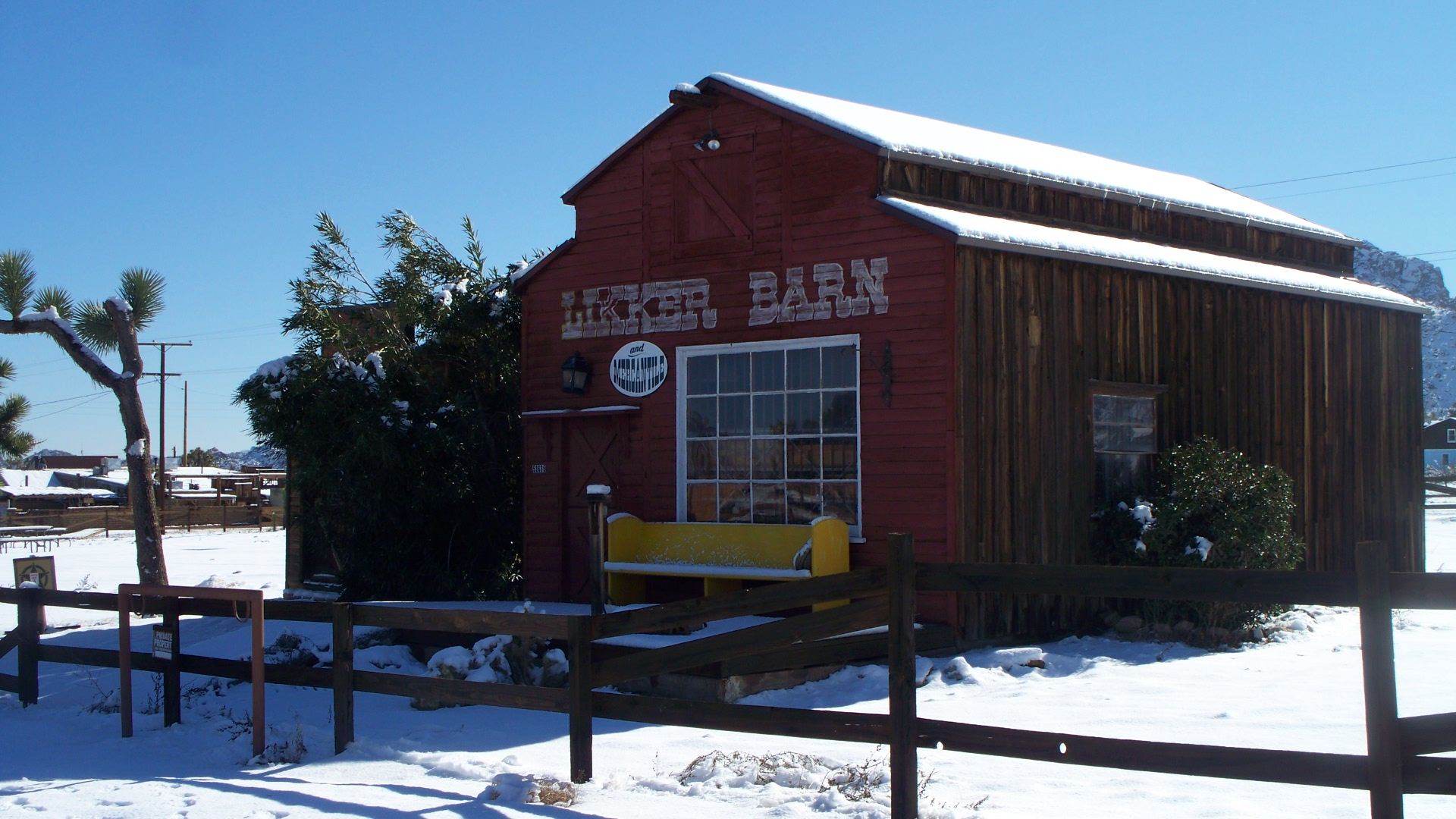
"Likker Barn" and mercantile building

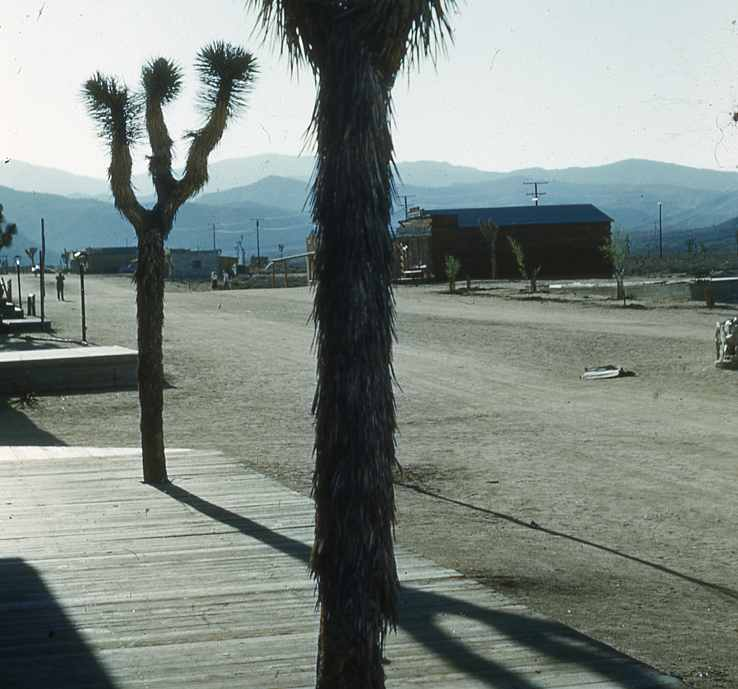
Pioneertown wide street accommodated camera dolly.
