= Sawtooths =

Mountain range in California, US

- Location within California

Highest point
- Elevation: 1,519 m (4,984 ft)

Dimensions
- Length: 4 mi (6.4 km) east-west
- Width: 2.5 mi (4.0 km) north-south

Geography
- Country: United States
- State: California
- District: San Bernardino County
- Range coordinates: 34°8′28.06″N 116°30′52″W
- Topo map(s): USGS Yucca Valley North, Rimrock

The Sawtooths are a small mountain range in southern San Bernardino County, California.

They are in the Mojave Desert east of the San Bernardino Mountains, northwest of the city of Yucca Valley, California and south of the unincorporated Pioneertown. Although Chaparrosa Spring and Chaparrosa Wash are in the Sawtooths, Chaparrosa Peak is part of the San Bernardino Mountains; the boundary between the two ranges is not clear.
