= Manzanita Fire =

2017 wildfire in Southern California

- Part of the 2017 California wildfires
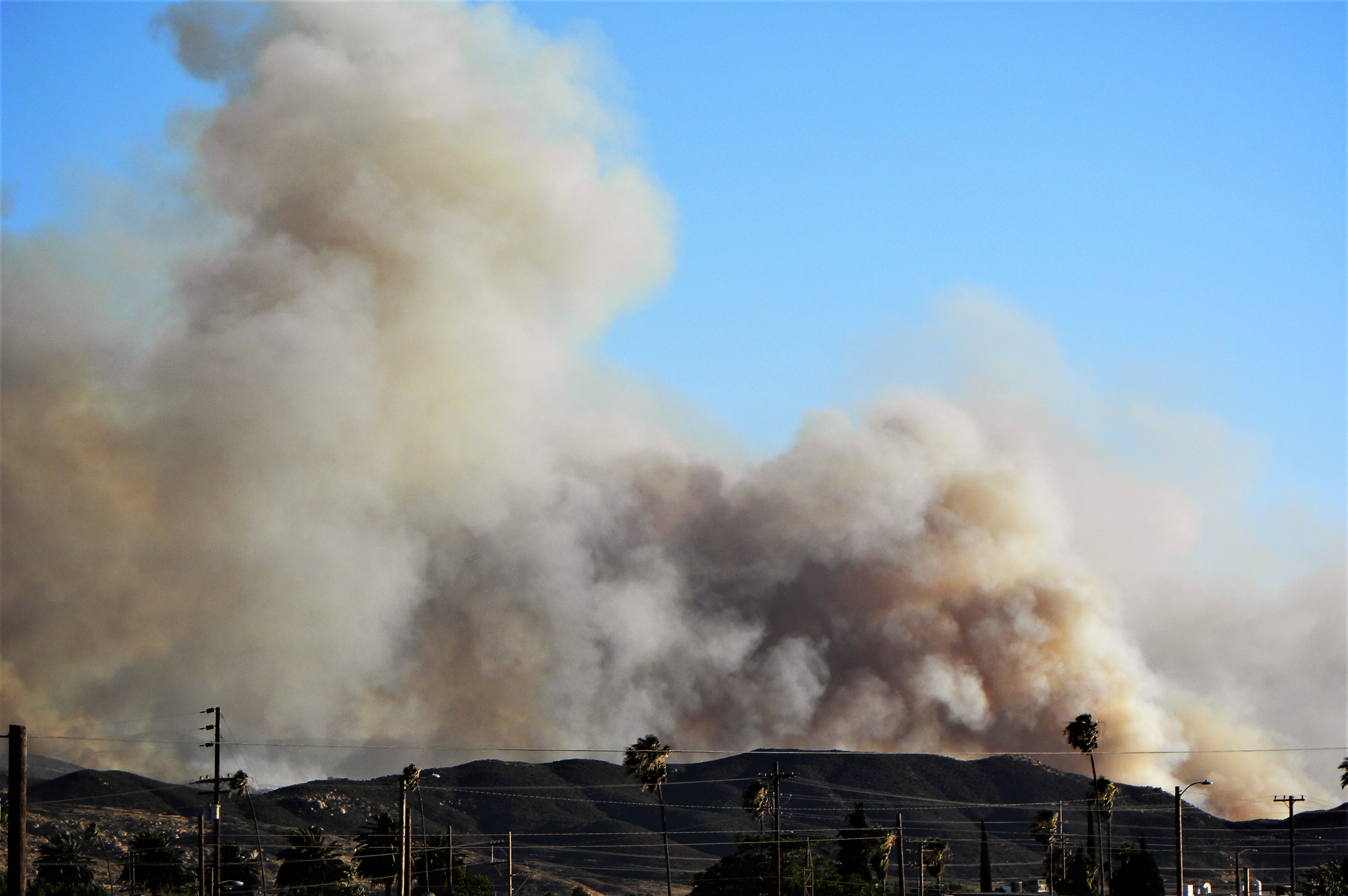
- The Manzanita fire expanding to 1,200 acres as seen from Banning, California on June 26, 2017.
- Date: June 26, 2017 –; June 30, 2017
- Location: San Jacinto Mountains, Riverside County, California
- Coordinates: 33.88°N 116.997183°W

Statistics
- Burned area: 6,309 acres (26 km^{2})

Impacts
- Injuries: 2

Ignition
- Cause: Traffic Collision and subsequent fire

Map
- Location in Southern California

The Manzanita Fire was a wildfire that burned south of the towns of Beaumont and Banning near Highway 79 in Riverside County, California during June 2017. The fire had consumed some 6,309 acres (2,553 ha) and was burning eastward towards the community of Poppet Flats and Highway 243. Fanned by Red Flag conditions, the Manzanita fire ignited from a traffic collision that grew to over 1,200 acres (490 ha) within several hours of burning. The communities of Poppet Flats, Silent Valley and Highland Springs were threatened for a time but no structural damage occurred during this incident. The fire was fully contained on Friday, June 30.

== Events ==
The fire was initially reported at 3:10 pm on Monday, June 26, off of Highway 79 in the Lamb Canyon area, burning with a rapid rate of spread in heavy grass and chaparral. First reported to be 40 acres in size, the fire soon ballooned to 500 to then 1,200 acres within the next three hours as hot, dry, windy conditioned fueled the flames burning in already rugged terrain. Highway 79 was closed in both directions, from Beaumont Avenue to Gilman Springs Road, due to the severe fire actively burning on both sides of the highway. However the highway was reopened later that evening. An evacuation warning was issued as of 6:30 p.m., that day, for Highland Home Road east to Highway 243, as well as the communities of Poppet Flats and Silent Valley. Late Monday, many residents across the Inland area received an emergency alert via their cellphones telling them to “evacuate now.” However, the sending of that warning was in fact an error. At 11:45 pm, 8 hours after the fires ignition, Cal Fire reported the fire to be 5,000 acres in size. Overnight, the fire advanced toward the Silver Fire burn area of August 2013 where it would later burn itself out.

By Tuesday morning, the fire was estimated at 5,800 acres in size with no structures destroyed. However, the areas of Poppet Flats and Silent Valley were still under an evacuation warning. As the day progressed, the fire was seemingly largely contained as there was a lack of smoke or active flame within the burn area. However, the fire remained at 20% containment due to the Red Flag fire conditions that persisted, with winds blowing through the area at 40 mph. Over 1,300 firefighters were on scene battling the fire by Tuesday evening.

On Wednesday morning, officials had updated the incident burn area to 6,309 acres in size due to better mapping overnight. Containment grew from 20 percent to 77 percent as firefighters were being released from the incident, dropping the number of personnel from 1,300 to 575. The evacuation warning for the area of Highland Home Road as well as the San Jacinto Mountain communities of Poppet Flats and Silent Valley were also lifted Wednesday.

Cooler temperatures and a lack of wind in the fire area assisted firefighters in gaining the upper hand on the incident. On Friday evening, four days after the fire broke out, the Manzanita fire was declared 100 percent contained at 6,309 acres (26 km^{2}) in size.

== Cause ==
The fire was determined to have been caused by a traffic collision on Highway 79 in the Lamb Canyon Landfill area when a vehicle veered off the roadway and went down an embankment, igniting the brush. Two individuals from the vehicle, both a woman and a man, escaped with non-life-threatening injuries.

== See also ==
- 2017 California wildfires
