= Day Fire =

2006 wildfire in Southern California

- Part of the 2006 California wildfires
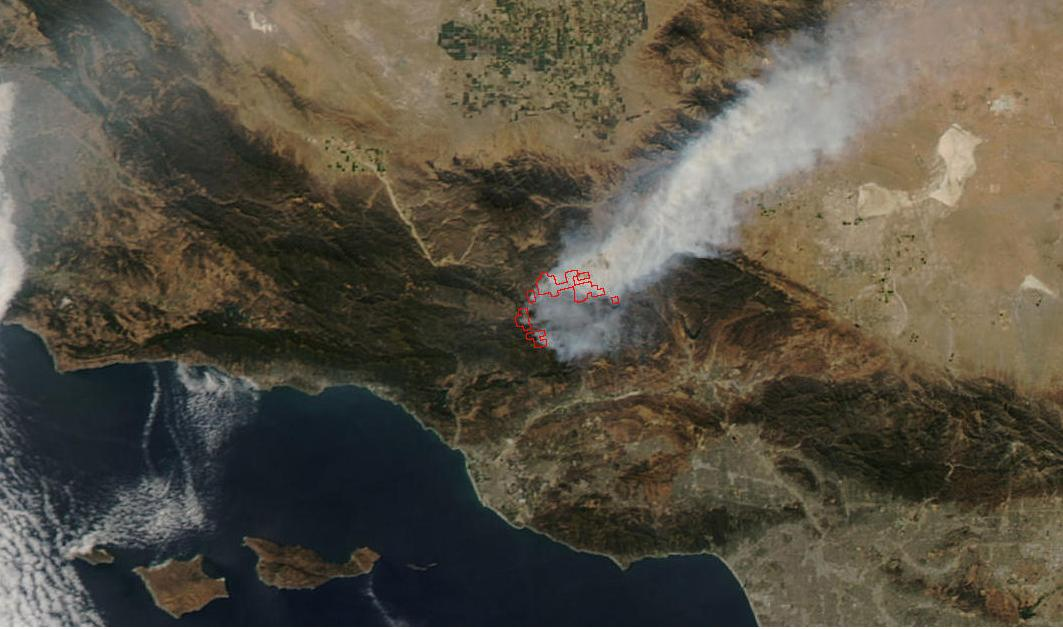
- Day Fire as seen via MODIS satellite on September 19.
- Date: September 4, 2006 –; October 13, 2006
- Location: Topatopa Mountains, Los Padres National Forest, Ventura County, California

Statistics
- Burned area: 162,702 acres (658 km^{2})

Impacts
- Cost: $70.3 million (2006 USD)

Ignition
- Cause: Arson
- Perpetrator: Steven Emory Butcher

The Day Fire was a devastating wildfire that burned 162,702 acres (658 km^{2}) of land in the Topatopa Mountains, within the Los Padres National Forest in Ventura County, southern California.

== History ==
The fire was the largest of the 2006 California wildfire season. The fire started on Labor Day September 4, 2006, and by October 1, had cost $70.3 million; at one point, the Day Fire had 4,600 active firefighters combating it.

The Day Fire burned approximately 162,702 acres (658.43 km^{2}) of both Los Padres National Forest (97.4%) and privately owned lands. The fire started on the Ojai Ranger District, in the congressionally designated Sespe Wilderness. The Sespe Wilderness is under the federal jurisdiction of the United States Forest Service. In addition to the land burned in the wilderness area, 1,943 acres (8 km^{2}) of private land was burned in Lockwood Valley and the Mutau Flat area. A total of eleven structures were reported destroyed, including one residence and ten outbuildings.

The Ojai Post, which was founded by Tyler Suchman on February 27, 2006, received considerable visibility in the community with its coverage of the Day Fire, the sixth largest wildfire in California history.

=== Cause ===
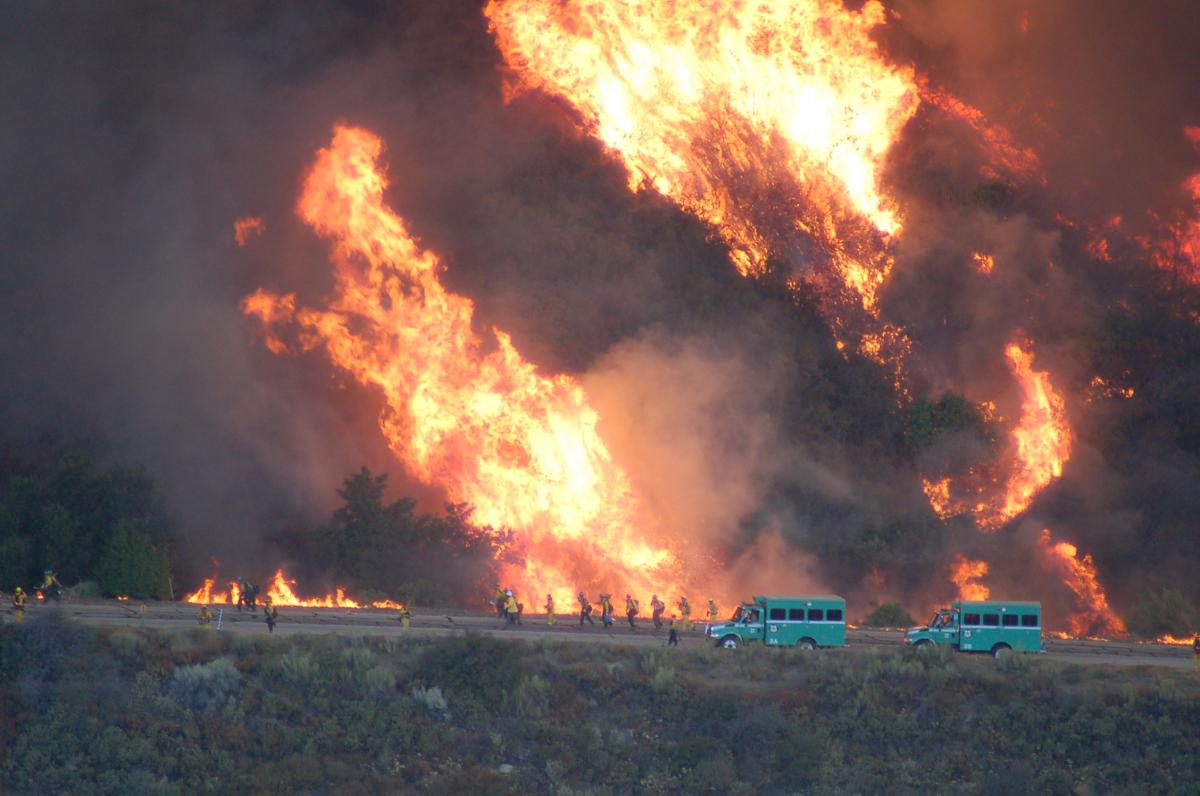
Day Fire, near Old Hwy 99 September 12 2006 burns behind the Texas Canyon Hotshots.

The Day Fire was determined to be human caused. Specifically, a debris burn consisting of clothing, ammunition, and other items were illegally ignited during fire restrictions. Ignited material coming out of the debris burn came in contact with surrounding dry grasses, causing a wildland fire to occur. On September 7, 2006, an approximately 47 year old man walked out of the Day Fire with burns to his face. The man was the one who notified the authorities there was a fire burning in the Los Padres National Forest.

In 2009, the man was found guilty of starting the fire and ordered to four years in prison.

== See also ==
- Los Padres National Forest topics
- Topatopa Mountains topics
