= Sawtooth Complex Fire =

2006 wildfire in Southern California

- Part of the 2006 California wildfires
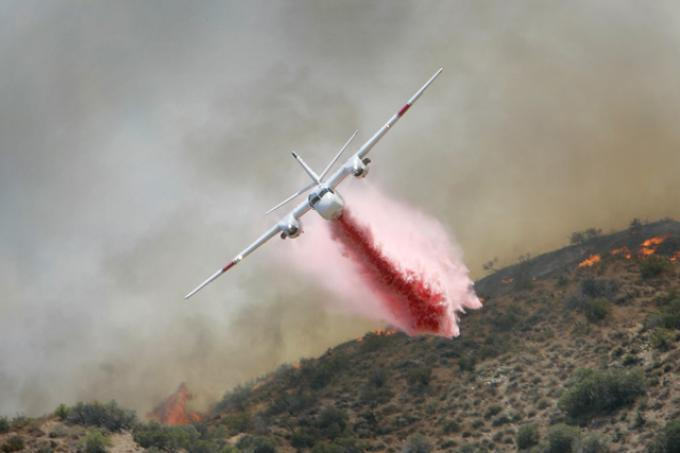
- CDF Grumman/Marsh S-2F3AT airtanker working the Sawtooth Complex fire. U.S. Forest Service photo.
- Date: July 9, 2006 –; July 19, 2006
- Location: Pioneertown, California

Statistics
- Burned area: 61,700 acres (250 km^{2})

Impacts
- Deaths: 1 Civilian
- Injuries: 17
- Structures lost: 50 residences; 8 mobile homes; 171 outbuildings; 220+ vehicles
- Cost: $16.8 million

Ignition
- Cause: Lightning

The Sawtooth Complex fire was a group of wildfires in San Bernardino County in the U.S. state of California in the summer of 2006. The Complex was made up of the Sawtooth, Waters, and Ridge fires, and burnt in chaparral two miles (3.2 km) east of Pioneertown.

The Sawtooth Complex fire was started by lightning on July 9, 2006 at 8:30 am PDT. The fire burned 61,700 acres (250 km^{2}) and destroyed 50 homes, 8 mobile homes, 13 garages, 171 outbuildings, 191 cars and pick up trucks, 3 R.V.s, 27 trailers, 2 railcars, 9 tractors. 12 residences were damaged. There were 17 minor injuries and 1 civilian fatality.

Residents of Pioneertown, Skyline Ranch, Pipes Canyon, Gamma Gulch, northern Morongo Valley, Burns Canyon and Rimrock were placed under mandatory evacuations.

Pioneertown is the site of several historic structures dating back to 1940s Hollywood film production. While some buildings in Pioneertown were destroyed, the historic structures were spared.

At 5:00 pm PDT on July 14, the Sawtooth Complex fire merged with the Millard Complex fire.

The fire was 100% contained on July 18.
