= Carnegie library =

Libraries donated by Andrew Carnegie

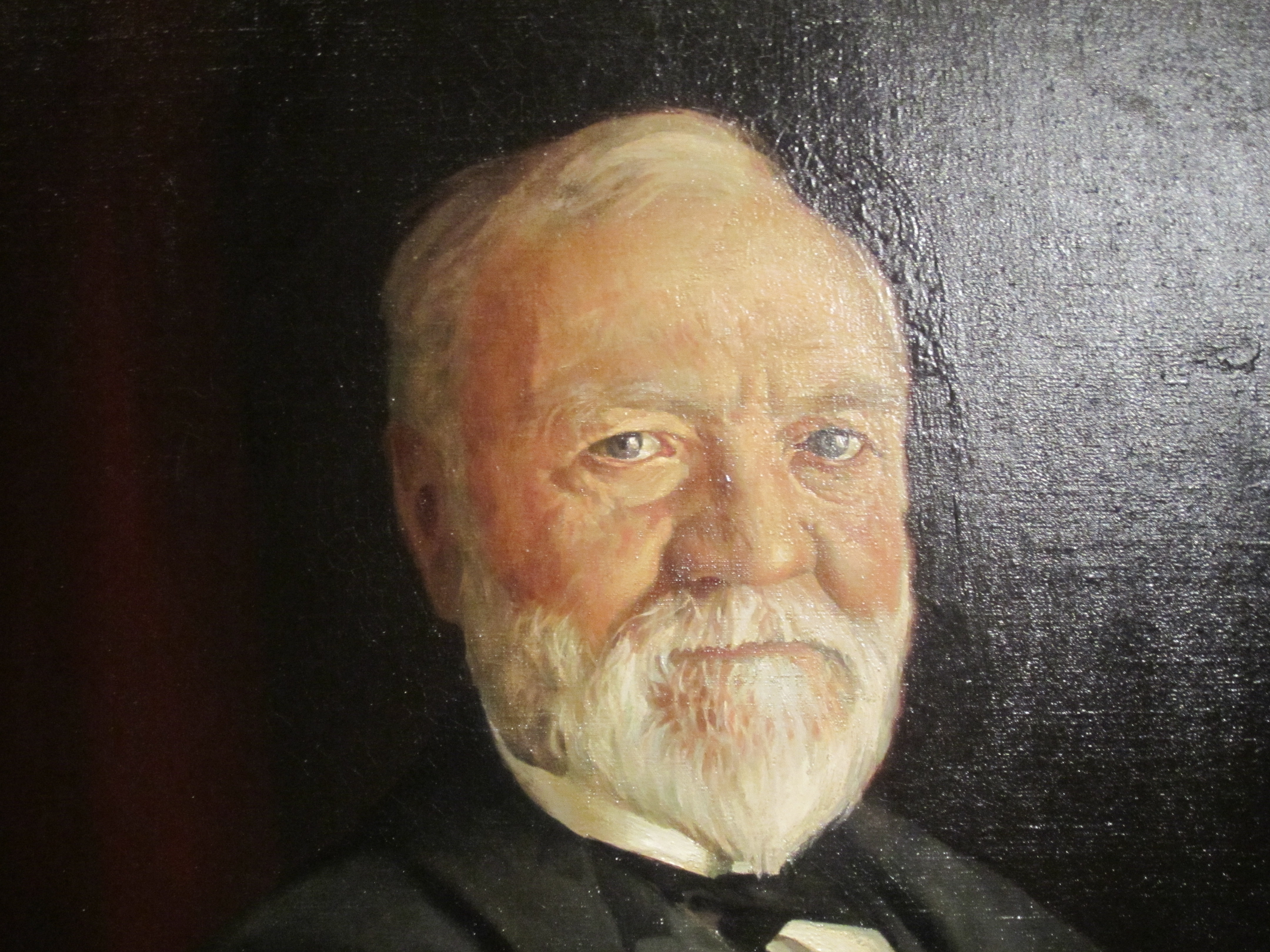
Andrew Carnegie, c. 1905, National Portrait Gallery

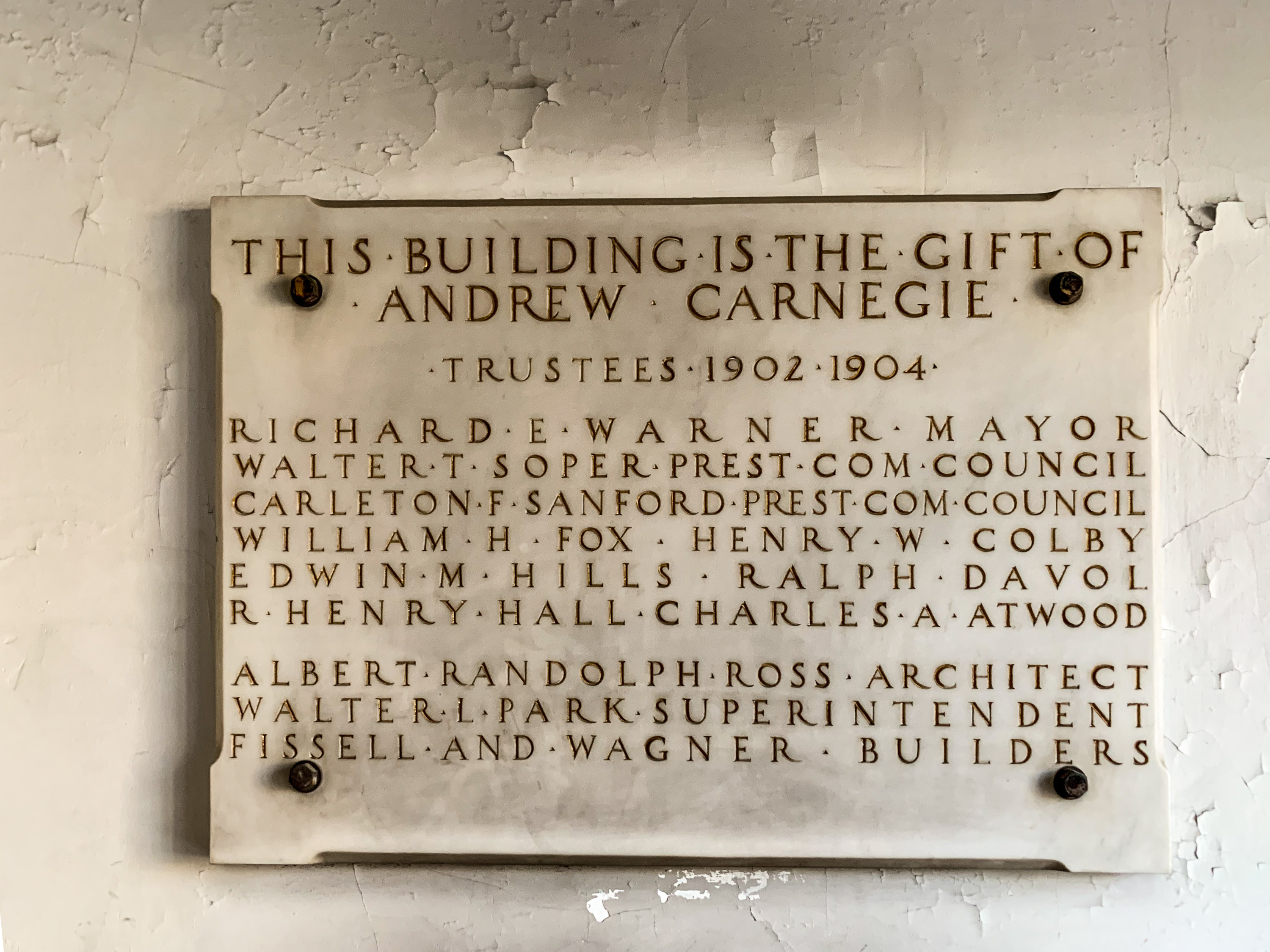
Plaque at the Taunton Public Library in Massachusetts

A Carnegie library is a library built with money donated by Scottish-American businessman and philanthropist Andrew Carnegie. A total of 2,509 Carnegie libraries were built between 1883 and 1929, including some belonging to public and university library systems. Most of them – 1,689 – were built in the United States, with 660 in the United Kingdom and Ireland, 125 in Canada, and 25 others in Australia, South Africa, New Zealand, Serbia, Belgium, France, the Caribbean, Mauritius, Malaysia, and Fiji.

At first, Carnegie libraries were almost exclusively in places with which he had a personal connection: his birthplace in Scotland and the area around his adopted hometown of Pittsburgh, Pennsylvania. In 1899, Carnegie began to fund to libraries outside these areas. Ultimately, very few of the towns that requested a grant, committing to his terms for operation and maintenance, were refused. By the time the last grant was made, he had funded the construction of nearly half of the 3,500 libraries in the United States.

== History ==
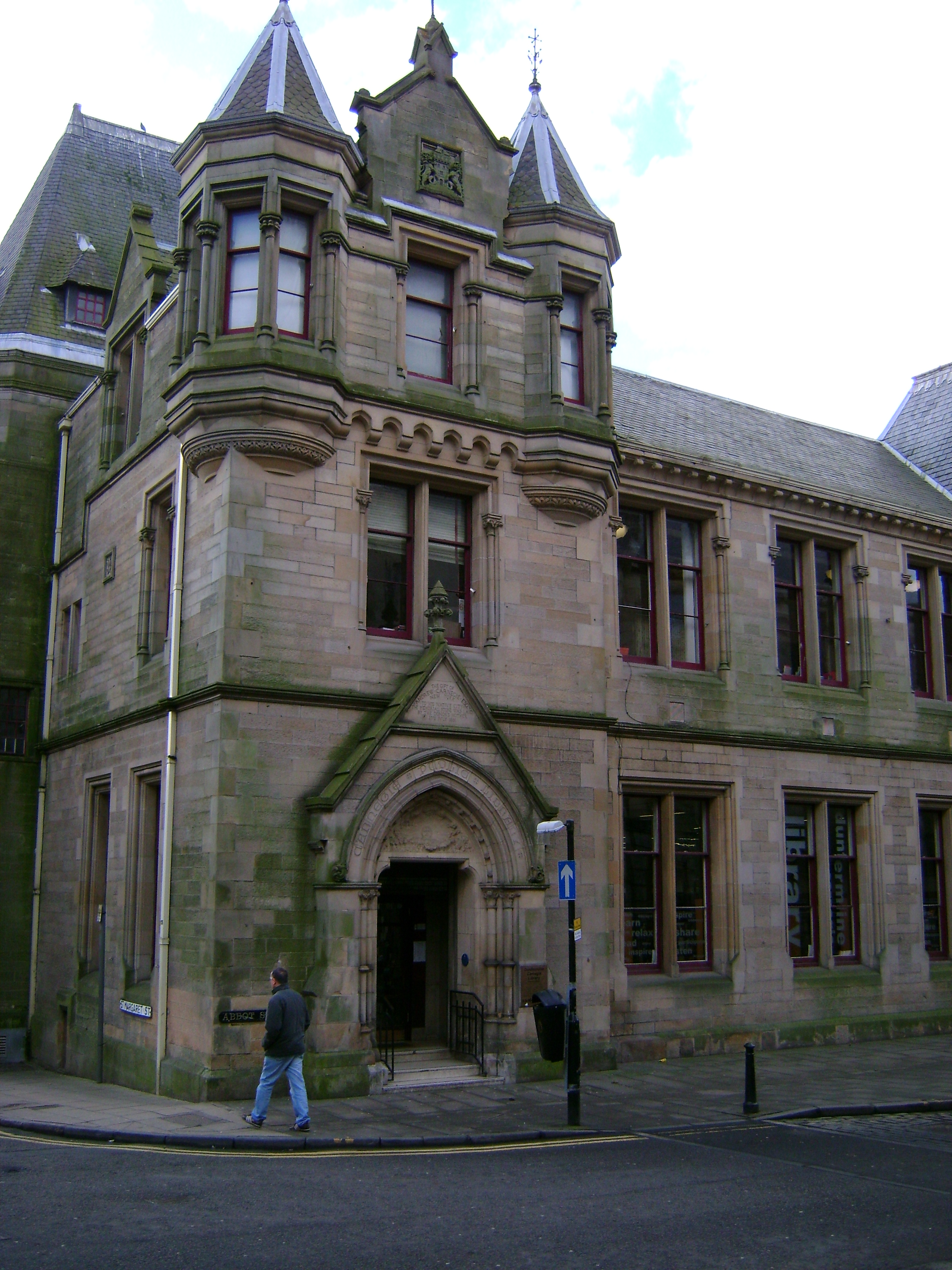
The first Carnegie library, in Dunfermline, Scotland

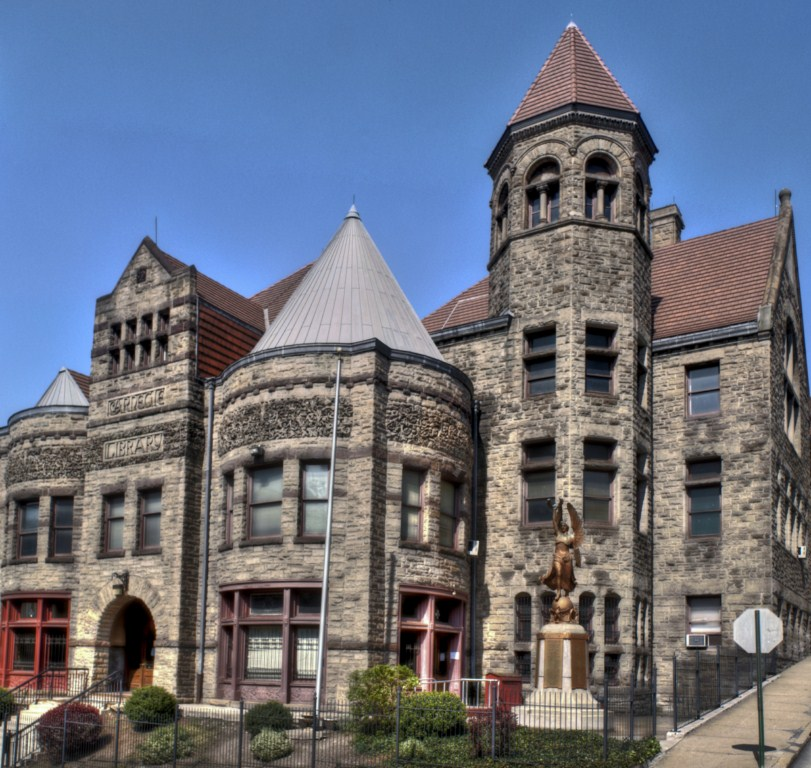
Carnegie Free Library of Braddock in Braddock, Pennsylvania, was the first Carnegie Library in the United States

Carnegie started erecting libraries in places with which he had personal associations. The first of Carnegie's public libraries, Dunfermline Carnegie Library, was in his birthplace, Dunfermline, Scotland. It was first commissioned or granted by Carnegie in 1880 to James Campbell Walker and would open in 1883.

The first library in the United States to be commissioned by Carnegie was in 1886 in his adopted home town of Allegheny, Pennsylvania (now the North Side of Pittsburgh). In 1890, it became the second of his libraries to open in the US. The building also contained the first Carnegie Music Hall in the world.

The first Carnegie library to open in the United States was in Braddock, Pennsylvania, about 9 miles up the Monongahela River from Pittsburgh. In 1889, it was also the site of one of the Carnegie Steel Company's mills. It was the second Carnegie Library in the United States to be commissioned, in 1887, and was the first of the four libraries which he fully endowed. An 1893 addition doubled the size of the building and included the third Carnegie Music Hall in the United States.

Nine of the first 13 U.S. libraries that Carnegie commissioned are in southwestern Pennsylvania. The Braddock, Homestead, and Duquesne libraries were owned not by municipalities, but by Carnegie Steel, which built them, maintained them, and delivered coal for their heating systems.

In 1897, Carnegie hired James Bertram as his personal assistant. Bertram was responsible for fielding requests from municipalities for funds and overseeing the dispensing of grants for libraries. When Bertram received a letter requesting a library, he sent the applicant a questionnaire inquiring about the town's population, whether it had any other libraries, how large its book collection was, and what its circulation figures were. If initial requirements were met, Bertram asked the amount the town was willing to pledge for the library's annual maintenance, whether a site was being provided, and the amount of money already available.

Until 1898, only one library was commissioned in the United States outside Southwestern Pennsylvania: a library in Fairfield, Iowa, commissioned in 1892. It was the first project in which Carnegie had funded a library to which he had no personal ties. The Fairfield project was part of a new funding model to be used by Carnegie (through Bertram) for thousands of additional libraries.

Beginning in 1899, Carnegie's foundation funded a dramatic increase in the number of libraries. This coincided with the rise of women's clubs in the post-Civil War period. They primarily took the lead in organizing local efforts to establish libraries, including long-term fundraising and lobbying within their communities to support operations and collections. They led the establishment of 75–80 percent of the libraries in communities across the country.

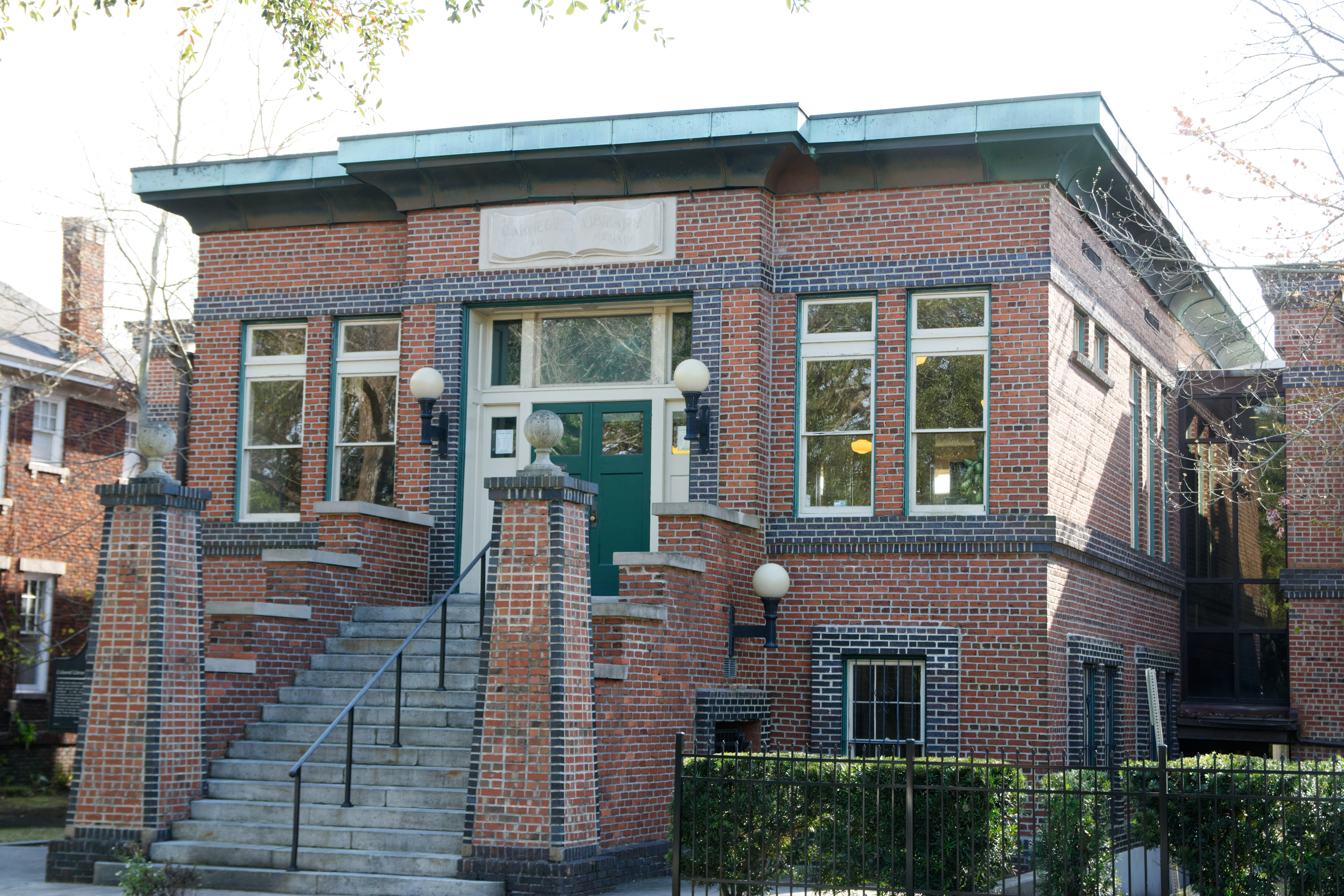
The Carnegie Library of Savannah, Georgia, U.S., known previously as the Carnegie Colored Public Library

Carnegie believed in giving to the "industrious and ambitious; not those who need everything done for them, but those who, being most anxious and able to help themselves, deserve and will be benefited by help from others." Under segregation, Black people were generally denied access to public libraries in the Southern United States. Rather than insisting on his libraries being racially integrated, Carnegie funded separate libraries for African Americans in the South. For example, in Houston he funded a separate Colored Carnegie Library. The Carnegie Library in Savannah, Georgia, opened in 1914 to serve Black residents, who had been excluded from the segregated White public library. The privately organized Colored Library Association of Savannah had raised money and collected books to establish a small Library for Colored Citizens. Having demonstrated their willingness to support a library, the group petitioned for and received funds from Carnegie. U.S. Supreme Court Justice Clarence Thomas wrote in his 2008 memoirs that he frequently used that library as a boy, before the public library system was desegregated.

The library buildings were constructed in a number of styles, including Beaux-Arts, Italian Renaissance, Baroque, Classical Revival, and Spanish Colonial, to enhance their appearance as public buildings. Scottish Baronial was one of the styles used for libraries in Carnegie's native Scotland. Each style was chosen by the community. As the years went by James Bertram, Carnegie's secretary, became less tolerant of approving designs that were not to his taste. Edward Lippincott Tilton, a friend often recommended by Bertram, designed many of the buildings.

The architecture was typically simple and formal, welcoming patrons through a prominent doorway, nearly always accessed via a staircase from the ground level. The entry staircase symbolized a person's elevation by learning. Similarly, most libraries had a lamp post or lantern installed near the entrance, meant as a symbol of enlightenment.

Carnegie's grants were very large for the era, and his library philanthropy was one of the most costly philanthropic activities, by value, in history. Carnegie continued funding new libraries until shortly before his death in 1919. Libraries were given to towns and cities in Great Britain and much of the English-speaking world: Almost $56.2 million went for construction of 2,509 libraries worldwide. Of that, $40 million was given for construction of 1,670 public library buildings in 1,412 American communities. Small towns received grants of $10,000 that enabled them to build large libraries that immediately were among the most significant town amenities in hundreds of communities.

== Background ==
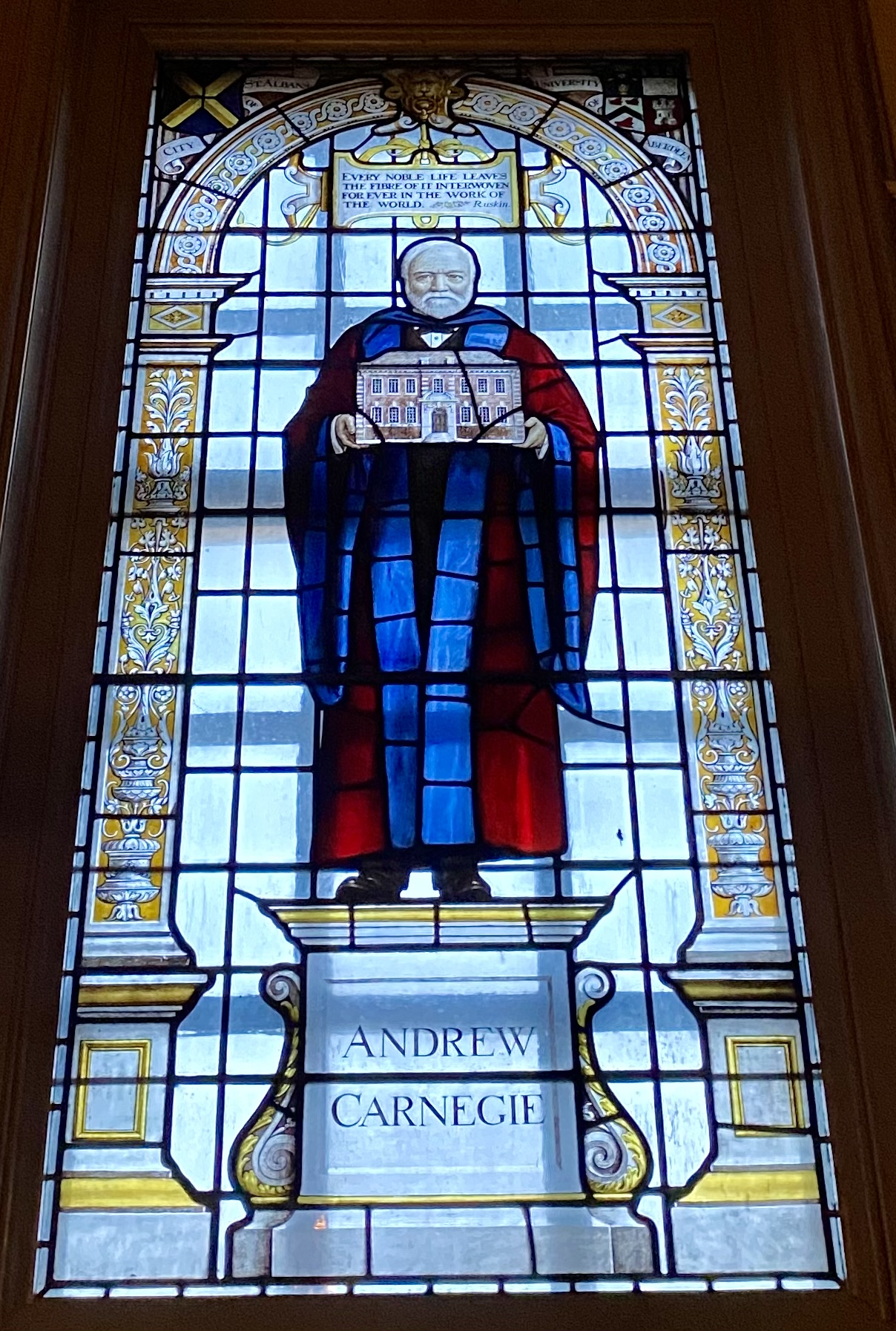
Stained-glass window of Andrew Carnegie at the former Carnegie Library, St Albans, Hertfordshire

Books and libraries were important to Carnegie, from his early childhood in Scotland and his teen years in Allegheny and Pittsburgh. There he listened to readings and discussions of books from the Tradesman's Subscription Library, which his father had helped create. Later in Pennsylvania, while working for the local telegraph company in Pittsburgh, Carnegie borrowed books from the personal library of Colonel James Anderson (1785-1861). He opened his collection to his workers every Saturday. Anderson, like Carnegie, resided in Allegheny.

In his autobiography, Carnegie credited Anderson with providing an opportunity for "working boys" (that some people said should not be "entitled to books") to acquire the knowledge to improve themselves. Carnegie's personal experience as an immigrant, who with help from others worked his way and became wealthy, reinforced his belief in a society based on merit, where anyone who worked hard could become successful. This conviction was a major element of his philosophy of giving in general. His libraries were the best-known expression of this philanthropic goal. In 1900, Carnegie granted funds to build the Anderson Memorial Library, in memory of Colonel John Byers Anderson, at the College of Emporia.

== Carnegie formula ==
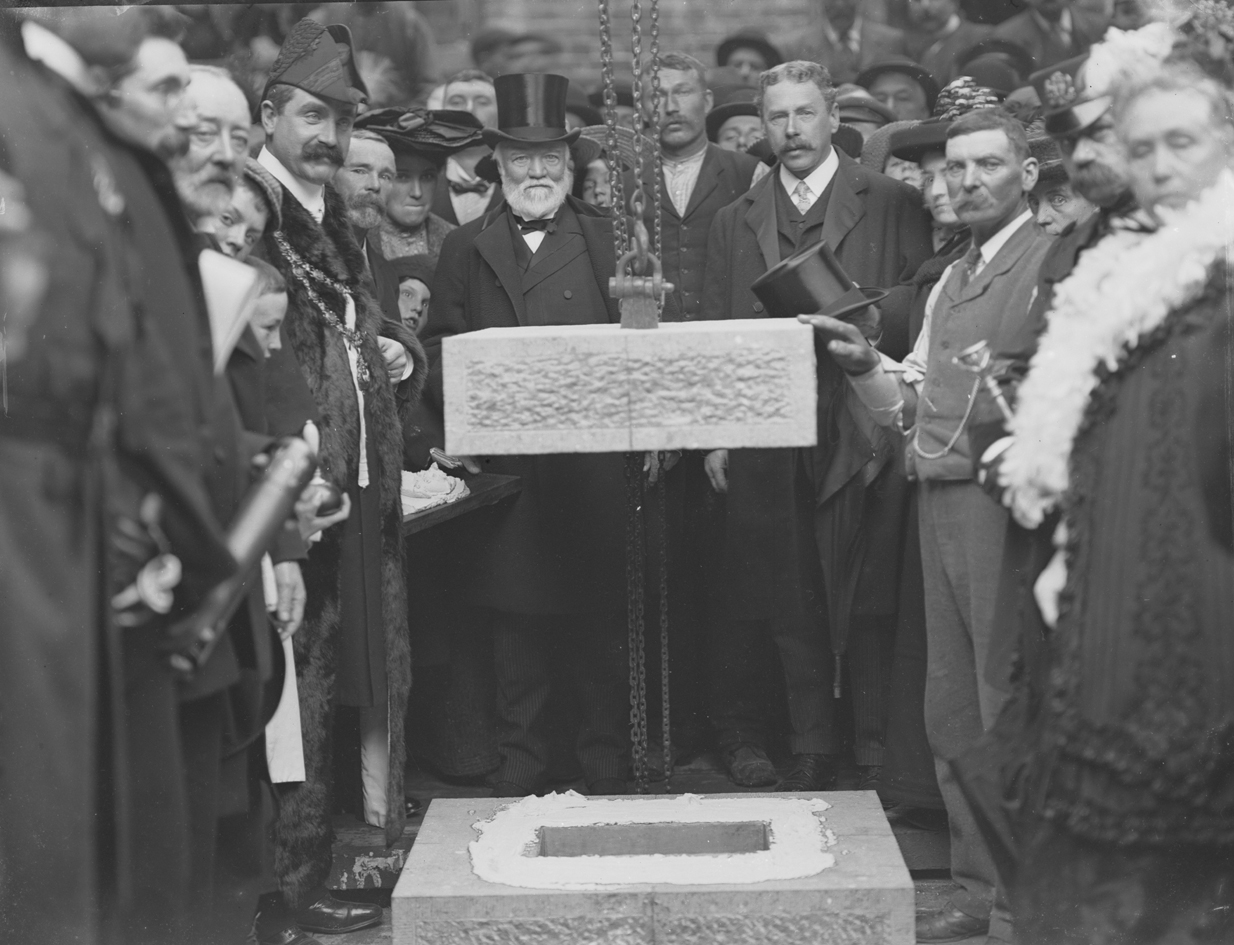
Carnegie laying the foundation stone of the Waterford City Library (1903)

Nearly all of Carnegie's libraries were built according to "the Carnegie formula", which required financial commitments for maintenance and operation from the town that received the donation. Carnegie required public support rather than making endowments because, as he wrote:

an endowed institution is liable to become the prey of a clique. The public ceases to take interest in it, or, rather, never acquires interest in it. The rule has been violated which requires the recipients to help themselves. Everything has been done for the community instead of its being only helped to help itself.

Carnegie required the elected officials—the local government—to:

- demonstrate the need for a public library;
- provide the building site;
- pay staff and maintain the library;
- draw from public funds to run the library—not use only private donations;
- annually provide ten percent of the cost of the library's construction to support its operation; and,
- provide free service to all.

Carnegie assigned the decisions to his assistant James Bertram. He created a "Schedule of Questions". The schedule included: Name, status and population of town, Does it have a library? Where is it located and is it public or private? How many books? Is a town-owned site available? Estimation of the community's population at this stage was done by local officials, and Bertram later commented that if the population counts he received were accurate, "the nation's population had mysteriously doubled".

The effects of Carnegie's library philanthropy coincided with a peak in new town development and library expansion in the US. By 1890, many states had begun to take an active role in organizing public libraries, and the new buildings filled a tremendous need. It was also a time of rapid development of institutions of higher learning. Interest in libraries was also heightened at a crucial time in their early development by Carnegie's high profile and his genuine belief in their importance.

In Canada in 1901, Carnegie offered more than $2.5 million to build 125 libraries. Most cities at first turned him down, then eventually took the money.

In 1902, Carnegie offered funds to build a library in Dunedin in New Zealand. Between 1908 and 1916, 18 Carnegie libraries were opened across New Zealand.

== Design ==
The Lawrenceville Branch of the Carnegie Library of Pittsburgh signaled a break from the Richardsonian style of libraries which was popularized in the mid 1800s. The ALA discouraged Richardsonian characteristics such as alcoved book halls with high shelves requiring a ladder, as well as sheltered galleries and niches, reminiscent of sixteenth-century Europe, largely because modern librarians could not supervise such spaces efficiently.

Bertram's architectural criteria included a lecture room, reading rooms for adults and children, a staff room, a centrally located librarian's desk, twelve-to-fifteen-foot ceilings, and large windows six to seven feet above the floor. No architectural style was recommended for the exterior, nor was it necessary to put Andrew Carnegie's name on the building. In the interests of efficiency, fireplaces were discouraged, since that wall space could be used to house more books.

There were no strict requirements about furniture, but most of it came from the Library Bureau, established by Melvil Dewey in 1888. It sold standardized chairs, tables, catalogs, and bookshelves.

== Self-service stacks ==
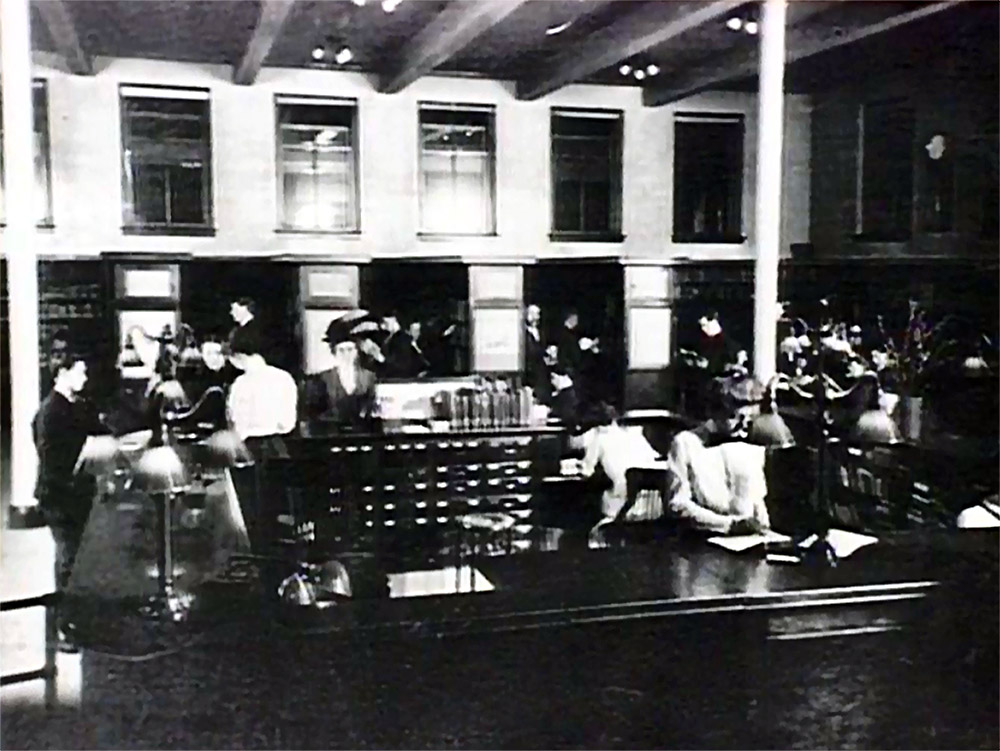
One of the first open shelf libraries: Pittsburgh's South Side branch, about the time it opened in 1910 and had a massive front desk

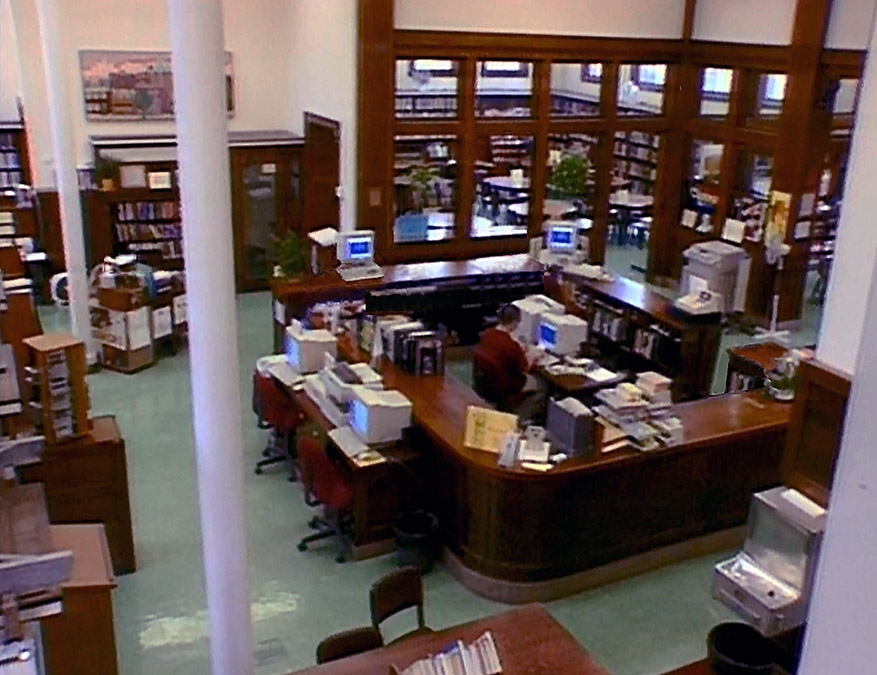
Original service desk at Pittsburgh (Pennsylvania) South Side branch in 1999. Originally designed to be imposing, it was replaced in 2011 by a side desk using original wood.

The first five Carnegie libraries followed a closed stacks policy, the method of operation common to libraries at that time. Patrons requested a book from a library staffer, who would fetch the book from closed stacks off limits to the public, and bring it to a delivery desk.

To reduce operating costs, Carnegie created a revolutionary open-shelf or self-service policy, beginning with the Pittsburgh neighborhood branches that opened after the main branch. This streamlined process allowed patrons to have open access to shelves. Carnegie's architects designed the Pittsburgh neighborhood branches so that one librarian could oversee each entire operation.

Theft of books and other items was a major concern. This concern resulted in the placement of the library's circulation desk—which replaced the delivery desk used in traditional closed stacks libraries—just inside the front door. Bigger and more daunting than those used in modern libraries, these desks spanned almost the width of the lobby and acted as a physical and psychological barrier between the front entrance and the book room.

The first of these "open stack" branches was in Lawrenceville, the sixth Carnegie library to open in America. The next was in the West End branch, the eighth Carnegie library in the US. Patricia Lowry describes

located just beyond the lobby, the circulation desk—no longer a delivery desk—took center stage in Lawrenceville, flanked by turnstiles that admitted readers to the open stacks one at a time, under the librarian's watchful eye. To thwart thievery, the stacks were arranged in a radial pattern. On each side of the lobby were a general reading room and, for the first time in a library anywhere, a room for children.... The reading rooms were separated by walls that became glass partitions above waist level—the better to see you with, my dear.

Walter E. Langsam, an architectural historian and teacher at the University of Cincinnati, wrote "The Carnegie libraries were important because they had open stacks which encouraged people to browse .... People could choose for themselves what books they wanted to read." This open stacks policy was later adopted by the libraries that previously had operated with closed stacks.

== Criticisms ==
The first secretary of the Iowa Library Commission, Alice S. Taylor, criticized the use of Carnegie funding for extravagant buildings rather than providing quality library services. Carnegie's funds covered only the library buildings themselves, and Carnegie gave library buildings to cities on the condition that the cities stocked and maintained them. As a result, small communities often struggled with maintenance costs associated with Carnegie libraries; towns were often happy to accept funding for new library buildings, but often unwilling to allocate taxes for upkeep. In fact, this was the most frequent complaint about Carnegie libraries in hindsight: gifting libraries to towns too small to support them actually slowed the development of cooperative regional libraries that those communities now rely on.

Some critics also saw his massive donations as insulting to communities that would be content to fund their own public works. Others saw his push for public libraries as merely an attempt at social control. Mark Twain, a supporter of Carnegie, claimed that Carnegie used philanthropy as a tool to buy fame. William Jewett Tucker criticized Carnegie's philanthropy from a religious viewpoint, arguing that it did not offset his "immoral" accumulation of wealth, and that his contributions did not justify the "evils" Tucker claimed existed in capitalism itself. Carnegie's own steel workers echoed this sentiment, arguing that his wealth would be better spent on improving working conditions for his own employees, rather than on library buildings across the country. Carnegie's response to those criticisms and the ensuing Homestead Steel Strike was telling of what he thought of his workers' concerns: "If I had raised your wages, you would have spent that money by buying a better cut of meat or more drink for your dinner. But what you needed, though you didn't know it, was my libraries and concert halls."

Carnegie's critics can be most efficiently summed up in the words of Finley Peter Dunne's parody of Carnegie himself: "Th' way to abolish poverty an' bust crime is to put up a brown-stone buildin' in ivry town in th' counthry." The idea that a building would be the panacea to cure all of society's ills, they argued, was simply not sustainable.

A further issue was the impact on pre-existing religious libraries that had promoted learning through free libraries for many years. A typical example is the United Presbyterian Library of Edinburgh, under Robert James Drummond which was affected following the opening of the Carnegie Library in the city centre.

In addition to the criticisms of his philanthropic interests and motivations, the construction of libraries in the American South was a highly contentious topic. State and local racial segregation laws across the South sought to bar African Americans access to public facilities, including libraries and when funding the construction of the Carnegie library in Atlanta in 1902, the proposed library, a segregated one, was fought by numerous activists of the period, including W. E. B. Du Bois. In the years following, as the American Library Association continued to ignore the systematic implementation of Jim Crow in the South, the Carnegie Corporation also continued to acquiesce to the social norms of the day and even required communities seeking grants to base their appropriations "only upon the White population of the towns."

== Continuing legacy ==
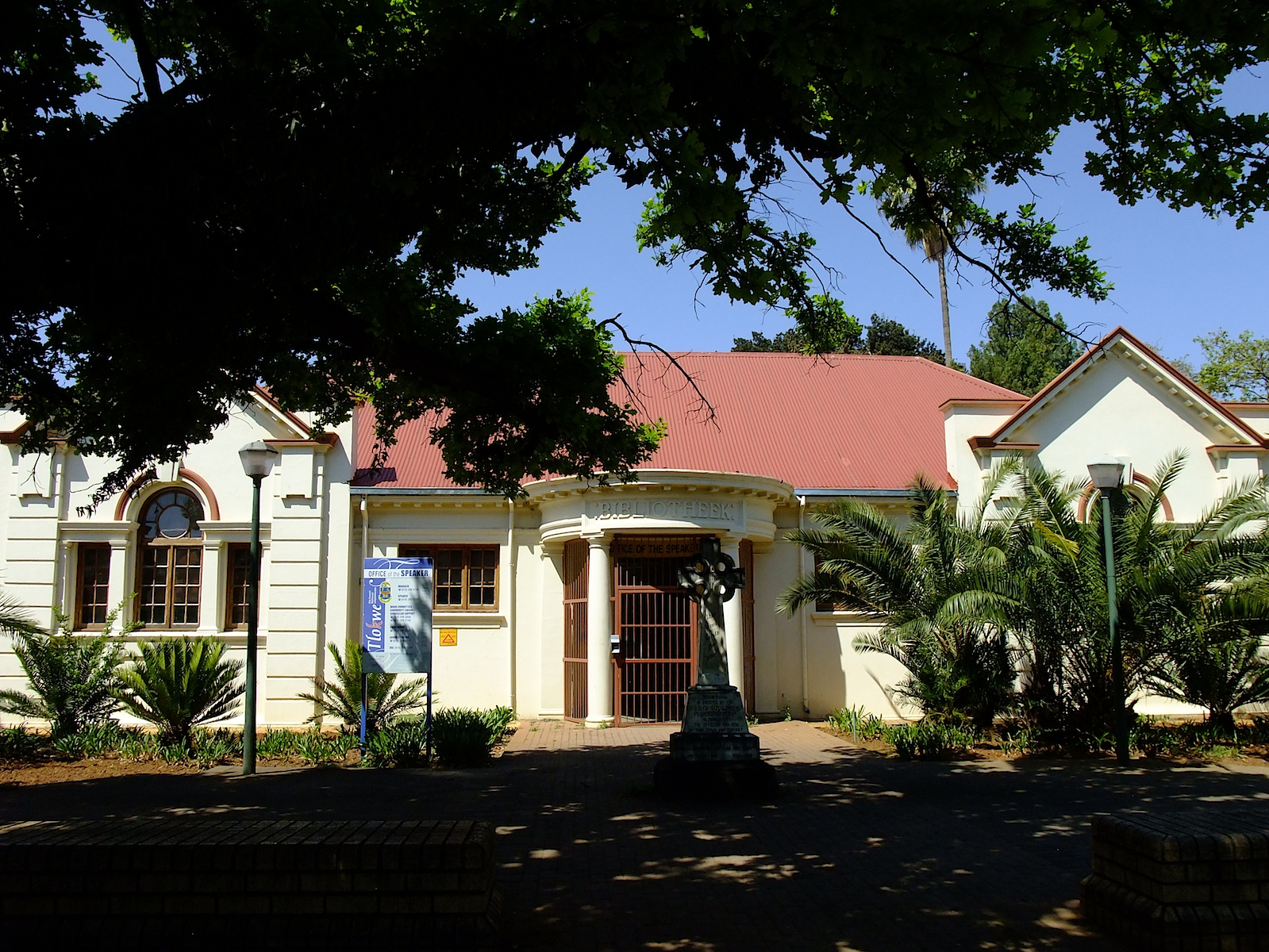
Carnegie Library in Potchefstroom, South Africa

Carnegie established charitable trusts which have continued his philanthropic work. But they had reduced their investment in libraries even before his death. There has continued to be support for library projects, for example in South Africa.

In 1992, The New York Times reported that, according to a survey conducted by George Bobinski, dean of the School of Information and Library Studies at the State University at Buffalo, 1,554 of the 1,681 original Carnegie library buildings in the United States still existed, and 911 were still used as libraries. He found that 276 were unchanged, 286 had been expanded, 175 had been remodeled, 243 had been demolished, and others had been converted to other uses.

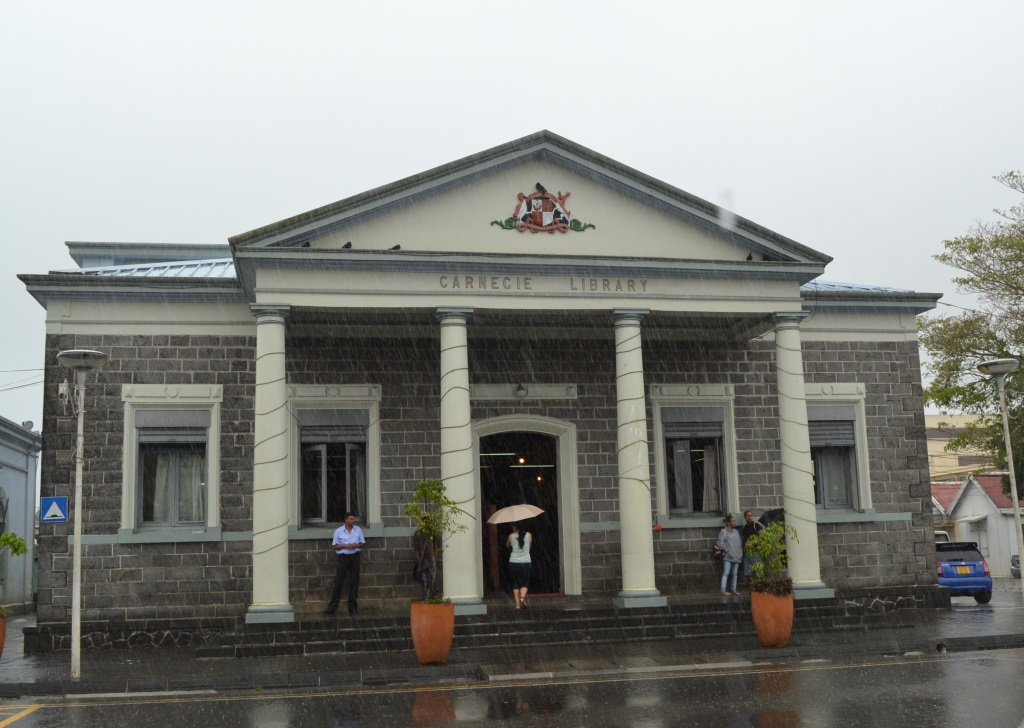
Carnegie Library in Curepipe, Mauritius. One of several Carnegie Libraries in Oceania

While hundreds of the library buildings have been adapted for use as museums, community centers, office buildings, residences, or other uses, more than half of those in the United States still serve their communities as libraries over a century after their construction. Many are located in what are now middle- to low-income neighborhoods. For example, Carnegie libraries still form the nucleus of the New York Public Library system in New York City, with 31 of the original 39 buildings still in operation; Carnegie Libraries operate in all 5 Boroughs of New York City across its three library systems. Also, the main library and eighteen branches of the Pittsburgh public library system are Carnegie libraries. The public library system there is named the Carnegie Library of Pittsburgh.

In the late 1940s, the Carnegie Corporation of New York arranged for microfilming of the correspondence files relating to Andrew Carnegie's gifts and grants to communities for the public libraries and church organs. They discarded the original materials. The microfilms are open for research as part of the Carnegie Corporation of New York Records collection, residing at Columbia University Rare Book and Manuscript Library. Archivists did not microfilm photographs and blueprints of the Carnegie Libraries. The number and nature of documents within the correspondence files varies widely. Such documents may include correspondence, completed applications and questionnaires, newspaper clippings, illustrations, and building dedication programs.

UK correspondence files relating to individual libraries have been preserved in Edinburgh (see the article List of Carnegie libraries in Europe).

Beginning in the 1930s during the Great Depression, some libraries were meticulously measured, documented and photographed under the Historic American Buildings Survey (HABS) program of the National Park Service. This was part of an effort to record and preserve significant buildings. Other documentation has been collected by local historical societies. In 1935, the centennial of Carnegie's birth, a copy of the portrait of him originally painted by F. Luis Mora was given to libraries which he had helped fund. Many of the Carnegie libraries in the United States, whatever their current uses, have been recognized by listing on the National Register of Historic Places. The first, the Carnegie Library in Braddock, Pennsylvania, was designated as a National Historic Landmark in March 2012.

"To this day, Carnegie's free-to-the-people libraries remain Pittsburgh's most significant cultural export, a gift that has shaped the minds and lives of millions."

— Architectural critic Patricia Lowry

== Gallery ==
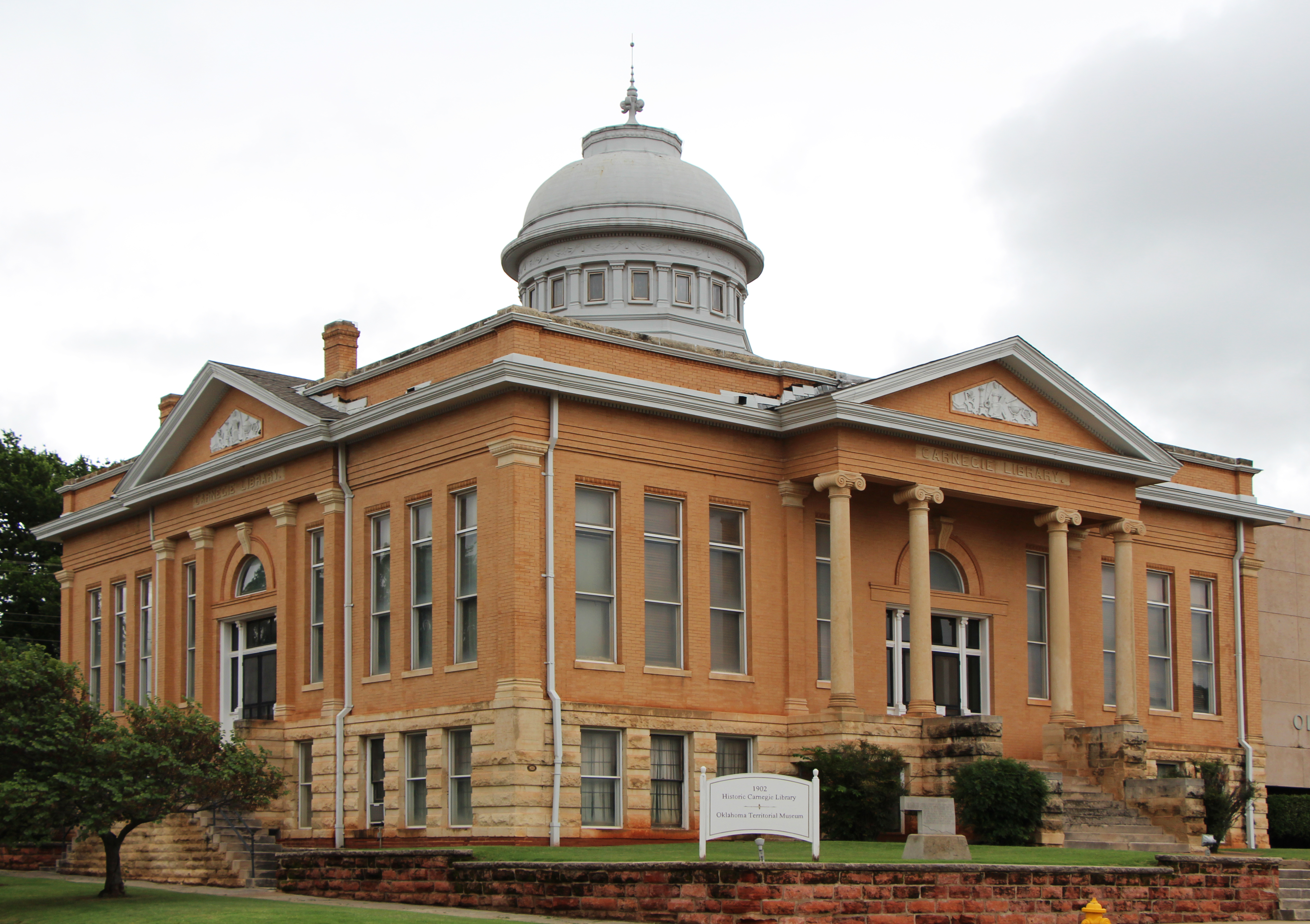
Carnegie Library, built in 1901 in Guthrie, Oklahoma

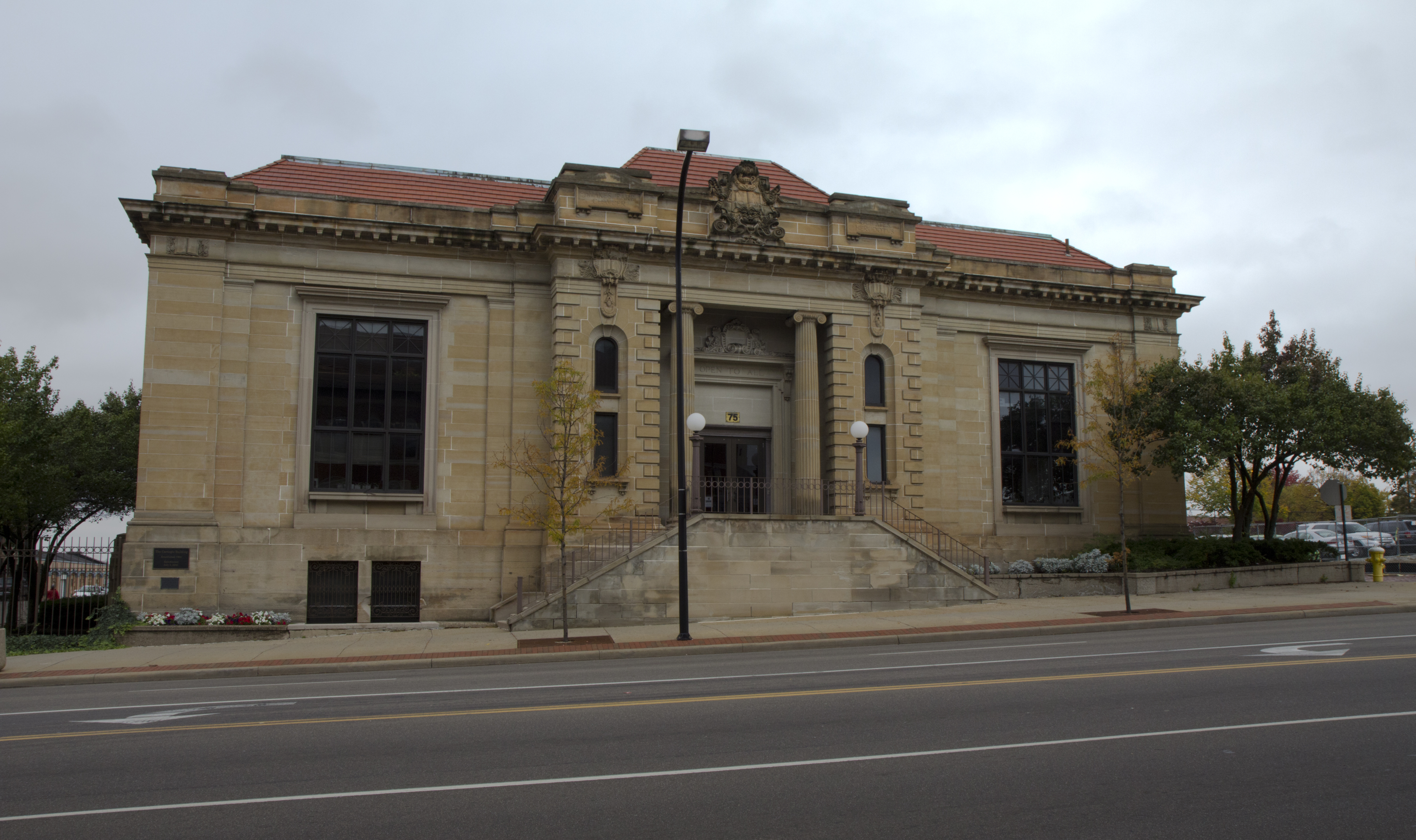
Carnegie Library, built in 1904 in Akron, Ohio

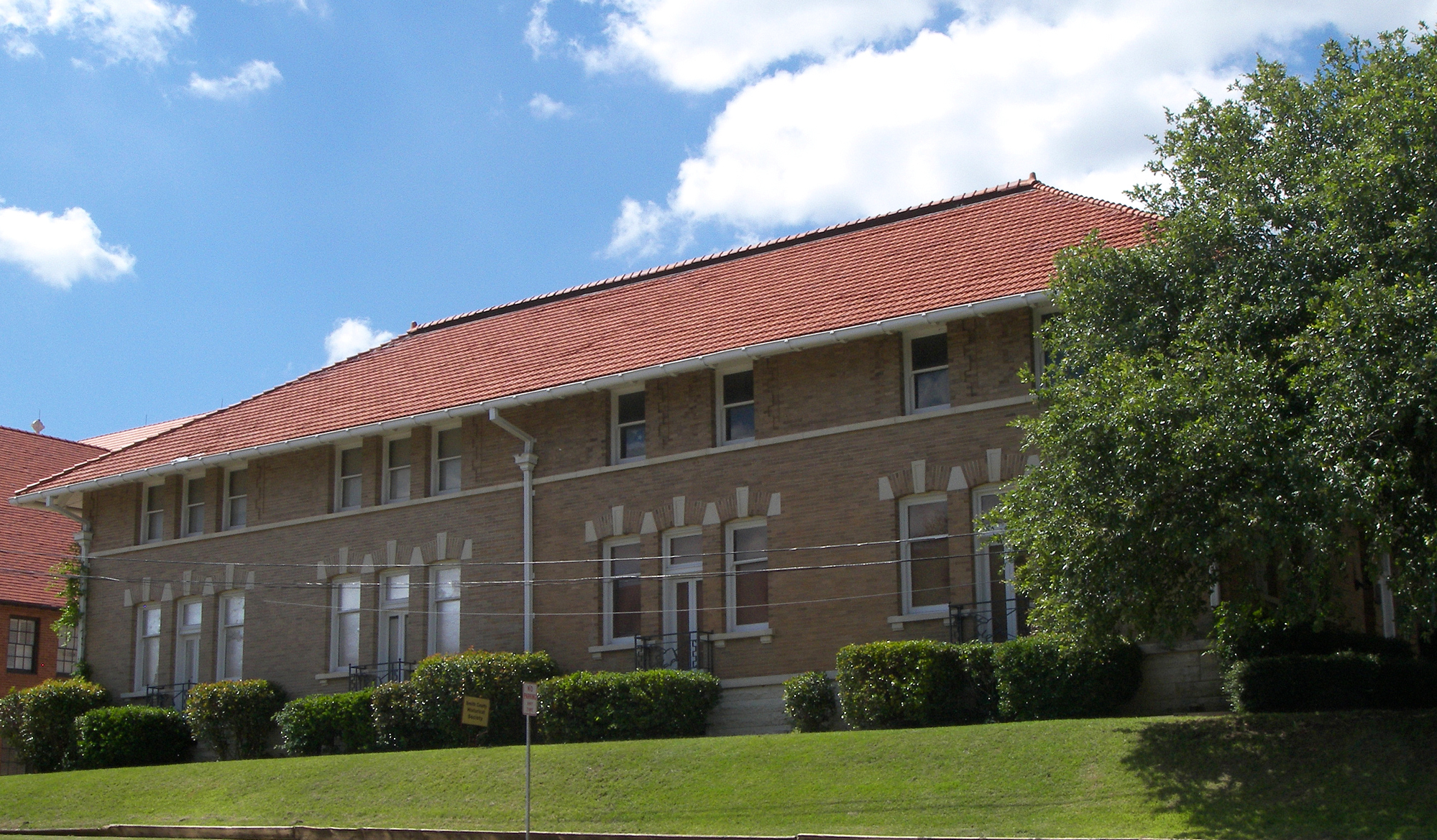
Carnegie Public Library, built in 1904 in Tyler, Texas

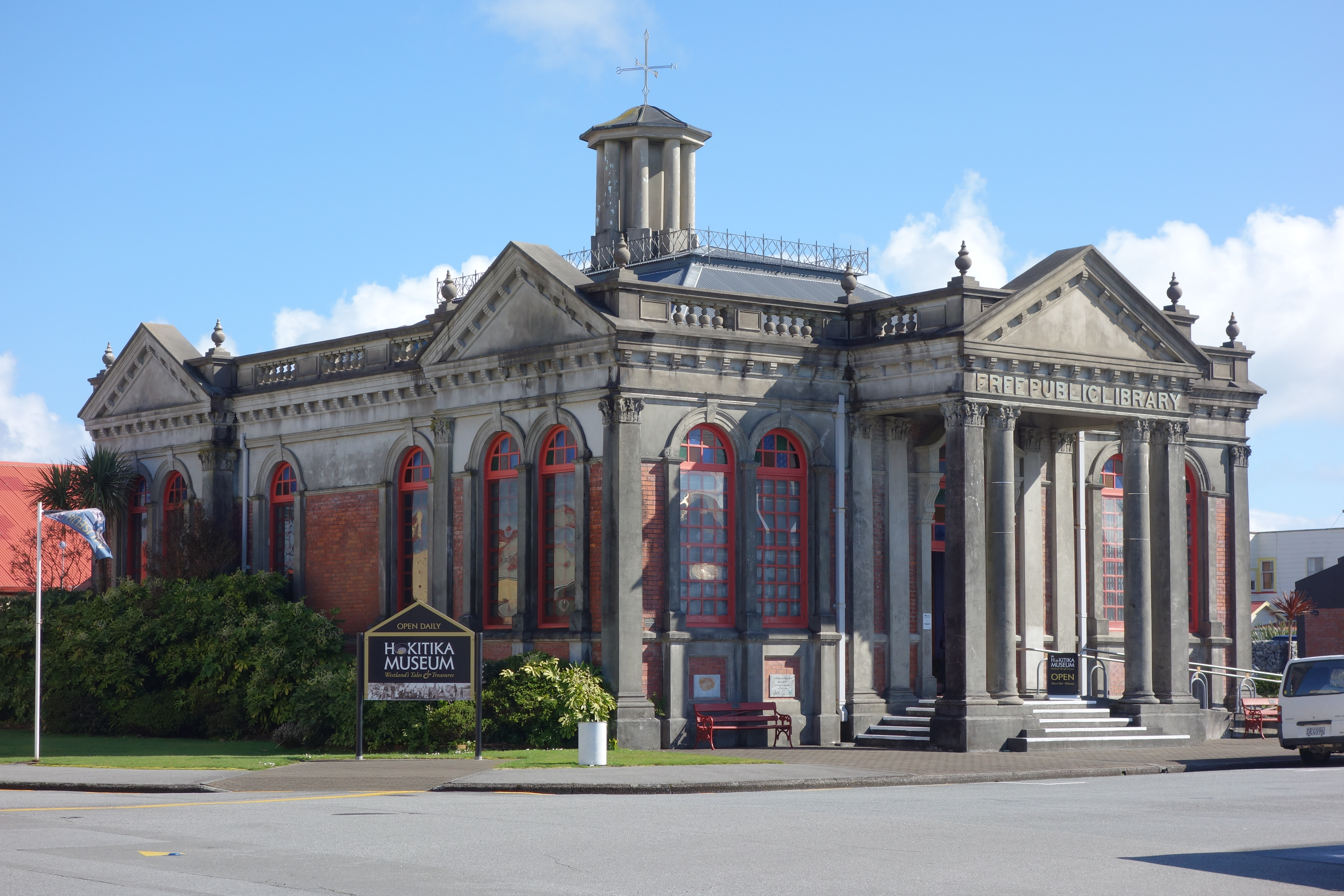
Carnegie Library, built in 1908 in Hokitika, New Zealand

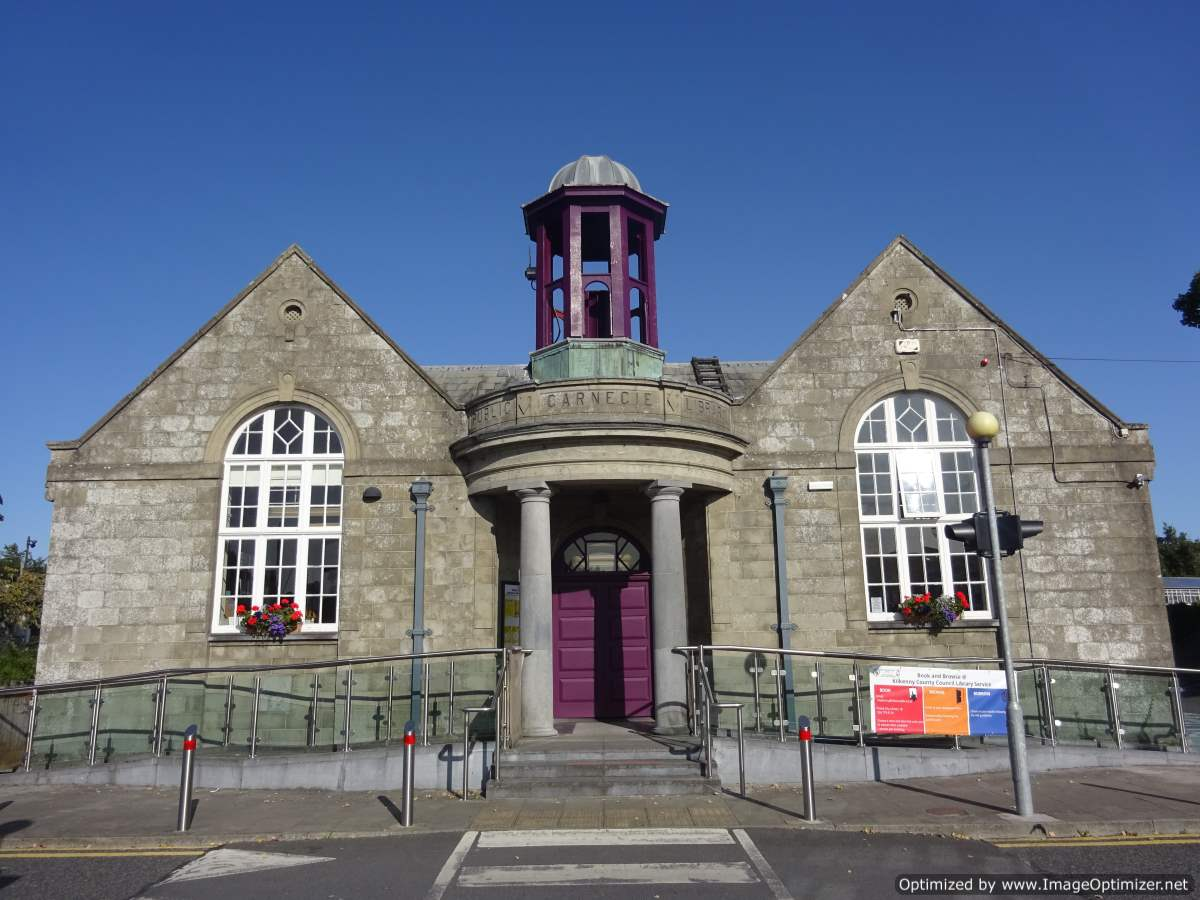
Kilkenny Carnegie Library, built in 1910 in Kilkenny, Ireland

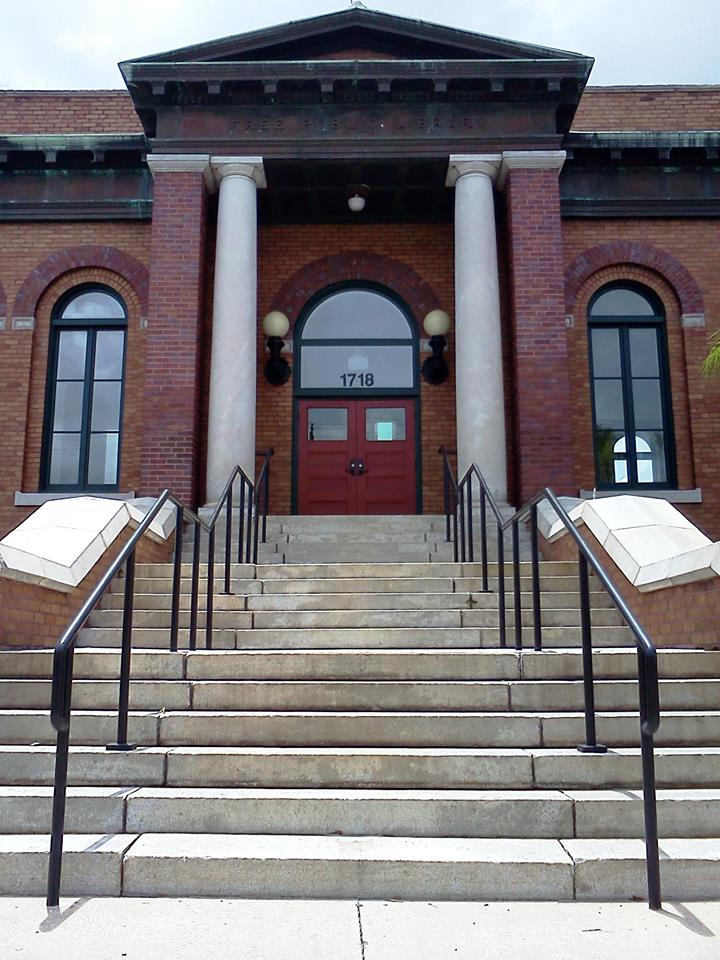
West Tampa Free Public Library, built in 1914 in Tampa, Florida

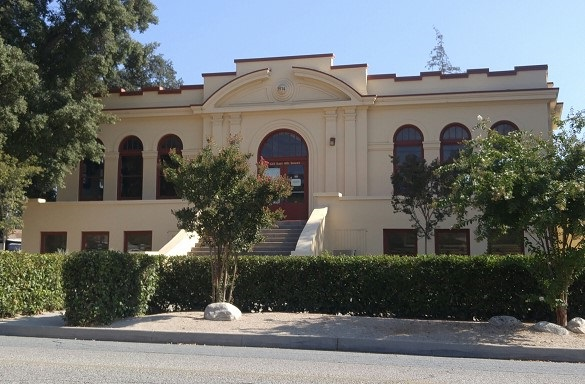
Beaumont Library built in 1914 in Beaumont, California

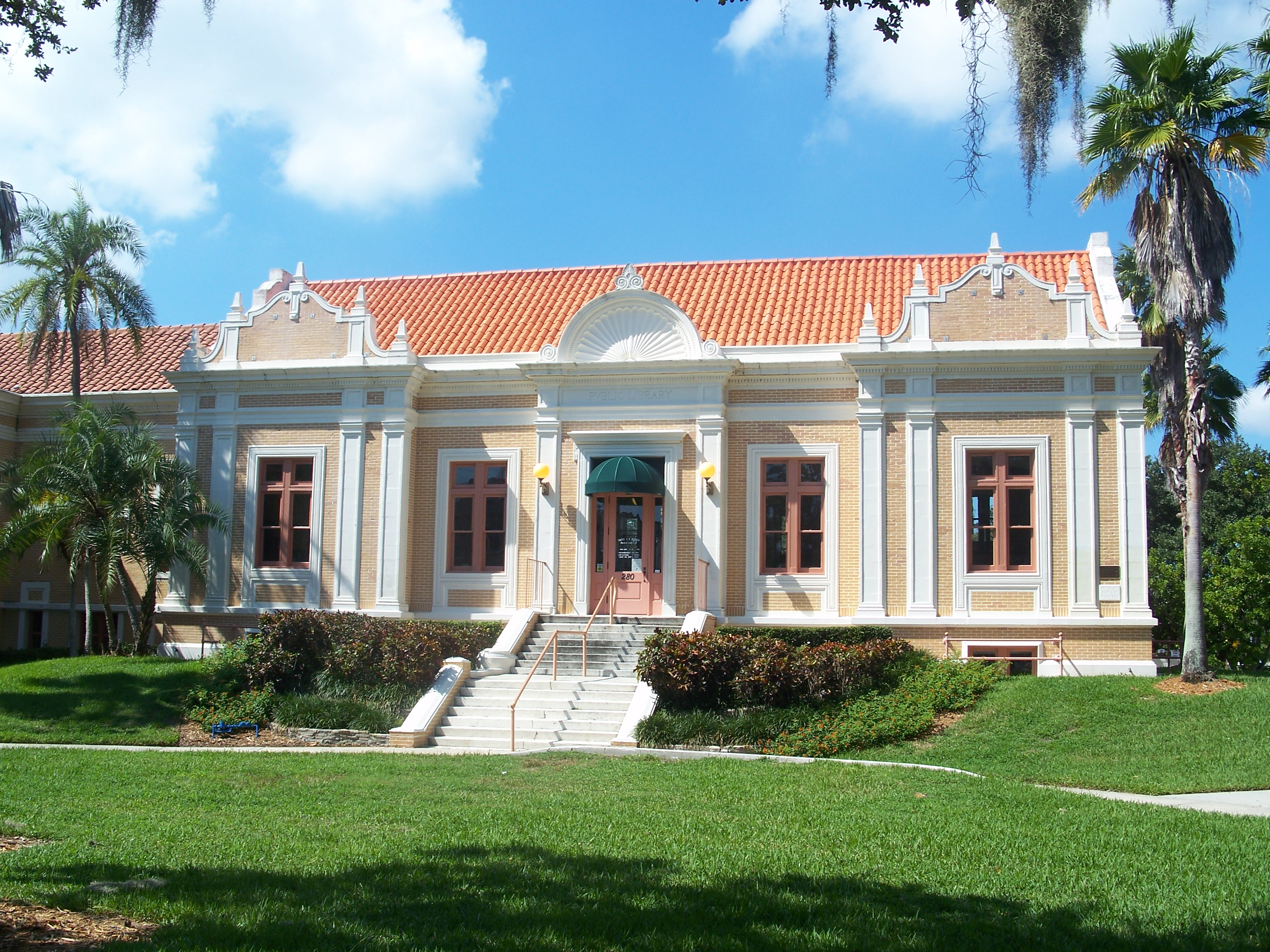
St. Petersburg Public Library, built in 1915 in St. Petersburg, Florida

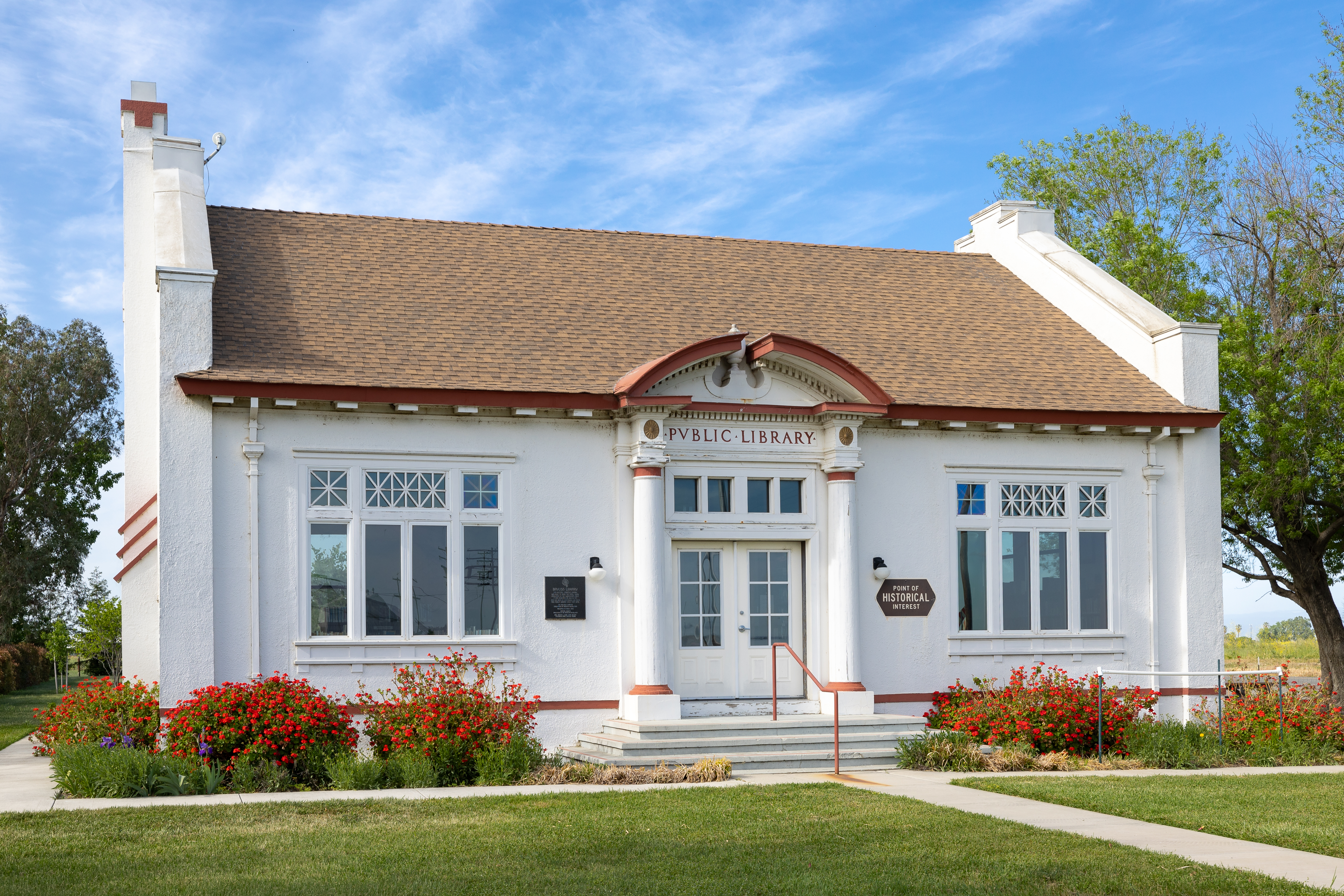
Bayliss Library, built in 1917 in Glenn County, California

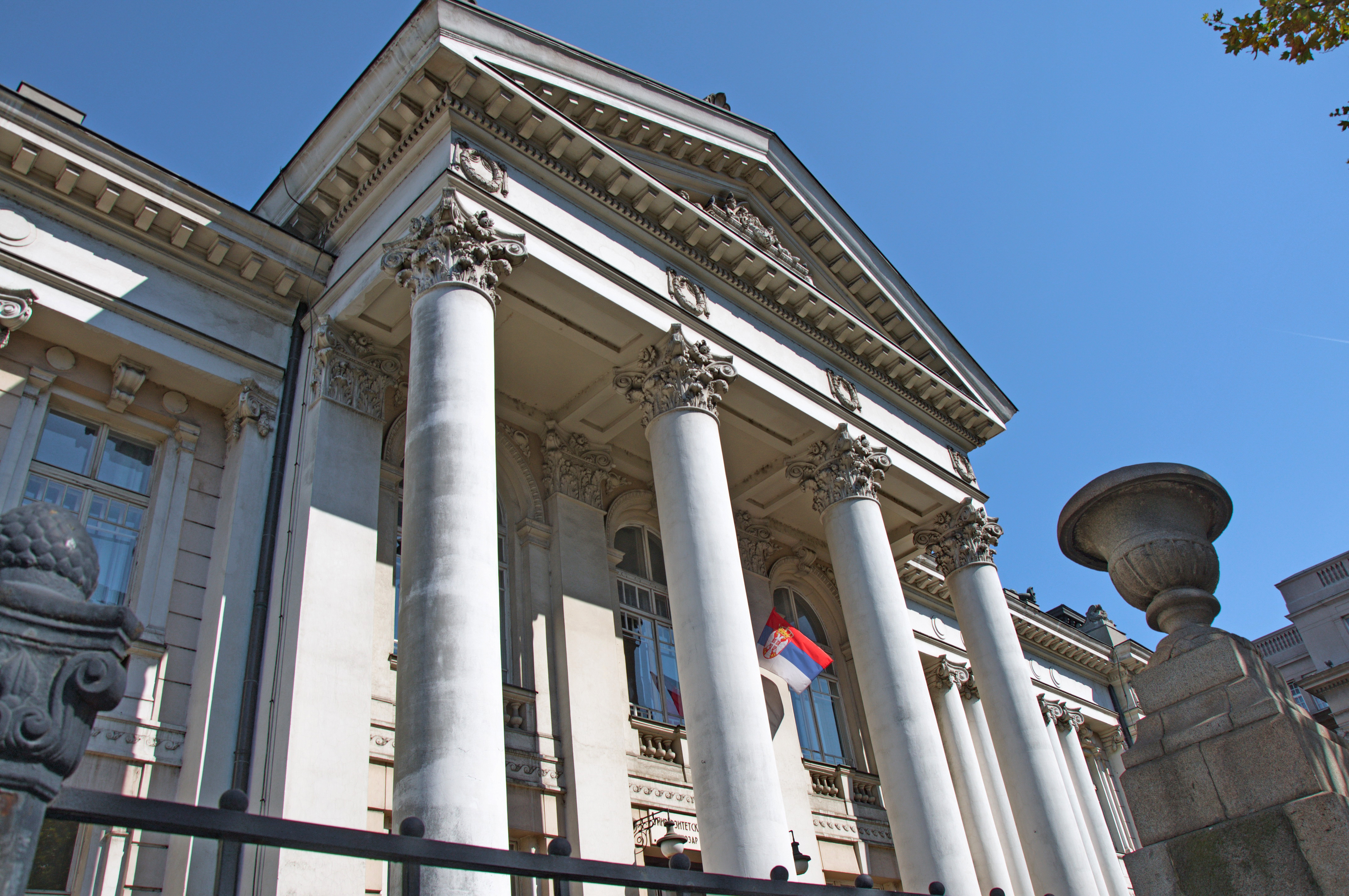
Carnegie Library, built in 1921 in Belgrade, Serbia

== Lists of Carnegie libraries ==
- List of Carnegie libraries in Africa
- List of Carnegie libraries in the Caribbean
- List of Carnegie libraries in Oceania
- List of Carnegie libraries in Canada
- List of Carnegie libraries in Europe
- List of Carnegie libraries in the United States
