= Amir Zaki =

Amir Zaki may refer to:

- Amir Zaki (artist) (born 1974), American artist
- Amr Zaki (born 1983), Egyptian footballer
- Aamir Zaki (1968–2017), Pakistani guitarist
