= List of Carnegie libraries in Oceania =

This is a list of Carnegie libraries in Oceania. Although most of Carnegie's philanthropic efforts were aimed at North America and Europe, a handful of libraries are scattered in other English-speaking areas of the world. New Zealand, with 18 Carnegie libraries, received the fourth-most libraries of any country.

== Australia ==
Carnegie financed four libraries in Australia.

	City or locality	State	Image	Date granted	Grant amount	Inflation adjusted amount	Location	Notes
1	Hobart	Tasmania		6 Oct 1902	$36,505	$1,358,407	16 Argyle Street	Now the Maritime Museum of Tasmania.
2	Midland Junction	Western Australia		2 Dec 1909	$7,300	$261,583		
3	Mildura	Victoria		23 Jun 1906	$9,825	$352,062		
4	Northcote	Victoria		13 Mar 1909	$14,610	$523,525		
Total	—	—	—	—	$68,240	$2,445,267	—	—

== Fiji ==
There is a Carnegie library in Suva, Fiji's capital, funded by the philanthropist with a $7,300 grant ($252,241 today) on 13 December 1907.

== Malaysia ==
There was a Carnegie library in Kota Bharu.

== New Zealand ==
The money for Carnegie libraries in the Dominions (the contemporary term used for former colonies such as Australia, New Zealand and South Africa within the British Empire) was administered from New York. Twenty-five towns and boroughs applied for funding and eighteen libraries were provided in New Zealand. The country had the fourth-highest number of Carnegie libraries, behind the USA, the UK and Canada:

	Town	Region	Image	Date granted	Grant amount	Location	Notes
1	Alexandra	Otago		2 Dec 1909	$3,880		Demolished in 1978
2	Balclutha	Otago		2 Apr 1913	$4,870	23 John Street	
3	Cambridge	Waikato		14 Dec 1908	$4,870		
4	Dannevirke	Manawatū-Whanganui		10 Apr 1906	$9,690		Threatened by demolition as of May 2023
5	Dunedin	Otago		19 Sep 1902	$48,700	Moray Place	Dunedin Public Library moved to a new building in 1981.
6	Fairlie	Canterbury		31 Jan 1913	$4,875	6 Allandale Road	Library moved in mid 1990's to Mackenzie College
7	Gore	Southland		10 Jul 1907	$9,750	14 Hokonui Drive	Eastern Southland Gallery
8	Greymouth	West Coast		5 Oct 1904	$10,967		Destroyed by arson in 1947
9	Hamilton	Waikato		23 Apr 1906	$9,720	354 Victoria Street	Opened 27 February 1908; demolished in 1960
10	Hastings	Hawke's Bay		29 May 1905	$12,175		Opened in 1907; demolished in 1931
11	Hokitika	West Coast		20 Jun 1905	$12,175	17 Hamilton Street	Hokitika Museum
12	Levin	Manawatū-Whanganui		28 Sep 1909	$7,290		Demolished in 1965
13	Marton	Manawatū-Whanganui		23 Jul 1914	$6,075		
14	New Plymouth	Taranaki		13 Feb 1906	$12,150		Demolished in 1957
15	Onehunga	Auckland		15 Jul 1909	$9,720	55 Princes Street	Library moved to a new building in 1970; this building is now a pub
16	Thames	Waikato		7 Jan 1904	$9,760		In 2014 the library was restored and extended to provide archive and genealogy facilities for the Thames Coromandel area
17	Timaru	Canterbury		14 Jun 1906	$21,010	2 King George Place	Built in 1908, now the facade for the Timaru City District Council offices, library relocated in 1979.
18	Westport	West Coast		10 Sep 1903	$9,720	Lyndhurst Street	The library moved to a new building in 2003
Total	—	—	—	—	$207,397	—	—
