= List of Carnegie libraries in Africa =

This is a list of Carnegie libraries in Africa. Although most of Carnegie's philanthropic efforts were aimed at North America and Europe, a handful of libraries are scattered in other English-speaking areas of the world.

The vast majority of the Carnegie libraries in Africa were concentrated in South Africa. The Carnegie Corporation of New York continues to fund library investments in nearly a dozen countries in Africa to this day; however, no buildings have been granted since 1917.

	Community	Country	Image	Date granted	Grant amount	Location	Notes
1	Curepipe	Mauritius		Feb 26, 1914	$8,765		
2	Victoria	Seychelles		Aug 6, 1907	$9,740		
3	Barberton	South Africa		Dec 22, 1911	$4,385		
4	Benoni	South Africa		Dec 8, 1913	$13,330		
5	Germiston	South Africa		Mar 16, 1915	$26,470		Currently used as a restaurant
6	Harrismith	South Africa		Nov 14, 1907	$9,825		
7	Hopetown	South Africa		Mar 21, 1908	$4,850		
8	Krugersdorp	South Africa		May 3, 1917	$15,840		
9	Moorreesburg	South Africa		Aug 21, 1911	$7,290	On Church Street, between the Dutch Reformed Church and Townhall.	Currently used as a tourist information bureau for visitors to the town.
10	Muizenberg	South Africa		Jun 25, 1909	$7,800	186 Main Road, Muizenberg 7945	Became a police station, now a police museum
11	Newcastle	South Africa		Dec 8, 1913	$7,290		
12	Potchefstroom	South Africa		Apr 30, 1912	$12,175		
13	Standerton	South Africa		Dec 22, 1911	$7,300		
14	Vryheid	South Africa		Oct 15, 1906	$7,300		
Total	—	—	—	—	$142,360	—	—
