= Beaumont Library District =

Public library and special district in Riverside County, California

- Beaumont Library
- 33.932°N 116.981°W
- Location: Beaumont, California, United States
- Established: 1911

Access and use
- Population served: 67,000

Other information
- Director: Kelly Van Valkenburg
- Website: mybld.org

Beaumont Library District is a California special district in western Riverside County, which provides public library services to the city of Beaumont and unincorporated portions of the county, including Cherry Valley. Its service area encompasses 60 square miles (160 km^{2}) with a population of approximately 67,000. Beaumont Library is located at 125 East Eighth Street.

== History ==
The district itself was established by a public vote on August 12, 1911, a full year before Beaumont was incorporated as a city and just two months prior to the approval of voting rights for women in the state. The library issue passed by a margin of 59 to 27, whereas the suffrage initiative on October 12 passed by a much narrower margin, 71-67.

Mural of early Beaumont, by Henri De Kruif, 1936.

The date of the first meeting of the Library Board of Trustees was August 30, 1911 with Chester McNeil presiding. Mrs. C. J. Miner was appointed as the first librarian in September 1911.

A collection of books was already in existence due to the efforts of the Beaumont Woman's Club, which had started a subscription library in 1909. The old library association disbanded when the new library opened to the public in two rooms of the Beaumont Bank building, at the corner of Fifth and Grace, on October 1, 1911. A $10,000 grant was received from Andrew Carnegie in 1913 to build a permanent building. Construction of the new Carnegie library was begun in January 1914 and the facility was opened in June 1914.

Beaumont Library is one of the few public libraries where, during the 1930s, artists employed through the federal Works Progress Administration created murals which remain in excellent condition today. It is also the last Carnegie library remaining in Riverside County.

An extension to the Carnegie structure was added in 1965, more than doubling the library’s square footage. Through funding from the local Laura May Stewart Foundation, the “Laura May Stewart” community room was added in 1981.

== Governance ==
Beaumont Library District is one of just twelve special "library services" districts in the state of California and is independent of both city and county government. It has been governed by a five-member Board of Trustees since 1966 when it was expanded from the original number of three. Board members are elected volunteers who serve four-year terms without pay to administer the library services district.

Beaumont Library is a member of the Inland Library System, a cooperative of nineteen libraries in Inyo, Riverside, and San Bernardino counties, that share programs and resources.
