= Amir Zaki (artist) =

American artist

- Born: August 27, 1974; Beaumont, California, US
- Education: University of California, Los Angeles, University of California, Riverside
- Known for: Photography, video
- Website: Amir Zaki

Amir Zaki (born 1974, Beaumont, California) is an American artist based in Southern California. He is best known for "hybridized" photographs using digital and analog technologies that explore the rhetoric of authenticity, vocabulary of documentary, and acts of looking and constructing images. His work often focuses on the iconography and landscape of Southern California, simultaneously celebrating the banal and vernacular and subverting its related mythology. Zaki has exhibited nationally and internationally, and been featured in shows at the Whitney Museum of American Art, Orange County Museum of Art (California Biennial, 2006), California Museum of Photography, and San Jose Museum of Art. His work is held in the public collections of the Los Angeles County Museum of Art, Hammer Museum, New Museum, and Whitney Museum, among many, and appears in the anthologies Vitamin Ph (2006), Photography is Magic (by Charlotte Cotton, 2015) and Both Sides of Sunset: Photographing Los Angeles (2015).

Amir Zaki, Untitled (OH_04X), Ultrachrome archival photograph, 70” x 89”, 2004. Whitney Museum of American Art collection.

Zaki's art has been featured in Artforum, Flash Art, Art in America, ARTnews, the Los Angeles Times, The New York Times, and The Seattle Times, among many publications. New York Times critic Martha Schwendener described his early images of domestic architecture as "graphic and abstract, with meaning hovering at the edge of the frame, they read like metonyms for Los Angeles itself." Zaki's monographs include: Building + Becoming (2022), California Concrete: A Landscape of Skateparks, with essays by Tony Hawk and Peter Zellner (2019), Eleven Minus One (2010), and VLHV (2003). He is Professor of Photography and Digital Technology in the Art Department at University of California, Riverside.

== Life and career ==
Zaki was born in Beaumont, California in 1974 and attended the University of California Riverside (UCR), where he double-majored in art and philosophy (BA, 1996) and studied photography with John Divola and Uta Barth. He did graduate work with James Welling at the University of California, Los Angeles (UCLA), earning an MFA in 1999. Upon graduating, he actively exhibited locally (Los Angeles Municipal Art Gallery, Santa Barbara Museum of Art and Los Angeles Contemporary Exhibitions) and nationally (New Museum and Whitney Museum). Since 2000, he has had solo shows at the Mak Center at the Schindler House and the ACME, Roberts and Tilton, and Edward Cella galleries (Los Angeles), Perry Rubenstein Gallery (New York), and James Harris Gallery (Seattle), among others. In 2005, the architecture magazine Domus commissioned him to photograph the new Herzog and de Meuron extension of the Walker Art Center and published his work on its cover and in a special feature. In 2018, Zaki was one of ten international photographers invited by the Dalian Modern Museum in China to create work for the exhibit, "Eye of the World: Shots of Dalian," and was also featured in a survey exhibition there.

Zaki has taught in the Art Department of at UCR since 1999. In 2002, he was appointed Professor of Photography and Digital Technology. He is also a certified yoga instructor and teaches free yoga and tai chi courses at UCR. In 2011, he started Infinity Strap, a business based around two products for which he holds patents, a figure-eight-shaped yoga strap and a specially shaped yoga block.

== Work ==
Zaki emerged amid photography's transition to digital technologies; his "hybridized photographs"—made from multiple images, using both analog and digital technologies—build on recent conceptual and historical photographic traditions. Zaki captures ubiquitous, eclectic Southern California iconography, often in a flat, documentary style that maintains an initial sense of veracity, which he disrupts by limiting references of scale, perspective, spatial logic and context or making digital alterations. He often works in distinct but interrelated series that play off one another conceptually and formally to explore various dualities: photographic authenticity and digital manipulation, function and dysfunctionality, the real and imaginary, two-dimensional surface and three-dimensional form. Reviewers frequently note that despite Zaki's conceptual focus, his work also conveys strong formalist and sensual concerns. He works in two primary veins: built landscape series and "natural" landscape series.

=== Built landscape series ===
Amir Zaki, Concrete Vessel 55, photograph, 60" x 75", 2019. "Empty Vessel" series.

Zaki's early "Photographs From" (1999) and "Various Recordings" (2001) series feature long-exposure images of depopulated Los Angeles night scenes whose rooftop vantage points call attention to the act of looking and suggest portent. Presented in tight, unconventional vertical formats that flatten and abstract the space, the images contain small, intensified bursts of color highlighting spare signs of life and mysterious, digitally excised absences. Critics described them as disconcerting, anticipatory moments "like held breaths" that conjured Edward Hopper and science fiction noir. Zaki's "Valley Lake Hollywood Village" works (2003) take banal suburban homes and unnaturally squeeze them into turret-, castle- or spire-like forms placed in believable surroundings to startling effect. The later "A Question Marks the Spot" series (2007), engages semiology, with straight-on images of post-war strip mall architecture in which Zaki replaced identifying signage with a cryptic, invented iconography of symbols, squiggles, and emblems. Critic Martha Schwendener described them as "razor-sharp, formalist photographs that ripple with noirish undercurrents" and extend the Los Angeles street photography tradition associated with Ed Ruscha.

Zaki gained widespread attention for his "Spring Through Winter" series (2005). It comprised three suites of photographs: large-scale images of single-story, modernist hillside homes; pools shot from dizzying heights and abstracted into geometric shapes suggesting post-apocalyptic remnants rather than icons of luxury and fun; and mysteriously bricked-over, tomb-like fireplaces. Focused on vernacular domestic architecture, the series both amplified and undermined its associations with solidity, rootedness and Southern California affluence through disorienting angles and perspectives, claustrophobic compositions and selective subtractions and additions. In hillside home images such as Untitled (OH_04X) (2004), Zaki shot from dramatic, low angles and digitally removed support beams, rendering the cantilevered structures impossibly perched on the verge of collapse or launch into space. Critic Peter Frank described them as "absurd, but thrilling and menacing"; others identified them as "heady, unsettling image[s] of impending doom" that played on Southern California's unstable landscape and mythology of living on the edge.

Zaki's move to the Orange County beachside turned his attention to lifeguard huts in the "Relics" series (2010). Here, he also shot from below, eliminating contextualizing clues (sand, water) to starkly isolate the towers against the sky, then digitally stripped away functional elements (ladders and ramps) before re-pairing the towers with different skies to create off-key color and lighting effects. Art in America likened the "seamless and quite beautiful" monumental photographs to the work of Florian Maier-Aichen and Beate Gütschow. Other reviews described the transformed images, such as Untitled (Tower 19X), as "an imaginary lost modernism," "marooned spaceships," and uncanny portraits of alien sculptures suspended mid-air.

In 2019, after photographing the brutalist architecture of twelve empty California skateparks for two years, Zaki presented the monograph, California Concrete: A Landscape of Skateparks (with essays by Tony Hawk and Peter Zellner), and the exhibition, "Empty Vessel," which paired the skate park images with visually parallel pictures of broken ceramic objects. He produced the skatepark images using a hyper-detailed, multi-image, compositing technical process that exaggerates spatial depth and temporality, rendering the already-otherworldly sites more contradictory and alien; reviewers compared their worn, sculptural monumentality to landscape sites such as Yosemite's Half Dome, and suggested that the juxtaposition alongside the broken ceramics transformed both image sets into spaces of contemplation and potentiality.

Amir Zaki, Coastline Cliffside_08, Ultrachrome archival photograph. 30" x 36", 2012. "Time Moves Still" series.

=== "Natural" landscape series ===
Zaki's other primary body of work focuses on the growing "natural" landscape. Critic Christopher Michno, noting a tension between formalist notions of timeless beauty and digital photography's potential unreliability, suggests this work is less "a depiction of photographic subjects [than] a discourse about the language of photographic production, the act of looking and how we construct images." Zaki's 2007 series, "At What Point Is the Wax No Longer Wax?" (referencing Descartes's wax argument on contingency), presents dark, velvety black-and-white photographs of isolated trees, stumps, and severed limbs placed prop-like on lawns and urban scenes set against black backdrops. Theatrically lit, and digitally altered, the constructed images beckon to California modernists Wynn Bullock and Edward Weston, yet render the familiar alien, leading reviewers to regard Zaki's formalism as commentary pointing beyond the photographic to "a deeper form of truth in artifice."

Amir Zaki, Rock #29, Ultrachrome archival photograph. 65" x 60", 2016. "Formal Matter" series.

The "Time Moves Still" works (2011–3) explore instability, pliability and resistance, pairing images of "discordant amalgamations of geology, civil engineering, and residential construction" lining cliffsides with studies of "hobbled though strangely beguiling urban trees." The cliff series (e.g., Coastline Cliffside_08, 2012) uses long exposures that harken to early photography, compositing dozens of sequenced image-captures into seemingly instantaneous photographs that nonetheless yield clues to their extended temporality. Los Angeles Times critic Holly Myers called them "stately, often elegant photographs" that uncover "the peculiar, the precarious, the buoyant, and the beautiful" in structures often overlooked.

Zaki's "Seeking Clarity" (2015) and "Formal Matter" (2017) series pair works that take dichotomous analog or digital paths to abstraction, the blurring of perception, or "truth." "Seeking Clarity" juxtaposes immersive, tightly cropped and digitally compacted images of the turbulent ocean waves with close-up images of palm tree seed pods shot as isolated sculptural forms. In the ocean images, Zaki seamlessly merged photographs to create disorienting, horizon-line-free images of blue, green and foaming white waves crisscrossing and exploding at impossible, gravity-defying angles; in their abstraction, they evoke forms ranging from the microscopic to rock, obsidian, or fur. In contrast, the seed pod images rely on the nuanced capturing of texture and illumination rather than manipulation to achieve their suggestiveness.

Amir Zaki, Carving #12, Ultrachrome archival photograph. 60" x 75", 2016. "Formal Matter" series.

In "Formal Matter," Zaki's encompassing "Rocks" suite (e.g., Rock #29) depicts dramatically silhouetted, coastal outcroppings that Zaki isolates against grey skies, imbuing them with both the grandeur and monumentality of large abstract sculptures and a sense of the fantastical or suspect, which itself is troubled by the abundance of surface detail. The "Carvings" works (e.g., Carving #12) stretch believability further, isolating what appear to be gnarled, meticulously carved wood forms resembling waves, seed pods, or shells, that are actually flat planks, photographed and digitally manipulated. Critics suggested the work of these series recalled, and perhaps reflected ironic takes on, the work of Bernd Becher and Hilla Becher, Karl Blossfeldt, Imogen Cunningham, Carleton Watkins, and Edward Weston. Zaki's subsequent "Getting Lost" series (2018) features hyper-resolution prints of trees set against night-black backdrops that digitally intertwine two trees in intimate pairings, sometimes with startling color effects.

== Collections and recognition ==
Zaki's work belongs to public and private collections across the country including those of the J. Paul Getty Museum, Whitney Museum, New Museum, Los Angeles County Museum of Art, Hammer Museum, San Francisco Museum of Art, Madison Museum, Orange County Museum of Art, Santa Barbara Museum of Art, Henry Art Gallery, and Nevada Museum of Art. He has also been recognized with a Foundation for Contemporary Arts grant (2010) and a James D. Phelan Art Award in Photography (2005).
