= Beaumont, California =

City in the United States

- City
- Beaumont Library in Beaumont

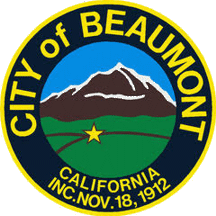
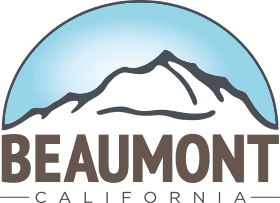
- Seal Logo
- Interactive map of Beaumont, California
- Location of Beaumont in California Beaumont (California) Beaumont (the United States) Beaumont (North America)
- Coordinates: 33°55′46″N 116°58′38″W
- Country: United States
- State: California
- County: Riverside
- Incorporated: November 18, 1912

Government
  - Type: Council-Manager
  - Mayor: Mike Lara
  - Mayor Pro Tem: Jessica Voigt
  - City Council: Lloyd White; David Fenn; Julio Martinez III

Area
  - Total: 30.33 sq mi (78.56 km^{2})
  - Land: 30.32 sq mi (78.52 km^{2})
  - Water: 0.015 sq mi (0.04 km^{2}) 0.04%
- Elevation: 2,612 ft (796 m)

Population (2020)
  - Total: 53,036
  - Density: 1,749.4/sq mi (675.43/km^{2})
- Time zone: UTC−8 (PST)
  - Summer (DST): UTC−7 (PDT)
- ZIP Code: 92223
- Area code: 951
- FIPS code: 06-04758
- GNIS feature IDs: 1660318, 2409805
- Website: beaumontca.gov

Beaumont is a city in the Inland Empire region of Riverside County, California, United States. The city is located on the eastern edge of the Greater Los Angeles area at the summit of the San Gorgonio Pass.

As of the 2020 census, Beaumont had a population of 53,036.

== History ==
=== Etymology ===
Beaumont, which is French for "Beautiful Mountain", received its name in 1887 from Henry C. Sigler, president of the Southern California Investment Company, because San Jacinto Peak is nearby and visible from the city.

=== Early history ===
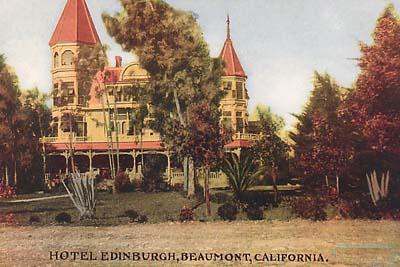
A postcard of an early Beaumont luxury hotel and surrounding plant life

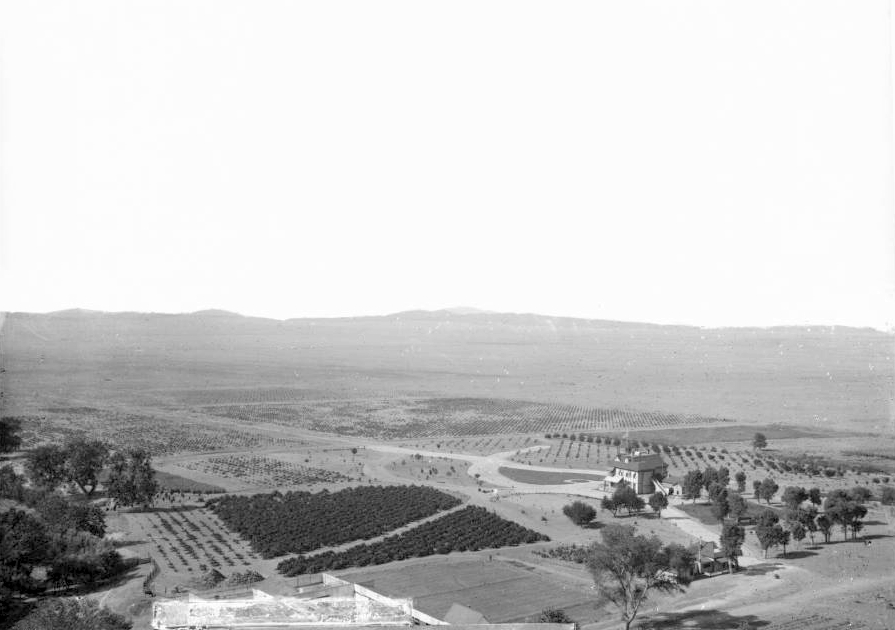
The Smith Ranch in Beaumont, purchased in 1884, a large three-story house that served as the Highland Home Hotel

The earliest inhabitants were Native Americans.

During the early 1850s, several surveying parties passed through the vicinity of present-day Beaumont in search of a pass that would connect the east to the Pacific Ocean. The San Gorgonio Pass was first surveyed in 1853 during an expedition under Lieutenant R.S. Williamson, who was sent by the United States government. Its location enthralled many who now saw that connecting to the ocean was a feasible measure and led to plans for constructing a railway from the Missouri River to the Pacific. By the early 1860s, stagecoach lines were providing service through the pass area, and a stage stop was established, named Edgar Station, after a physician from one of the expedition parties who made his home in the area.

In 1875 when the Southern Pacific Railroad laid tracks through the modern-day location of Beaumont, they established a rail station named Summit Station. This served as a rest stop for railway travelers from the Mojave Desert on their way to the Los Angeles vicinity. In 1884 a real estate development company established a town named San Gorgonio. A second real estate development company purchased the town in 1887 and renamed the town Beaumont, which was incorporated on November 18, 1912.

By 1927, the small city had a population of 857 with five churches, a public library, a bank, a high school, two local newspapers, several lumber yards, commercial packing houses, and a dehydrating plant. The city, one of Riverside County's largest apple growers, was dubbed "the land of the big red apple" by local residents in its early years. Apple orchards in the area expanded to a $200,000 industry by 1930. Beaumont saw a rise in visitors and residents as the nearby city of Palm Springs grew to become a highly popular resort spot during and after the 1930s; Beaumont followed suit and attempted to capitalize on the increasing tourism by establishing guest ranches. According to an early 1930s/1940s postcard, the Highland Springs Guest Ranch of Beaumont offered its patrons horseback riding, tennis, archery, horseshoes, swimming, shuffle-board, ping pong, baseball, ballroom dancing, massages, basketball, and lodging accommodations.

=== 20th century growth ===
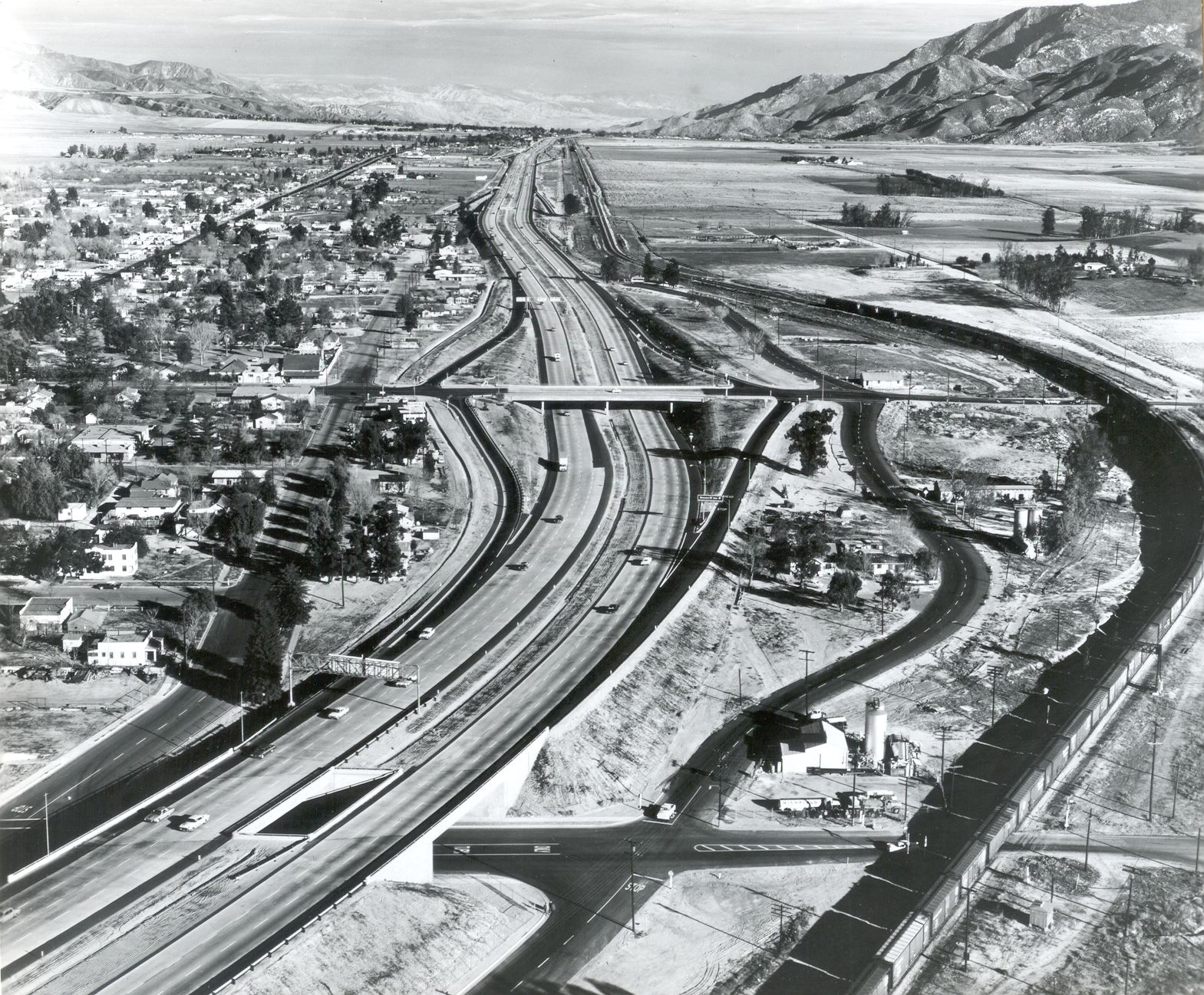
Interstate 10 in Beaumont, 1963

During the Cold War, a Lockheed rocket test site operated by Simi Valley–based Rocketdyne was established south of the town in Potrero Canyon. In late 2003, the majority of the Potrero Canyon site was sold to the state of California. Toxic chemicals used in rocket fuel and site test activities have been found in the soil and groundwater at the site, and planning is underway to begin cleanup sometime in the next few years. Plans are being developed by the California Department of Fish and Game to allow public access.

With the housing boom in the early decade, the urban sprawl reached the last remaining valleys of the Inland Empire. Since 2000, with Beaumont's proximity to Los Angeles, various Southern California residents have moved to the San Gorgonio Pass region for its low housing cost, causing a 20% jump in the city's population, making it the fastest growing city in the state. This has concerned many local residents who cite increasing student population in schools, rising demand on the water supply, and increasing traffic through the city on Interstate 10 in both directions. A 2008 study by the Public Policy Institute of California noted that Beaumont and its neighboring communities in the nearby San Jacinto Valley have registered the highest population growth throughout Riverside County and that the region was projected to increase by 4.5% a year to 310,000 by 2015.

Beaumont is home to many master-planned communities. The following communities are currently under construction or have been built: Oak Valley Greens, Three Rings Ranch, Solera by Del Webb (later sold to Pulte Homes Inc.), Olivewood by Taylor Morrison, Sundance and Tournament Hills by Pardee Homes, Four Seasons by K. Hovnanian and Fairway Canyon. Except for Oak Valley Greens and Three Rings Ranch, these communities operate under HOAs and are similar to developments in Redlands, Rancho Cucamonga, and some Orange County suburbs.

=== Corruption allegations ===
In May 2016, prosecutors announced that they were charging almost all of Beaumont's former government leadership with corruption they said had been going on for three decades. Seven former officials were arrested and charged with stealing nearly $43 million from city coffers. Former City Manager Alan Kapanicas, former Economic Development Director David William Dillon, former Public Works Director Deepak Moorjani, former Planning Director Ernest Alois Egger, former Finance Director William Kevin Aylward, former City Atty. Joseph Sandy Aklufi and former Police Chief Francis Dennis Coe Jr. were accused of using their public offices to enrich themselves personally and secure interest-free loans for friends and colleagues with taxpayer money. Bail for Kapanicas, Aylward, Aklufi, Dillon, Moorjani and Egger was set at $5 million each, while Coe's bail was set at $100,000. The criminal probe began in April 2015 when investigators with the Riverside County district attorney's office and the FBI raided City Hall and seized records, computers and other items. All seven defendants pleaded guilty to offenses in plea bargains during 2017–2018.

== Geography ==
Beaumont's neighboring cities are Banning to the east and Calimesa to the northwest.

With an elevation of 2,500 to 3,000 feet (760 to 910 m) above sea level, Beaumont is at the peak on the San Gorgonio Pass between San Bernardino and Palm Springs, neighboring the Interstate 10 and State Route 60 freeways. If driving east to Banning or west to Calimesa, drivers can feel a gradual downward slope.

According to the United States Census Bureau, the city has a total area of 30.9 square miles (80 km^{2}), of which 99.96% is land and 0.04% is water.

=== Climate ===
Beaumont reaches an average high of 95 °F (35 °C) during the summer and an average low of 38 °F (3 °C) during the winter. Due to its higher elevation, it is usually 5 °F (3 °C)-10 °F (6 °C) colder than its neighboring lower-elevation cities, such as Moreno Valley, Hemet, San Jacinto, and the Palm Springs desert area. Snow does fall, but it usually doesn't stick for more than a couple of hours. According to the Köppen Climate Classification system, Beaumont has a Hot-summer Mediterranean climate, abbreviated "Csa" on climate maps.

Beaumont's slightly cooler temperatures and less air pollution, relative to its neighboring lower-elevation cities, make it a desirable area for development in the Inland Empire region. However, it is one of the windiest cities in Southern California, along with San Bernardino, Fontana, and Victorville.

Annual precipitation is approximately 19.28 inches (489.8 mm).

Climate data for Beaumont, California, 1981–2010 normals, extremes 1939–2010
Month	Jan	Feb	Mar	Apr	May	Jun	Jul	Aug	Sep	Oct	Nov	Dec	Year
Record high °F (°C)	83 (28)	88 (31)	95 (35)	100 (38)	111 (44)	109 (43)	114 (46)	113 (45)	112 (44)	106 (41)	94 (34)	86 (30)	114 (46)
Mean daily maximum °F (°C)	63.1 (17.3)	64.5 (18.1)	68.6 (20.3)	74.3 (23.5)	80.9 (27.2)	89.4 (31.9)	96.3 (35.7)	96.8 (36.0)	91.5 (33.1)	81.2 (27.3)	70.8 (21.6)	62.6 (17.0)	78.3 (25.8)
Daily mean °F (°C)	51.9 (11.1)	52.6 (11.4)	55.2 (12.9)	59.4 (15.2)	65.5 (18.6)	71.9 (22.2)	78.3 (25.7)	78.7 (25.9)	74.2 (23.4)	65.6 (18.7)	57.6 (14.2)	51.2 (10.7)	63.5 (17.5)
Mean daily minimum °F (°C)	40.6 (4.8)	40.7 (4.8)	41.7 (5.4)	44.5 (6.9)	50.1 (10.1)	54.4 (12.4)	60.2 (15.7)	60.6 (15.9)	56.9 (13.8)	50.0 (10.0)	44.4 (6.9)	39.7 (4.3)	48.7 (9.3)
Record low °F (°C)	11 (−12)	19 (−7)	21 (−6)	25 (−4)	31 (−1)	35 (2)	42 (6)	38 (3)	37 (3)	29 (−2)	20 (−7)	20 (−7)	11 (−12)
Average precipitation inches (mm)	3.91 (99)	4.29 (109)	3.09 (78)	1.19 (30)	0.65 (17)	0.17 (4.3)	0.35 (8.9)	0.26 (6.6)	0.49 (12)	1.03 (26)	1.57 (40)	2.33 (59)	19.33 (489.8)
Average snowfall inches (cm)	0.0 (0.0)	0.7 (1.8)	trace	0.0 (0.0)	0.0 (0.0)	0.0 (0.0)	0.0 (0.0)	0.0 (0.0)	0.0 (0.0)	0.0 (0.0)	0.1 (0.25)	0.5 (1.3)	1.3 (3.35)
Average precipitation days (≥ 0.01 in)	6.6	6.9	7.0	4.4	3.0	1.2	1.2	1.4	1.8	2.6	3.5	5.1	44.7
Average snowy days (≥ 0.1 in)	0.0	0.3	0.1	0.0	0.0	0.0	0.0	0.0	0.0	0.0	0.1	0.2	0.7
Source 1: NOAA
Source 2: National Weather Service

== Demographics ==
Historical population
Census	Pop.	Note	%±
1920	857		—
1930	1,332		55.4%
1940	2,208		65.8%
1950	3,152		42.8%
1960	4,288		36.0%
1970	5,484		27.9%
1980	6,818		24.3%
1990	9,685		42.1%
2000	11,384		17.5%
2010	36,877		223.9%
2020	53,036		43.8%
U.S. Decennial Census

=== Racial and ethnic composition ===
Race / Ethnicity (NH = Non-Hispanic)	Pop 1980	Pop 1990	Pop 2000	Pop 2010	Pop 2020	% 1980	% 1990	% 2000	% 2010	% 2020
White alone (NH)	5,195	6,795	6,334	15,831	19,075	76.20%	70.16%	55.34%	42.93%	35.97%
Black or African American alone (NH)	32	234	304	2,155	4,167	0.47%	2.42%	2.67%	5.85%	7.86%
Native American or Alaska Native alone (NH)	78	138	180	282	309	1.14%	1.42%	1.58%	0.76%	0.58%
Asian alone (NH)	151	182	187	2,745	4,460	2.21%	1.88%	1.64%	7.44%	8.41%
Native Hawaiian or Pacific Islander alone (NH)	151	182	7	65	95	2.21%	1.88%	0.06%	0.18%	0.18%
Other race alone (NH)	18	13	13	68	281	0.26%	0.13%	0.11%	0.18%	0.53%
Mixed race or Multiracial (NH)	x	x	237	867	2,103	x	x	2.08%	2.35%	3.97%
Hispanic or Latino (any race)	1,344	2,323	4,122	14,864	22,546	19.71%	23.99%	36.21%	40.31%	41.51%
Total	6,818	9,685	11,384	36,877	53,036	100.00%	100.00%	100.00%	100.00%	100.00%

=== 2020 census ===
As of the 2020 census, Beaumont had a population of 53,036. The median age was 36.8 years. 27.2% of residents were under the age of 18 and 15.6% of residents were 65 years of age or older. For every 100 females there were 94.4 males, and for every 100 females age 18 and over there were 91.3 males age 18 and over.

97.8% of residents lived in urban areas, while 2.2% lived in rural areas.

There were 16,806 households in Beaumont, of which 42.9% had children under the age of 18 living in them. Of all households, 60.0% were married-couple households, 12.1% were households with a male householder and no spouse or partner present, and 21.3% were households with a female householder and no spouse or partner present. About 15.6% of all households were made up of individuals and 8.2% had someone living alone who was 65 years of age or older.

There were 17,311 housing units, of which 2.9% were vacant. The homeowner vacancy rate was 1.0% and the rental vacancy rate was 3.2%.

Racial composition as of the 2020 census
Race	Number	Percent
White	24,091	45.4%
Black or African American	4,380	8.3%
American Indian and Alaska Native	934	1.8%
Asian	4,613	8.7%
Native Hawaiian and Other Pacific Islander	114	0.2%
Some other race	10,318	19.5%
Two or more races	8,586	16.2%

=== 2023 American Community Survey estimates ===
In 2023, the US Census Bureau estimated that 14.9% of the population were foreign-born. Of all people aged 5 or older, 69.7% spoke only English at home, 22.8% spoke Spanish, 1.7% spoke other Indo-European languages, 5.2% spoke Asian or Pacific Islander languages, and 0.6% spoke other languages. Of those aged 25 or older, 89.7% were high school graduates and 27.8% had a bachelor's degree.

The median household income in 2023 was $105,164, and the per capita income was $37,360. About 6.5% of families and 9.2% of the population were below the poverty line.

=== 2010 census ===
The 2010 United States census reported that Beaumont had a population of 36,877. The population density was 1,192.4 inhabitants per square mile (460.4/km^{2}). The racial makeup of Beaumont was 23,163 (62.8%) White (42.9% Non-Hispanic White), 2,276 (6.2%) African American, 544 (1.5%) Native American, 2,845 (7.7%) Asian, 83 (0.2%) Pacific Islander, 6,058 (16.4%) from other races, and 1,908 (5.2%) from two or more races. Hispanic or Latino of any race were 14,864 persons (40.3%).

The Census reported that 36,403 people (98.7% of the population) lived in households, 263 (0.7%) lived in non-institutionalized group quarters, and 211 (0.6%) were institutionalized.

There were 11,801 households, out of which 5,341 (45.3%) had children under the age of 18 living in them, 7,152 (60.6%) were opposite-sex married couples living together, 1,452 (12.3%) had a female householder with no husband present, 708 (6.0%) had a male householder with no wife present. There were 767 (6.5%) unmarried opposite-sex partnerships, and 106 (0.9%) same-sex married couples or partnerships; 1,906 households (16.2%) were made up of individuals, and 695 (5.9%) had someone living alone who was 65 years of age or older. The average household size was 3.08. There were 9,312 families (78.9% of all households); the average family size was 3.44.

The population was spread out, with 11,121 people (30.2%) under the age of 18, 2,904 people (7.9%) aged 18 to 24, 11,058 people (30.0%) aged 25 to 44, 7,905 people (21.4%) aged 45 to 64, and 3,889 people (10.5%) who were 65 years of age or older. The median age was 32.5 years. For every 100 females, there were 95.2 males. For every 100 females age 18 and over, there were 91.1 males.

There were 12,908 housing units at an average density of 417.4 per square mile (161.2/km^{2}), of which 8,846 (75.0%) were owner-occupied, and 2,955 (25.0%) were occupied by renters. The homeowner vacancy rate was 4.3%; the rental vacancy rate was 5.9%. 26,871 people (72.9% of the population) lived in owner-occupied housing units and 9,532 people (25.8%) lived in rental housing units.

According to the 2010 United States Census, Beaumont had a median household income of $67,758, with 11.2% of the population living below the federal poverty line.

== Economy ==
There are several big box stores in town, located in the 2nd Street Marketplace. Other major businesses in the 2nd Street Marketplace area include many chain stores, restaurants and a movie theater.

== Arts and culture ==
The Beaumont Library District, a California special district, independent of both city and county government, provides library services to Beaumont and Cherry Valley.

== Parks and recreation ==
In addition to the parks and recreational activities provided by the city's own Parks and Recreation Department, additional services are provided by the Beaumont-Cherry Valley Recreation and Park District.

Local recreational possibilities include two golf courses: the Tukwet Canyon and Oak Valley Golf Clubs.

The nearby Highland Springs Resort, established in 1884, hosts Southern California's largest certified organic lavender farm at 123 Farm, the Annual Lavender Festival in June, the Annual Sausage and Beer Festival in August, and the Annual Olive & Wine Faire in October. Beaumont is home to the Annual Cherry Festival, which celebrated its 100th anniversary from May 31 to June 3, 2018.

== Government ==
Beaumont vote by party in presidential elections
Year	Democratic	Republican	Third Parties
2024	44.51% 11,088	53.19% 13,249	2.30% 573
2020	48.27% 11,654	49.68% 11,995	2.05% 495
2016	44.25% 6,888	50.75% 7,900	5.00% 778
2012	45.39% 5,519	52.60% 6,395	2.01% 244
2008	47.28% 4,854	50.96% 5,232	1.76% 181
2004	37.18% 1,944	61.48% 3,215	1.34% 70
2000	46.05% 1,253	49.58% 1,349	4.37% 119
1996	42.39% 1,103	42.58% 1,108	15.03% 391
1992	38.95% 1,181	35.09% 1,064	25.96% 787

=== Local government ===
The current mayor and council members are:

- Mayor: Mike Lara
- Mayor Pro Tem: Jessica Voigt
- Council Members: Lloyd White, David Fenn, and Julio Martinez III

=== State and federal ===
In the California State Legislature, Beaumont is in the 19th senatorial district, represented by Republican Rosilicie Ochoa Bogh, and in the 47th Assembly district, represented by Republican Greg Wallis.

In the United States House of Representatives, Beaumont is in California's 25th congressional district. The district is represented by Democrat Raul Ruiz, who defeated Mary Bono in 2012, after redistricting reassigned her seat from the District 44 to District 36. In 2014, Democrat Raul Ruiz defeated Republican Brian Nestande 54.2 percent to 45.8 percent. Prior to the 2012 General Election, Beaumont was in District 41, represented by Republican Jerry Lewis. Lewis announced his retirement before the election, which was contested by Republican John Tavaglione and Democrat Mark Takano who won the new (redistricted) seat.

== Education ==
The Beaumont Unified School District has schools within city limits and in the neighboring community of Cherry Valley.

- High schools: Beaumont, Glen View (continuation), Beaumont High School, Mojave River Academy.
- Middle schools: Mountain View, San Gorgonio Middle school.
- K-8 schools: Summerwind Trails
- Elementary schools: Anna Hause, Brookside, Highland Springs, Palm Avenue, Sundance, Starlight, Three Rings Ranch and Tournament Hills

There is a single school by the name of Highland Academy Charter School that is not officially a part of the Beaumont Unified School District, but still follows its guidelines.

The majority of Beaumont is in Beaumont USD. Portions are in the Banning Unified School District and the San Jacinto Unified School District.

== Infrastructure ==
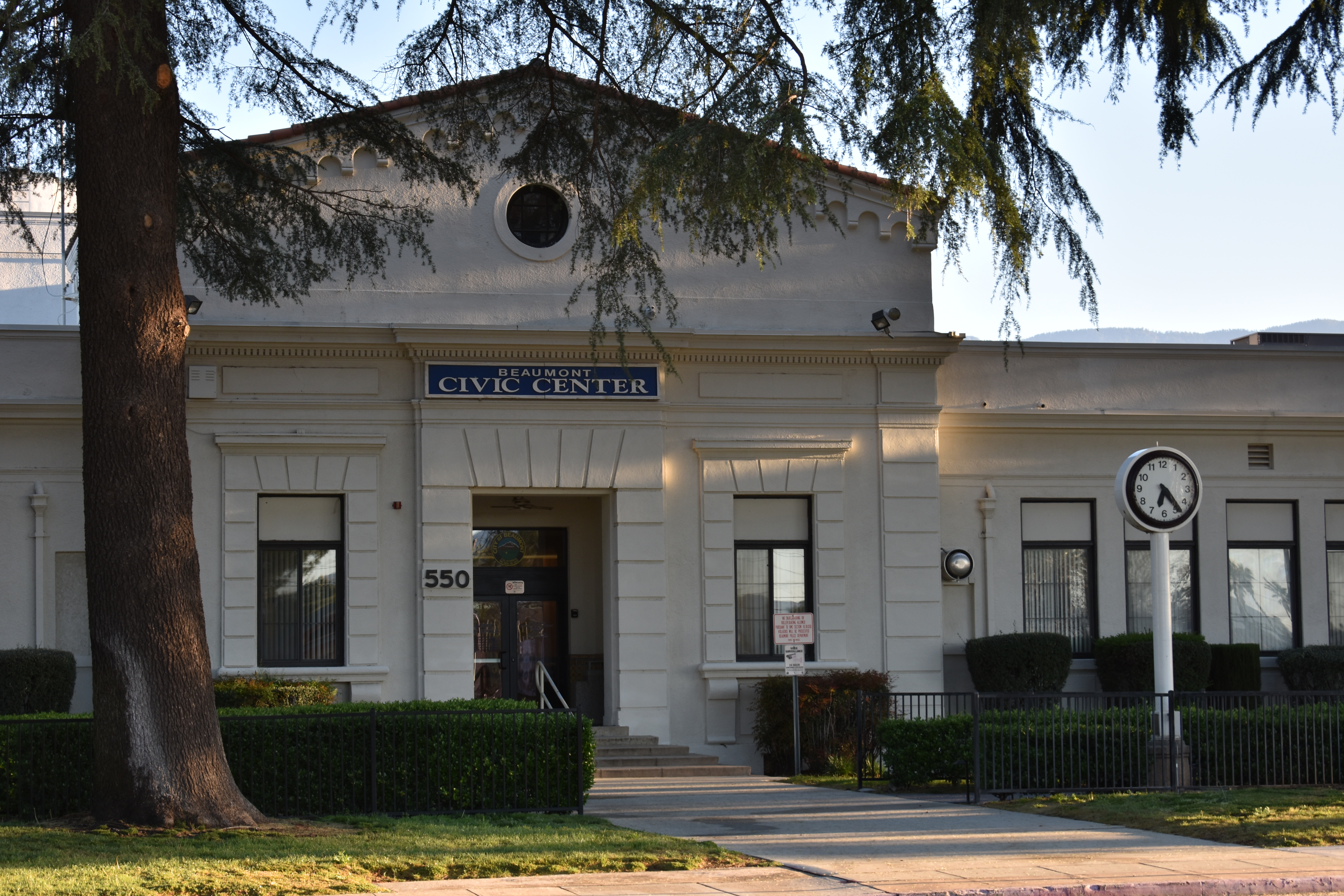
Beaumont Civic Center

=== Public safety ===
The California Highway Patrol has a regional office on the Beaumont side of Highland Springs Avenue (its jurisdiction goes from Calimesa to the west to Desert Hot Springs to the east, as well as Hemet and San Jacinto to the south).

Law enforcement is provided by the Beaumont Police Department.

The City of Beaumont contracts for fire and paramedic services with the Riverside County Fire Department through a cooperative agreement with CAL FIRE. Station 66 of the City of Beaumont Fire Services maintains two type 1 engines and one paramedic squad.

== Notable people ==
- Tracy Caldwell Dyson, NASA astronaut, graduate of Beaumont High School (1987)
- Scott Haskin, professional basketball player, grew up in Beaumont.
- Brion James, actor
- George Wagner, professional wrestler known as "Gorgeous George", had a 195-acre (0.79 km^{2}) turkey ranch in Beaumont in the late 1950s to early 1960s.
- Amir Zaki, American photographic and video artist

== In popular culture ==
The 1995 movie How to Make an American Quilt filmed many of its driving scenes through Beaumont. Local wildlife in the surrounding vicinity include quail, coyotes, and foxes. The town has been home to different antique store establishments dating back several decades, such as the now defunct Nettie and Alice Museum of Hobbies.

A few episodes of the TV show My Name Is Earl were filmed in Beaumont, as well as many of the show's opening scenes; the liquor store where he buys the winning lotto ticket, the car wash, and the scene where Earl gets hit by a car were all filmed near the intersection of 6th Street and Pennsylvania Avenue.
