= List of places in California (A) =

List of places in California - A

This list of current:

- cities
- towns, unincorporated communities
- counties, and other recognized places in the U.S. state of California.

Information on the number and names of counties in which the place lies, and its lower and upper ZIP Code bounds, if applicable are also included.

== Ab to Ag ==
Name of place	Number of counties	Principal county	Lower zip code	Upper zip code
Abalone Cove	1	Los Angeles County	90274	
Academy	1	Fresno County	93612	
Acampo	1	San Joaquin County	95220	
Actis	1	Kern County		
Actis Gardens	1	Kern County	93501	
Acton	1	Los Angeles County	93510	
Adams	1	Lake County		
Adams Square	1	Los Angeles County		
Adelaida	1	San Luis Obispo County	93446	
Adelaide	1	Butte County		
Adelanto	1	San Bernardino County	92301	
Adin	1	Modoc County	96006	
Adin-Lookout	1	Modoc County		
Adobe Corner	1	San Mateo County		
Advance	1	Tulare County		
Aerial Acres	1	Kern County	93523	
Aetna Springs	1	Napa County	94567	
Afton	1	Glenn County	95920	
Afton	1	San Bernardino County		
Ager	1	Siskiyou County		
Agnew's Village	1	Santa Clara County	95054	
Agoura	1	Los Angeles County	91301	
Agoura Hills	1	Los Angeles County	91301	
Agra	1	San Diego County		
Agua Caliente	1	Sonoma County	95476	
Agua Caliente Indian Reservation	1	Riverside County	92263	
Agua Dulce	1	Los Angeles County	91350	
Agua Fria	1	Mariposa County		
Aguanga	1	Riverside County	92536	

== Ah to Al ==
Name of place	Number of counties	Principal county	Lower zip code	Upper zip code
Ahwahnee	1	Madera County	93601	
Ainsworth Corner	1	Siskiyou County		
Akers	1	San Joaquin County		
Alameda	1	Alameda County	94501	
Alameda	1	Kern County		
Alamitos	1	Los Angeles County		
Alamitos	1	Santa Clara County		
Alamo	1	Contra Costa County	94507	
Alamo Oaks	1	Contra Costa County	94526	
Alamorio	1	Imperial County	92227	
Alba	1	San Joaquin County		
Albany	1	Alameda County	94706	
Alberhill	1	Riverside County	92530	
Albert	1	Sacramento County		
Albion	1	Mendocino County	95410	
Alderbrook Tract	1	Santa Clara County	95014	
Alder Creek	1	Sacramento County		
Aldercroft Heights	1	Santa Clara County	95030	
Alderglen Springs	1	Sonoma County		
Alderpoint	1	Humboldt County	95511	
Alder Springs	1	Fresno County	93602	
Alder Springs	1	Glenn County		
Alemandra	1	Sutter County		
Alessandro	1	Riverside County	92508	
Alexander Valley	1	Sonoma County	95441	
Algerine	1	Tuolumne County	95370	
Alhambra	1	Los Angeles County	91801	99
Alhambra Valley	1	Contra Costa County	94553	
Alisal	1	Monterey County	93905	
Aliso Viejo	1	Orange County	92656	
Alla	1	Los Angeles County		
Alleghany	1	Sierra County	95910	
Allendale	1	Solano County	95688	
Allensworth	1	Tulare County	93219	
Alliance	1	Humboldt County	95521	
Alliance Redwood	1	Sonoma County		
Allied Gardens	1	San Diego County		
Almaden	1	Santa Clara County		
Almaden Valley	1	Santa Clara County	95120	
Almanor	1	Plumas County		
Almanor	1	Plumas County	95947	
Almondale	1	Los Angeles County	93553	
Almonte	1	Marin County	94941	
Alondra	1	Los Angeles County	90249	
Alondra Park	1	Los Angeles County		
Alpaugh	1	Tulare County	93201	
Alpine	1	San Diego County	91901	
Alpine Heights	1	San Diego County	92001	
Alpine Hills	1	San Mateo County	94025	
Alpine Village	1	Alpine County		
Alpine Village	1	Tulare County	93265	
Alray	1	San Bernardino County		
Alsace	1	Los Angeles County		
Alsco	1	San Joaquin County		
Alta	1	Placer County	95701	
Altadena	1	Los Angeles County	91001	
Alta Hill	1	Nevada County	95945	
Al Tahoe	1	El Dorado County	95705	
Alta Loma	1	San Bernardino County	91701	
Alta Mesa	1	Santa Clara County		
Altamont	1	Alameda County		
Alta Sierra	1	Nevada County	93285	
Alta Sierra Estates	1	Nevada County	95945	
Altaville	1	Calaveras County	95221	
Alta Vista	1	Alameda County		
Alto	1	Marin County	94941	
Alton	1	Humboldt County	95540	
Alturas	1	Modoc County	96101	
Alturas Rancheria	1	Modoc County	96101	
Alum Rock	1	Santa Clara County	95127	
Alvarado	1	Alameda County	94587	
Alviso	1	Santa Clara County	95002	

== Am to An ==
Name of place	Number of counties	Principal county	Lower zip code	Upper zip code
Amador City	1	Amador County	95601	
Amargosa	1	Inyo County		
Ambassador	1	Los Angeles County	90070	
Ambler	1	Tulare County	93291	
Ambler Park	1	Monterey County	93901	
Amboy	1	San Bernardino County	92304	
Ambrose	1	Contra Costa County	94565	
American Canyon	1	Napa County	94589	
Amesti	1	Santa Cruz County		
Ampere	1	San Joaquin County		
Amphibious Base	1	San Diego County	92155	
Amsterdam	1	Merced County		
Anaheim	1	Orange County	92801	99
Anaheim Hills	1	Orange County	92807	08
Anchor Bay	1	Mendocino County	95445	
Anderson	1	Shasta County	96007	
Andersonia	1	Mendocino County		
Anderson Springs	1	Lake County	95461	
Andesite	1	Siskiyou County		
Andrade	1	Imperial County	92283	
Andrew Jackson	1	San Diego County	92115	
Angeles Mesa	1	Los Angeles County		
Angels	1	Calaveras County		
Angels Camp	1	Calaveras County	95222	
Angels City	1	Calaveras County	95222	
Angelus Oaks	1	San Bernardino County	92305	
Angiola	1	Tulare County	93212	
Angwin	1	Napa County	94508	
Anita	1	Butte County		
Annapolis	1	Sonoma County	95412	
Annex III	1	Los Angeles County	91405	
Antelope	1	Sacramento County	95843	
Antelope Acres	1	Los Angeles County	93536	
Antelope Center	1	Los Angeles County	93550	
Antes	1	Tulare County		
Antioch	1	Contra Costa County	94509	
Antioch-Pittsburg	1	Contra Costa County		
Antlers	1	Shasta County		
Antonio	1	Santa Barbara County	93437	
Anza	1	Riverside County	92539	
Anza Acres	1	Riverside County	92539	
Anza-Borrego Springs	1	San Diego County		
Anza Village	1	Riverside County		

== Ap to Ar ==
Name of place	Number of counties	Principal county	Lower zip code	Upper zip code
Applegate	1	Placer County	95703	
Apple Valley	1	San Bernardino County	92307	08
Aptos	1	Santa Cruz County	95003	
Aptos Hills-Larkin Valley	1	Santa Cruz County		
Aranbee	1	Los Angeles County		
Arastraville	1	Tuolumne County		
Araz Junction	1	Imperial County		
Arboga	1	Yuba County	95901	
Arbolada	1	Ventura County	93023	
Arbuckle	1	Colusa County	95912	
Arcade	1	Los Angeles County	90052	
Arcade	1	Sacramento County	95821	
Arcadia	1	Los Angeles County	91006	
Arcata	1	Humboldt County	95521	
Arch Beach Heights	1	Orange County	92651	
Archer	1	San Bernardino County		
Arco-Plaza	1	Los Angeles County	90071	
Arden	1	Sacramento County	95825	
Arden-Arcade	1	Sacramento County		
Arden Town	1	Sacramento County	95825	
Ardmore	1	Los Angeles County	90280	
Arguello	1	Santa Barbara County		
Argus	1	San Bernardino County	93562	
Arlanza	1	Riverside County		
Arlanza Village	1	Riverside County	92505	
Arleta	1	Los Angeles County	91331	
Arlight	1	Santa Barbara County		
Arlington	1	Riverside County	92503	
Arlington Station	1	Riverside County		
Arlynda Corners	1	Humboldt County	95536	
Armistead	1	Kern County	93527	
Armona	1	Kings County	93202	
Armstrong	1	San Joaquin County		
Army Point	1	Solano County		
Army Terminal	1	Alameda County	94626	
Arnaz	1	Los Angeles County		
Arnold	1	Calaveras County	95223	
Arnold	1	Mendocino County		
Arnold	1	Stanislaus County		
Arnold Heights	1	Riverside County	95218	
Aromas	2	Monterey County; San Benito County	95004	
Arrowbear Lake	1	San Bernardino County	92382	
Arrowhead	1	San Bernardino County		
Arrowhead Highlands	1	San Bernardino County	92325	
Arrowhead Springs	1	San Bernardino County		
Arroyo Grande	1	San Luis Obispo County	93420	
Arroz	1	Yolo County		
Artesia	1	Los Angeles County	90701	
Artois	1	Glenn County	95913	
Arvin	1	Kern County	93203	

== As to Az ==
Name of place	Number of counties	Principal county	Lower zip code	Upper zip code
Ashford Junction	1	Inyo County		
Ashford Mill	1	Inyo County		
Ash Hill	1	San Bernardino County		
Ashland	1	Alameda County	94541	
Ashlan Park	1	Fresno County	93726	
Ashrama	1	Santa Clara County		
Asilomar	1	Monterey County	93950	
Aspendell	1	Inyo County	93514	
Aspen Valley	1	Tuolumne County		
Asti	1	Sonoma County	95425	
Asuncion	1	San Luis Obispo County		
Atascadero	1	San Luis Obispo County	93422	
Athens	1	Los Angeles County	90047	
Atherton	1	San Mateo County	94027	
Athlone	1	Merced County	95333	
Atlanta	1	San Joaquin County	95366	
Atlantic Richfield Plaza	1	Los Angeles County	90071	
Atlas	1	Napa County		
Atolia	1	San Bernardino County	93558	
Atwater	1	Los Angeles County		
Atwater	1	Merced County	95301	
Atwood	1	Orange County	92811	
Auberry	1	Fresno County	93602	
Auburn	1	Placer County	95603	
Auckland	1	Tulare County		
August	1	San Joaquin County		
Augustine Indian Reservation	1	Riverside County	92274	
August School Area	1	San Joaquin County	95205	
Aukum	1	El Dorado County		
Aurora	1	Stanislaus County		
Avalon	1	Los Angeles County	90704	
Avalon Village	1	Los Angeles County	90744	
Avena	1	San Joaquin County		
Avenal	1	Kings County	93204	
Avery	1	Calaveras County	95224	
Avila Beach	1	San Luis Obispo County	93424	
Avinsino Corner	1	El Dorado County		
Avocado	1	Fresno County		
Avocado Heights	1	Los Angeles County	91746	
Avon	1	Contra Costa County		
Azalea	1	Siskiyou County		
Azure Vista	1	San Diego County		
Azusa	1	Los Angeles County	91702	
