= Afton =

Afton may refer to:

== Places ==
=== Canada ===
- Afton River (Nova Scotia)
- Afton, Nova Scotia
- Afton, Prince Edward Island
- Afton Station, Nova Scotia

=== United Kingdom ===
- River Afton, Ayrshire, Scotland
- Glen Afton, Ayrshire, Scotland
- Afton Reservoir, Ayrshire, Scotland
- Afton, Isle of Wight

=== United States ===
- Afton, Glenn County, California
- Afton, San Bernardino County, California
- Afton, Delaware
- Afton, Georgia, a place in Georgia
- Afton, Iowa
- Afton, Louisiana
- Affton, Missouri
- Afton, Michigan
- Afton, Charlevoix County, Michigan, ghost town
- Afton, Minnesota
- Afton, Nevada
- Afton, New Jersey
- Afton, New Mexico
- Afton (town), New York
  - Afton (village), New York
- Afton, Ohio
- Afton, Oklahoma
- Afton, Tennessee
- Afton, Texas
- Afton, Virginia
- Afton, Wisconsin
- Afton, West Virginia
- Afton, Wyoming
- Afton Center, Illinois
- Afton Run, North Carolina
- Afton Township, Arkansas
- Afton Township, Iowa
- Afton Township, DeKalb County, Illinois
- Afton Township, Sedgwick County, Kansas
- Afton Township, North Dakota
- Afton Township, Brookings County, South Dakota
- Afton Township, Sanborn County, South Dakota
- Afton State Park, Minnesota

== Given name ==
- Afton Williamson, American actress (born 1984)
- Afton Cooper, fictional character from the television series Dallas
- William Afton, the main antagonist of the Five Nights at Freddy's game series

== Businesses ==
- Afton Chemical, American petroleum additives manufacturer
