= Afton Township =

Afton Township may refer to the following townships in the United States:

- Afton Township, Fulton County, Arkansas
- Afton Township, DeKalb County, Illinois
- Afton Township, Cherokee County, Iowa
- Afton Township, Howard County, Iowa
- Afton Township, Sedgwick County, Kansas
- Afton Township, Ward County, North Dakota
- Afton Township, Brookings County, South Dakota
- Afton Township, Sanborn County, South Dakota
