= Tennessee Virtual Academy =

Information
- NCES School ID: 470429002280
- Faculty: 36.5
- Grades: K-8
- Enrollment: 634 (2016)
- Campus type: virtual
- Revenue: $14,097,629
- Website: tnva.k12.com

Tennessee Virtual Academy is a virtual K-8 school sponsored by the Union County, Tennessee Public Schools and operated by for-profit education management organization Stride, Inc. It is one of nine virtual schools in the state. Tennessee Online Public School serves grades 9–12.

The performance of the school was the subject of debate in the Tennessee General Assembly, which voted in 2015 to shut the school down. The school remained open for the 2017-2018 school year,

== Operations ==
The school is operated by K12. In 2014–15 school year, the school cost the state $14,097,629.

Tennessee and nearby states offer government-sponsored virtual schools as a means to support homeschooling. Indiana offers Indiana Virtual School serving 1,320 students in grades 6–12. Ohio Virtual Academy serves 9,466 students in grades K–12.
