= Alder Springs =

Alder Springs may refer to:

- Alder Springs, Fresno County, California, unincorporated community
- Alder Springs, Glenn County, California, unincorporated community
- Alder Springs, Campbell County, Tennessee, unincorporated community
- Alder Springs, Union County, Tennessee, unincorporated community
