= Actis =

Actis may refer to:

- Actis (mythology), a Heliadae in Greek mythology
- Actis, California, an unincorporated community in Kern County, California, United States
- Actis, a synonym of the butterfly genus Pilodeudorix
- Actis Capital, a British private equity firm

== People with the surname ==
- Carlo Actis Dato (born 1952), Italian jazz saxophonist and composer

== See also ==
- ACTI
