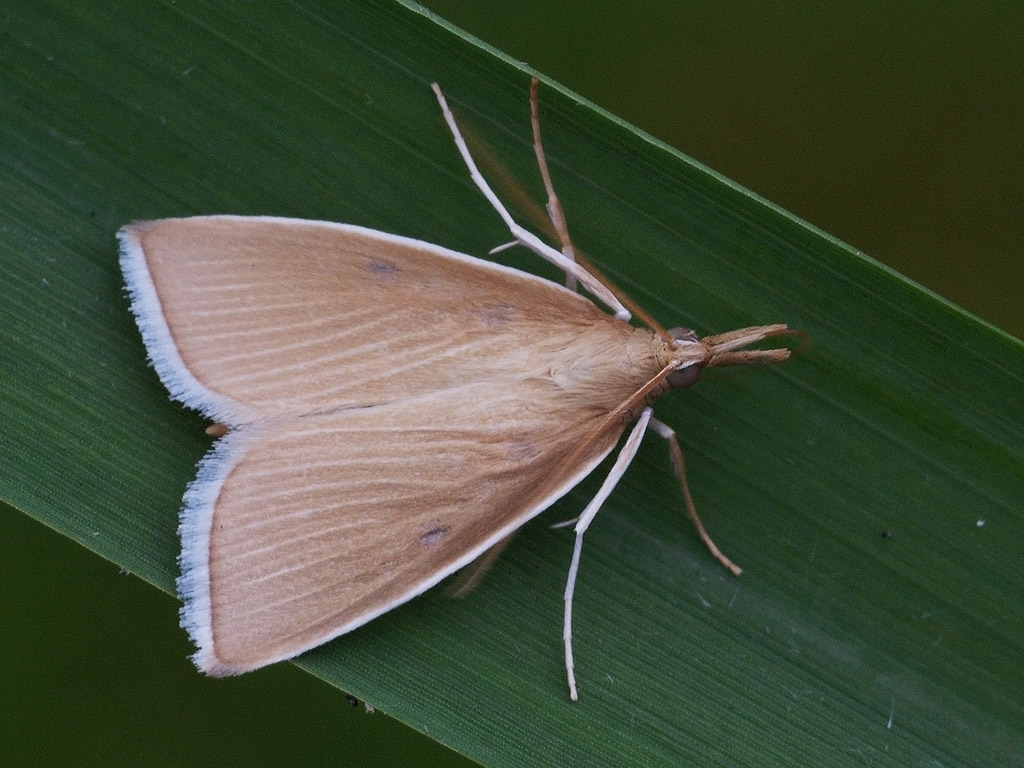

Scientific classification
- Domain: Eukaryota
- Kingdom: Animalia
- Phylum: Arthropoda
- Class: Insecta
- Order: Lepidoptera
- Family: Crambidae
- Subfamily: Pyraustinae
- Genus: Sclerocona; Meyrick, 1890
- Species: S. acutella

Binomial name
- Sclerocona acutella (Eversmann, 1842)

Synonyms
- Chilo acutella Eversmann, 1842; Sclerocona acutellus; Crambus sinensellus Walker, 1863; Crambus tincticostellus Walker, 1863; Duponchelia cilialis Herrich-Schäffer, 1849

= Sclerocona =

Genus of moths

Sclerocona is a genus of moths of the family Crambidae which contains only one species, Sclerocona acutella (also known as the streaked orange moth). It was first described by the Prussian biologist Eduard Friedrich Eversmann in 1842.

== Life cycle ==
The wingspan is 25–28 mm. Adults are light brown. Larvae have been recorded feeding on corn (Zea species), nightshade and tomato (Lycopersicon species), hop (Humulus species), reed (Phragmites species) and wild bean (Phaseolus species).

== Distribution ==
The moth is found from Spain and Sicily north to Great Britain and Denmark and east to Siberia, China and Japan. It is an introduced species in eastern North America.

In Great Britain, the first three records (1988 to 1995) were thought to be migrants, but subsequent records from a garden near Exeter, close to a newly-thatched cottage are believed to have originated from reeds imported from central Europe. A colony was discovered, in 2010, on the Isle of Wight at Afton Marsh and has been recorded annually since. The origin of the Isle of Wight moths in unknown and migration would seem the more likely.
