= AlphaCom (schools) =

Coordinates: 39.9282°N 86.1493°W

- Industry: For profit education
- Headquarters: Carmel, Indiana, United States
- Key people: Christipher King, Thomas Stoughton

AlphaCom is an operator of for-profit virtual schools based in Carmel, Indiana. The schools, including Indiana Virtual School, have been criticized for low graduation rates and high student-teacher ratios. This is the lowest graduation rate of any high school in the state.
