= The Last Message Received =

Tumblr blog

The Last Message Received is a submission-based blog on the social networking site Tumblr. It was created in November 2015 by 16-year-old Ohio native Emily Trunko, a student at the Ohio Virtual Academy. The blog is composed primarily of text messages, almost always the last ones received from ex-lovers, deceased family members, or former friends. "I've always been fascinated with glimpses into the lives of other people," Trunko explained in an interview with Buzzfeed. "I thought that the last message sent before a breakup or before someone passed away would be really poignant." Messages range from being long and detailed to extremely short. Some are goodbyes, and others are mundane texts sent by people who didn't know that message would be their last. As of February 10, 2016, The Last Message Received has over 83,000 followers and 10,000 submissions. It has been written about by many major publications, including The Guardian, The Huffington Post, Cosmopolitan Magazine, and Teen Vogue.

== See also ==
- Dear My Blank - another Tumblr blog by Trunko
