= Tennessee Online Public School =

American virtual high school

Information
- Founded: 2012
- NCES School ID: 470036002308
- Faculty: 45
- Grades: K-12
- Enrollment: 208 (2016)
- Student to teacher ratio: 5
- Campus type: virtual
- Website: tops.education

Tennessee Online Public School is a virtual high school in the U.S. state of Tennessee, serving 208 students in grades K-12. It is unranked by U.S. News & World Report.

It is one of nine virtual schools in the state.

== Operations ==
The Tennessee General Assembly passed the “Virtual Public Schools Act" (2011) authorizing this school and the others in the state.

Tennessee and nearby states offer government sponsored virtual schools as a means to support homeschooling. Indiana offers Hoosier Academy Virtual Charter School serving 3,861 and Indiana Virtual School serving 1,320 students in grades 6-12. Ohio Virtual Academy serves 9,466 students in grades K-12.
