= Union County, Tennessee =

County in Tennessee, United States

- County
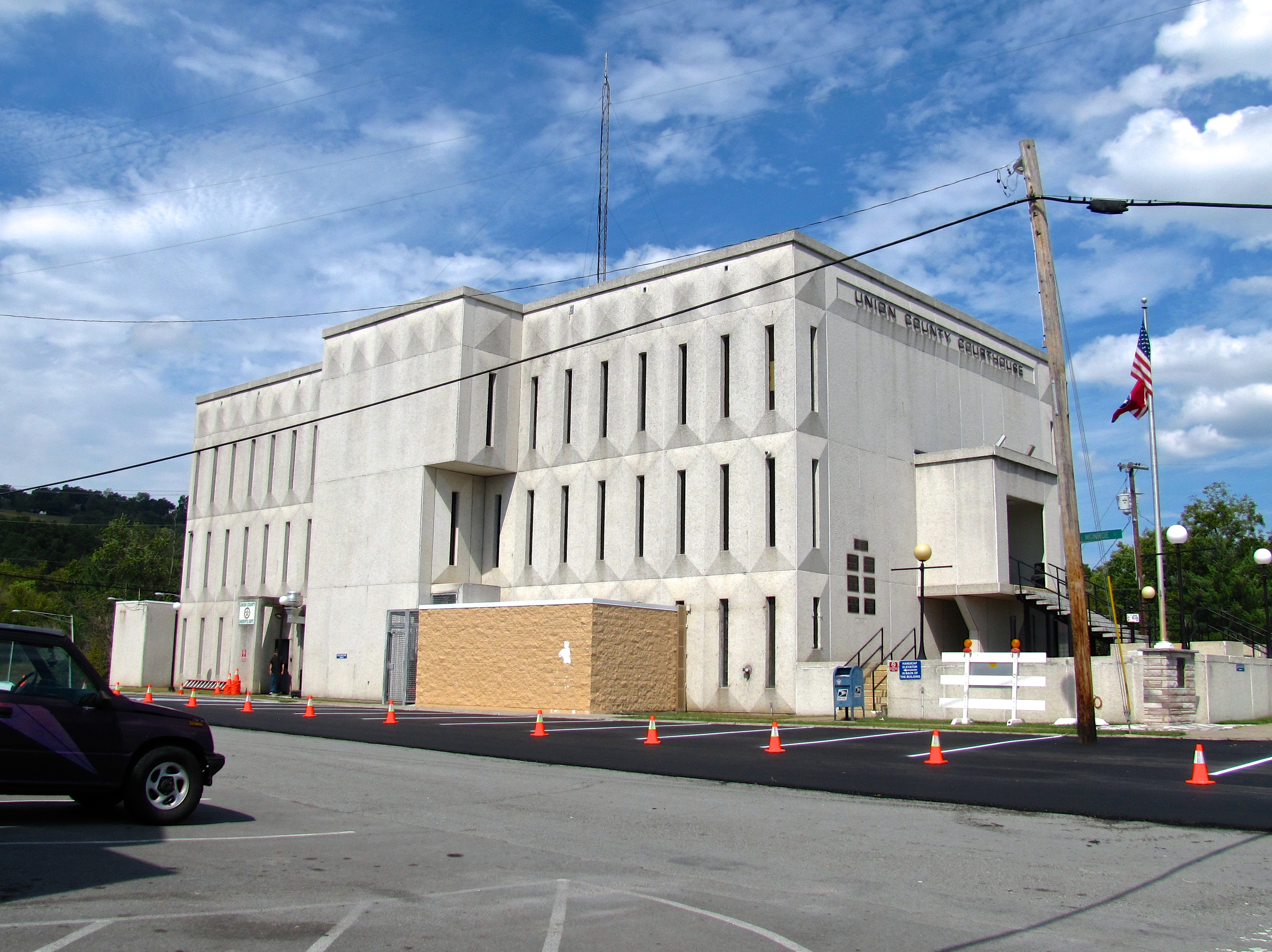
- Union County Courthouse in Maynardville

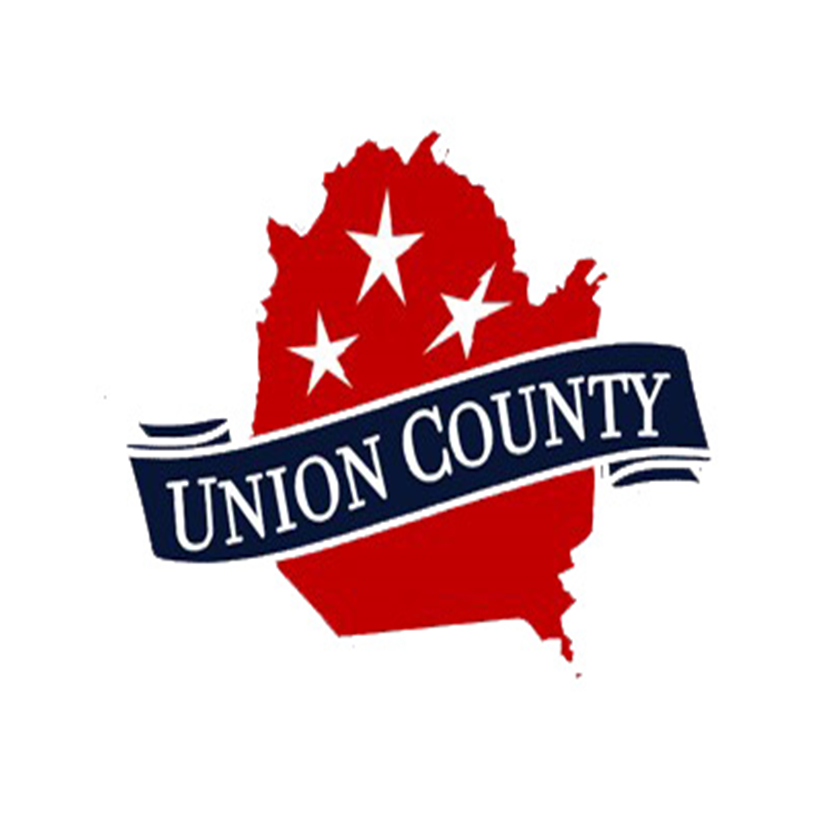
- Flag Logo

- Location within the U.S. state of Tennessee
- Coordinates: 36°17′N 83°50′W
- Country: United States
- State: Tennessee
- Founded: January 23, 1856
- Named for: Either its creation from parts of five other counties or its support for the Union during the Civil War
- Seat: Maynardville
- Largest city: Maynardville

Government
  - Mayor: Jason Bailey

Area
  - Total: 247 sq mi (640 km^{2})
  - Land: 224 sq mi (580 km^{2})
  - Water: 24 sq mi (62 km^{2}) 9.5%

Population (2020)
  - Total: 19,802
  - Estimate (2025): 21,450 ▲
  - Density: 85/sq mi (33/km^{2})
- Time zone: UTC−5 (Eastern)
  - Summer (DST): UTC−4 (EDT)
- ZIP Codes: 37721, 37779, 37807, 37866, 37705
- Area code: 865
- Congressional district: 3rd
- Website: www.unioncountytn.com

Union County is a county located in the U.S. state of Tennessee. As of the 2020 census, its population was 19,802. Its county seat is Maynardville. Union County is included in the Knoxville metropolitan area.

== History ==
Union County was created from the union of parts of five adjacent counties.

Union County was formed in 1850 from portions of Grainger, Claiborne, Campbell, Anderson, and Knox Counties. At least two theories are given on the source of its name. The name may commemorate the "union" of sections of five counties, or it may reflect East Tennessee's support for the preservation of the Union in the years before and during the Civil War. The enabling legislation was initially passed January 3, 1850, but due to legal challenges and complications, the county was not formally created until January 23, 1856. The county seat was originally named "Liberty", but renamed "Maynardville" in honor of attorney and congressman Horace Maynard, who had defended the county in a court case that sought to block its formation.

In the 1930s, the damming of the Clinch River by the construction of Norris Dam by the Tennessee Valley Authority (TVA) to form Norris Lake inundated a large part of the county, including the community of Loyston, and displaced many residents. "The Move," what many displaced families called the forced relocation by TVA, would encounter criticism, as the promise of electrification of Union County would not come after the completion of Norris Dam, but two decades later in the mid-1950s. With assistance from the National Park Service and the Civilian Conservation Corps, the TVA developed Big Ridge State Park as a demonstration park on the shore of Norris Lake in Union County. The park's recreational facilities opened in May 1934.

== Geography ==
According to the U.S. Census Bureau, the county has a total area of 247 sq mi (640 km^{2}), of which 224 sq mi (580 km^{2}) are land and 24 sq mi (62 km^{2}) (9.5%) are covered by water. The county is situated in the Ridge-and-Valley Appalachians, a range characterized by long, narrow ridges alternating with similarly shaped valleys. Prominent ridges in Union County include Copper Ridge, Hinds Ridge, and Lone Mountain. The southern end of Clinch Mountain forms part of the county's border with Grainger County to the east.

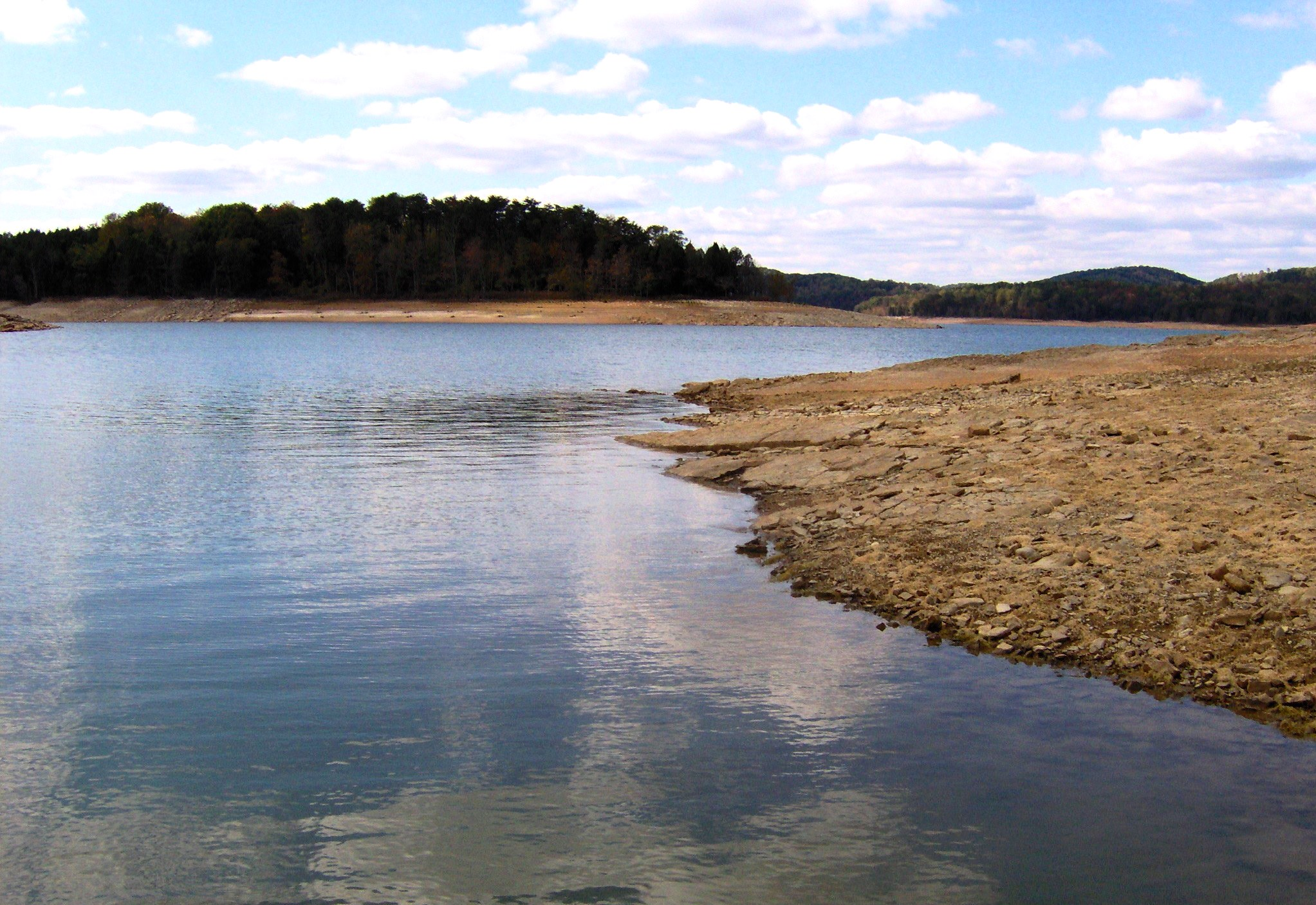
Norris Lake, near Big Ridge State Park

The Clinch River, Union County's primary stream, flows through the northern part of the county. This section of the river is part of Norris Lake. Big Ridge Dam, a small, nongenerating dam, impounds an inlet of Norris Lake, creating Big Ridge Lake at Big Ridge State Park. The "Loyston Sea", one of the widest sections of Norris Lake, is located in Union County just north of the state park.

=== Adjacent counties ===
- Claiborne County (north)
- Grainger County (east)
- Knox County (south)
- Anderson County (southwest)
- Campbell County (northwest)

=== State protected areas ===
- Big Ridge State Park
- Chuck Swan State Forest (part)

== Demographics ==
Historical population
| Census | Pop. | Note | %± |
|---|---|---|---|
| 1860 | 6,117 | | — |
| 1870 | 7,605 | | 24.3% |
| 1880 | 10,260 | | 34.9% |
| 1890 | 11,459 | | 11.7% |
| 1900 | 12,894 | | 12.5% |
| 1910 | 11,414 | | −11.5% |
| 1920 | 11,615 | | 1.8% |
| 1930 | 11,371 | | −2.1% |
| 1940 | 9,030 | | −20.6% |
| 1950 | 8,670 | | −4.0% |
| 1960 | 8,498 | | −2.0% |
| 1970 | 9,072 | | 6.8% |
| 1980 | 11,707 | | 29.0% |
| 1990 | 13,694 | | 17.0% |
| 2000 | 17,808 | | 30.0% |
| 2010 | 19,109 | | 7.3% |
| 2020 | 19,802 | | 3.6% |
| 2025 (est.) | 21,450 | ▲ | 8.3% |
U.S. Decennial Census; 1790-1960 1900-1990; 1990-2000 2010-2014

=== Racial and ethnic composition ===
Union County, Tennessee – Racial and ethnic composition Note: the US Census treats Hispanic/Latino as an ethnic category. This table excludes Latinos from the racial categories and assigns them to a separate category. Hispanics/Latinos may be of any race.
| Race / Ethnicity (NH = Non-Hispanic) | Pop 1980 | Pop 1990 | Pop 2000 | Pop 2010 | Pop 2020 | % 1980 | % 1990 | % 2000 | % 2010 | % 2020 |
|---|---|---|---|---|---|---|---|---|---|---|
| White alone (NH) | 11,556 | 13,624 | 17,426 | 18,539 | 18,642 | 98.71% | 99.49% | 97.85% | 97.02% | 94.14% |
| Black or African American alone (NH) | 1 | 3 | 18 | 21 | 53 | 0.01% | 0.02% | 0.10% | 0.11% | 0.27% |
| Native American or Alaska Native alone (NH) | 17 | 23 | 41 | 44 | 33 | 0.15% | 0.17% | 0.23% | 0.23% | 0.17% |
| Asian alone (NH) | 1 | 5 | 25 | 19 | 36 | 0.01% | 0.04% | 0.14% | 0.10% | 0.18% |
| Native Hawaiian or Pacific Islander alone (NH) | x | x | 3 | 3 | 5 | x | x | 0.02% | 0.02% | 0.03% |
| Other race alone (NH) | 0 | 1 | 5 | 5 | 41 | 0.00% | 0.01% | 0.03% | 0.03% | 0.21% |
| Mixed race or Multiracial (NH) | x | x | 150 | 229 | 588 | x | x | 0.84% | 1.20% | 2.97% |
| Hispanic or Latino (any race) | 132 | 38 | 140 | 249 | 404 | 1.13% | 0.28% | 0.79% | 1.30% | 2.04% |
| Total | 11,707 | 13,694 | 17,808 | 19,109 | 19,802 | 100.00% | 100.00% | 100.00% | 100.00% | 100.00% |

=== 2020 census ===
As of the 2020 census, the county had 19,802 people, 7,794 households, and 5,471 families residing within it. The median age was 42.9 years, 22.5% of residents were under the age of 18, and 18.1% were 65 years of age or older. For every 100 females there were 98.6 males, and for every 100 females age 18 and over there were 97.8 males age 18 and over.

Less than 0.1% of residents lived in urban areas, while 100.0% lived in rural areas.

The racial makeup of the county was 94.8% White, 0.3% Black or African American, 0.2% American Indian and Alaska Native, 0.2% Asian, less than 0.1% Native Hawaiian and Pacific Islander, 1.0% from some other race, and 3.6% from two or more races. Hispanic or Latino residents of any race comprised 2.0% of the population.

There were 7,794 households in the county, of which 30.6% had children under the age of 18 living in them. Of all households, 52.6% were married-couple households, 18.4% were households with a male householder and no spouse or partner present, and 22.7% were households with a female householder and no spouse or partner present. About 24.9% of all households were made up of individuals and 11.7% had someone living alone who was 65 years of age or older.

There were 9,569 housing units, of which 18.5% were vacant. Among occupied housing units, 77.6% were owner-occupied and 22.4% were renter-occupied. The homeowner vacancy rate was 1.1% and the rental vacancy rate was 9.0%.

=== 2000 census ===
At the 2000 census, 17,808 people, 6,742 households and 5,191 families were residing in the county. The population density was 80 people per square mile (31 people/km^{2}). The 7,916 housing units averaged 35 per square mile (14/km^{2}). The racial makeup of the county was 98.46% White, 0.10% African American, 0.23% Native American, 0.16% Asian, 0.19% from other races, and 0.86% from two or more races. About 0.79% of the population were Hispanics or Latinos of any race.

Of the 6,742 households, 35.40% had children under the age of 18 living with them, 62.20% were married couples living together, 10.50% had a female householder with no husband present, and 23.00% were not families. About 19.80% of all households were made up of individuals, and 7.40% had someone living alone who was 65 years of age or older. The average household size was 2.62, and the average family size was 2.99.

The age distribution was 25.70% under 18, 8.90% from 18 to 24, 31.00% from 25 to 44, 23.60% from 45 to 64, and 10.80% who were 65 or older. The median age was 36 years. For every 100 females, there were 98.80 males. For every 100 females age 18 and over, there were 96.60 males.

The median household income was $27,335 and the median family income was $31,843. Males had a median income of $26,436 versus $18,665 for females. The per capita income for the county was $13,375. About 16.80% of families and 19.60% of the population were below the poverty line, including 25.10% of those under age 18 and 27.80% of those age 65 or over.

== Economy ==
=== Top employers ===
According to a data profile produced by the Tennessee Department of Economic and Community Development in 2018, the top employers in the county are:

| | Employer | Employees |
|---|---|---|
| 1 | Union County School District | 350 |
| 2 | Clayton Homes (Maynardville) | 350 |
| 3 | Union County | 150 |
| 4 | Food City | 100 |
| 5 | O-N Minerals Company | 100 |

== Education ==
- Big Ridge Elementary School
- Horace Maynard Middle School (previously Horace Maynard High School until 1997)
- Luttrell Elementary School
- Maynardville Elementary School
- Paulette Elementary School
- Sharps Chapel Elementary School
- Tennessee Virtual Academy
- Union County Alternative Center, grades 6-12
- Union County High School
- In 2023 the Union County High School Baseball team won the first ever team sports State Championship in county history.

== Attractions ==
- Roy Acuff Museum
- Big Ridge State Park

== Communities ==
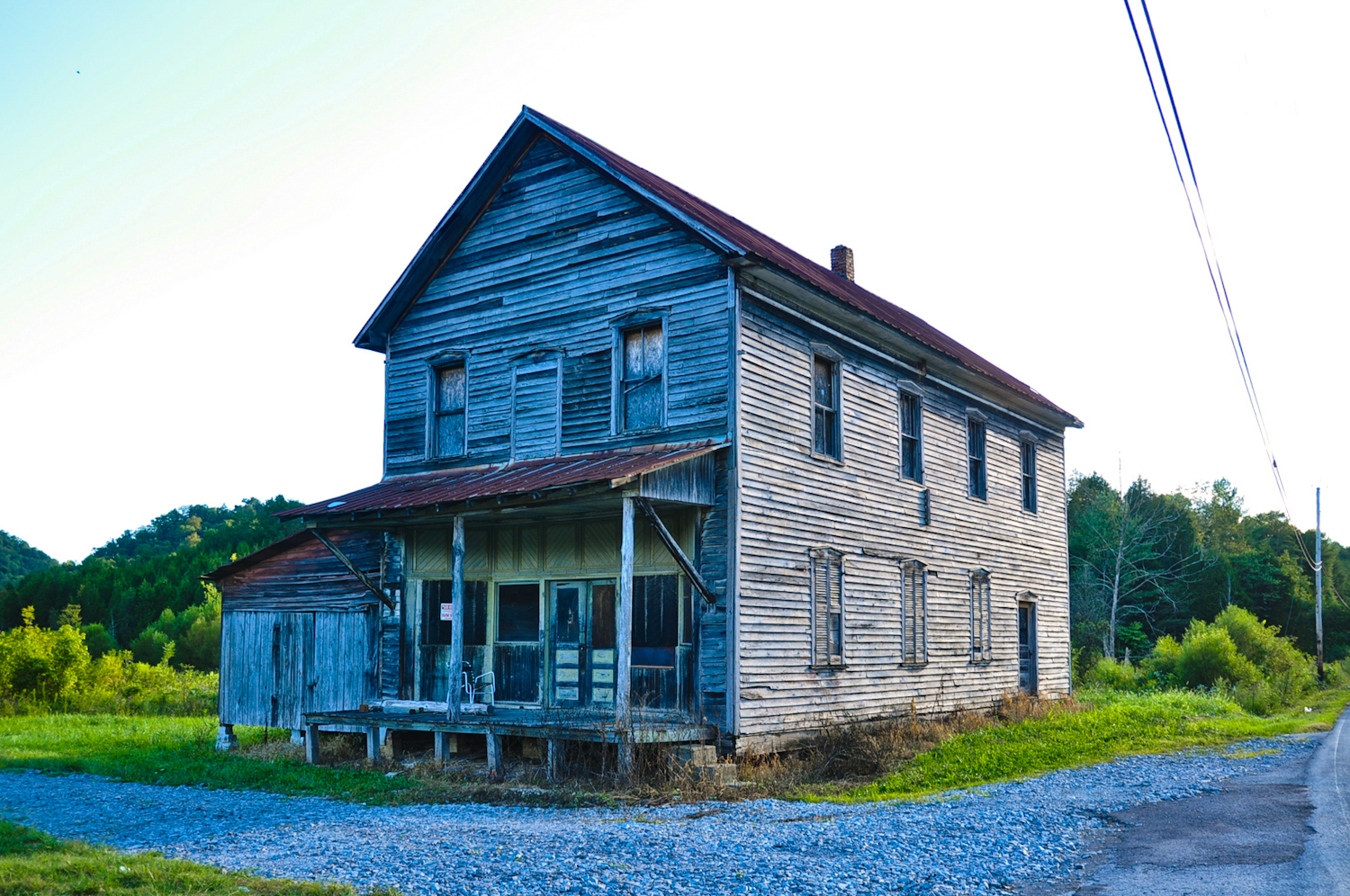
The old Hamilton-Lay store at Hamilton Crossroads, east of Maynardville

=== Cities ===
- Luttrell
- Maynardville (county seat)
- Plainview

=== Unincorporated communities ===
- Alder Springs
- Braden
- Sharps Chapel

=== Ghost town ===
- Loyston

== Notable people ==
- Roy Acuff, entertainer
- Chet Atkins, entertainer
- Jake Butcher, former banker and politician, convicted of fraud
- Kenny Chesney, entertainer
- John Rice Irwin, historian and founder of Museum of Appalachia
- Florence Reece, who wrote the song "Which Side Are You On?", was born in Sharps Chapel in 1900.
- Carl Smith, entertainer

== Government and politics ==
United States presidential election results for Union County, Tennessee
| Year | Republican | | Democratic | | Third party(ies) | |
| Year | No. | % | No. | % | No. | % |
|---|---|---|---|---|---|---|
| 1912 | 307 | 16.05% | 404 | 21.12% | 1,202 | 62.83% |
| 1916 | 1,490 | 79.09% | 389 | 20.65% | 5 | 0.27% |
| 1920 | 2,607 | 85.98% | 423 | 13.95% | 2 | 0.07% |
| 1924 | 1,540 | 78.37% | 368 | 18.73% | 57 | 2.90% |
| 1928 | 1,826 | 83.30% | 360 | 16.42% | 6 | 0.27% |
| 1932 | 1,169 | 58.95% | 802 | 40.44% | 12 | 0.61% |
| 1936 | 1,785 | 64.70% | 963 | 34.90% | 11 | 0.40% |
| 1940 | 1,143 | 62.66% | 673 | 36.90% | 8 | 0.44% |
| 1944 | 1,768 | 73.73% | 627 | 26.15% | 3 | 0.13% |
| 1948 | 1,603 | 74.35% | 513 | 23.79% | 40 | 1.86% |
| 1952 | 2,087 | 75.78% | 667 | 24.22% | 0 | 0.00% |
| 1956 | 2,154 | 79.69% | 535 | 19.79% | 14 | 0.52% |
| 1960 | 2,082 | 75.63% | 652 | 23.68% | 19 | 0.69% |
| 1964 | 1,770 | 61.87% | 1,091 | 38.13% | 0 | 0.00% |
| 1968 | 1,956 | 66.71% | 527 | 17.97% | 449 | 15.31% |
| 1972 | 1,927 | 76.26% | 570 | 22.56% | 30 | 1.19% |
| 1976 | 1,801 | 52.10% | 1,631 | 47.18% | 25 | 0.72% |
| 1980 | 2,453 | 62.09% | 1,435 | 36.32% | 63 | 1.59% |
| 1984 | 2,447 | 61.51% | 1,495 | 37.58% | 36 | 0.90% |
| 1988 | 2,110 | 59.20% | 1,431 | 40.15% | 23 | 0.65% |
| 1992 | 2,274 | 42.47% | 2,478 | 46.28% | 602 | 11.24% |
| 1996 | 2,253 | 44.08% | 2,421 | 47.37% | 437 | 8.55% |
| 2000 | 3,199 | 54.96% | 2,564 | 44.05% | 58 | 1.00% |
| 2004 | 4,145 | 61.77% | 2,524 | 37.62% | 41 | 0.61% |
| 2008 | 4,467 | 69.81% | 1,829 | 28.58% | 103 | 1.61% |
| 2012 | 4,282 | 73.35% | 1,478 | 25.32% | 78 | 1.34% |
| 2016 | 5,053 | 80.89% | 1,012 | 16.20% | 182 | 2.91% |
| 2020 | 6,803 | 83.75% | 1,249 | 15.38% | 71 | 0.87% |
| 2024 | 7,384 | 85.18% | 1,216 | 14.03% | 69 | 0.80% |

Union County's current mayor is Jason Bailey. The county has 17 commissioners, with two-to-three from each of its seven districts.

== See also ==
- National Register of Historic Places listings in Tennessee#Union County
