= Amsterdam, California =

Unincorporated community in California, United States

Amsterdam
- Unincorporated community
- Location in California Amsterdam (the United States)
- Coordinates: 37°25′49″N 120°32′32″W
- Country: United States
- State: California
- County: Merced
- Elevation: 220 ft (67 m)

Amsterdam is an unincorporated community in Merced County, California, United States. It is located 6.5 miles (10 km) north-northeast of Atwater, at an elevation of 220 feet (67 m).

Amsterdam was settled by Dutch immigrants, and had a station on the Southern Pacific branch line to Oakdale, abandoned in 1942. In 1925, Amsterdam was said to have a population of 32. The community was featured in the 2012 Belgian documentary Amsterdam Stories USA on places in the United States named Amsterdam.

A post office operated at Amsterdam from 1893 to 1895, from 1900 to 1910, with a closure during part of 1906, and from 1912 to 1925.
