= Dear My Blank =

Blog on Tumblr

Dear My Blank is a well-known submission based Tumblr blog run by Ohio native Emily Trunko, who created the blog at the age of sixteen. The blog is composed of anonymous or semi-anonymous letters written to people and posted on the website in lieu of sending them to the intended reader. Trunko says that the idea to create the blog came from her own habit of writing letters to people in her life that she didn't intend to send, and that the blog has helped her realize that many of the problems people have, they have in common with others. The blog was created on March 22, 2015, and within the first week had already received 300 submissions. As of June 24, 2015, there were over 3,000 posted submissions. Trunko is also the creator of the Tumblr blog The Last Message received, and has also been written about in many publications including the New York Times, BuzzFeed, and Cosmopolitan magazine.
