= La Brea Woman =

Hominin fossil

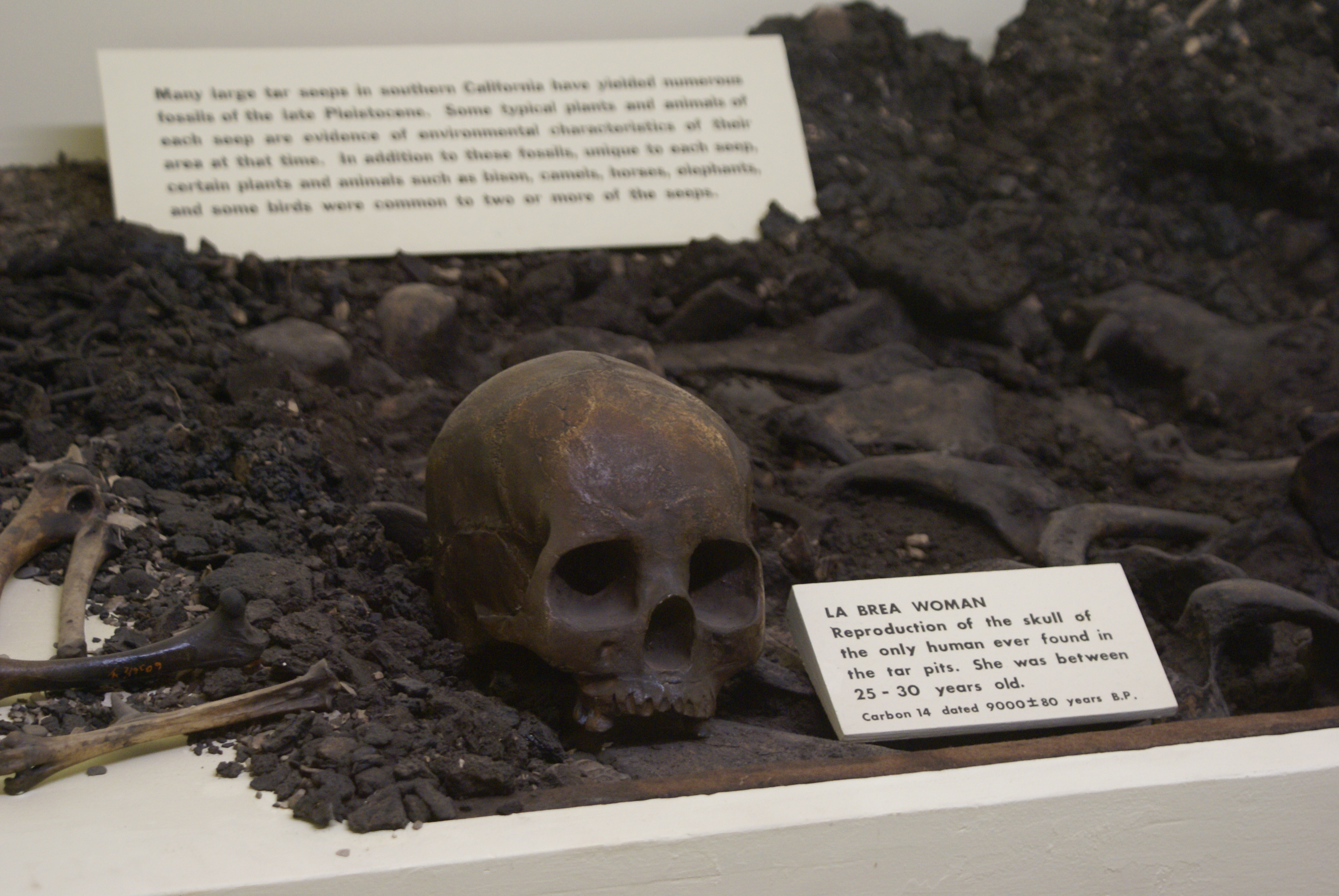
- Replica of the skull of "La Brea Woman" on display, Santa Barbara Museum of Natural History
- Died: c. 8000 BC (aged c. 17-25) now Los Angeles, California, United States
- Body discovered: 1914

The La Brea Woman refers to the only human remains ever excavated from the La Brea Tar Pits in Los Angeles, California. The remains, first discovered in Pit 10 in 1914, are the partial skeleton of a woman. Radiocarbon dating of the bones has estimated an age of 10,220–10,250 years BP (Before Present), during the current Holocene epoch. Her age at death has been estimated between 17 and 25 years.

== Archaeological study ==
Although it is impossible to determine the exact age of the La Brea Woman at the time of her death, researchers estimate that she was about 17–25 years old. This is based upon both her dental work and the fusion stage of several post cranial bones which were recovered. She is theorized to have been about 4 feet, 8–10 inches (1.5 meters) tall. Judging by her dental samples, scientists suggest she ate a diet of stone-ground meal.

There are several theories regarding how the La Brea Woman died and came to be in Pit 10. Until 2016, researchers believed that she may have died elsewhere and been ceremonially reburied in the pit along with a domestic dog, whose bones were found near hers. This theory is no longer prominent, due to radiocarbon dating which proved the dog’s bones were about seven thousand years younger than the woman’s. Another theory is that she may have been the victim of homicide. This is supported by a fracture in her skull which researchers infer was caused by a blow to the head that may have killed her. It is also possible that she fell into the pit accidentally, became entrapped and subsequently died.

== Museum display ==
The remains consisted of a cranium, mandible, and post-cranial remains: a partial scapula, right humerus, radius, ulnar shaft, right femur, left femur, left innominate, a cervical vertebra, and a lumbar vertebra. The radius and left femur were destroyed for radiocarbon dating, but a cast of the femur was present in the museum display. The La Brea Woman’s right femur was stolen when her remains were in transit from the Natural History Museum to the George C. Page Museum. The bones were recovered from Pit 10 at the Rancho La Brea tar pits, from a depth of 2 to 2.7 meters.

These bones used to be on display in the George C. Page Museum, alongside a life-sized model thought to resemble the woman, but the exhibit was removed around 2004. Curator John M. Harris was concerned that this display of historic remains might offend Native Americans or attract unwanted attention to its Native American origins, thereby triggering a demand for their return. According to some researchers, her skull shape indicates that she is ethnically Chumash. However, others claim that this suggestion is "baseless" and that there is not enough information to reliably determine this.

In 2009, California forensic artist Melissa R. Cooper created a facial reconstruction based on her skull. The images resulted in controversy regarding their display in addition to ethical questions about the museum's reason for keeping La Brea Woman in hiding.

== Associated dog remains ==
The La Brea Woman's bones were found in close proximity to the partial cranium and mandible of a domestic dog, which led researches to believe that she had been ceremonially interred. However, in 2016, a study radiocarbon dated the bones of both the woman and the dog, and determined that the dog remains were only around 3,325 years old. This difference of about seven thousand years makes it impossible for them to have been buried at the same time. Additionally, the proximity of one skeleton to another is not substantial evidence for association, because tar pits are dynamic systems which tend to displace and disarticulate remains.

== See also ==
- Angeles Mesa skeletons
- List of human evolution fossils
- List of unsolved deaths
