= Braden, Union County, Tennessee =

Unincorporated community in Tennessee, US

Coordinates: 36°25′03″N 83°52′32″W

Braden is a small unincorporated community in northern Union County, Tennessee.

Braden is a rural community cut off from the rest of Union County by water from Norris Lake; it can only be reached by ferry or by a long drive from Claiborne County.

The community was named for the local Braden family of settlers.
