= Angeles Mesa skeletons =

Partially fossilized human remains found California 1924

Angeles Mesa Skeletons or Haverty Skeletons
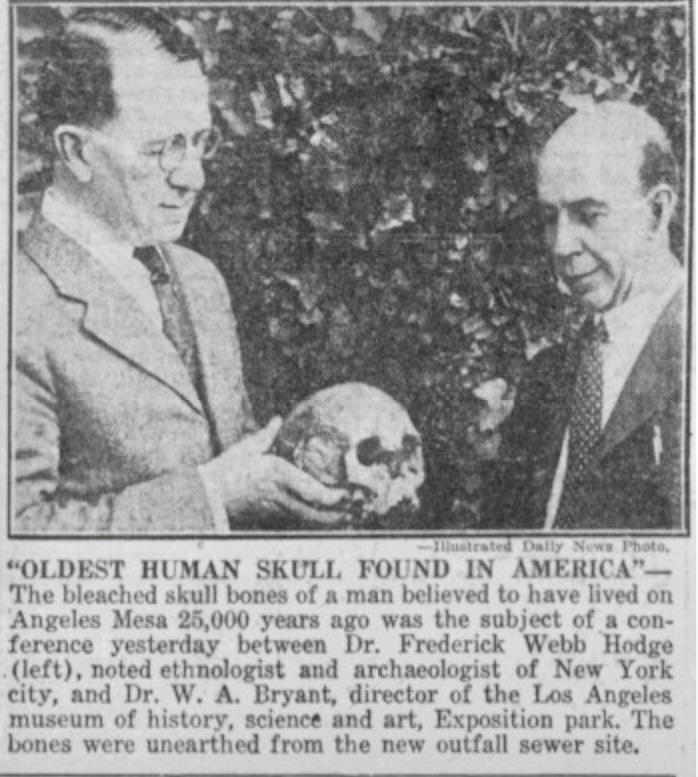
- Frederick Webb Hodge holds skull while William Alanson Bryan looks on, Los Angeles Daily News, August 1924
- Catalog no.: LAN-171
- Common name: Angeles Mesa Skeletons or Haverty Skeletons
- Species: Homo sapiens
- Age: Before 3000 BC
- Place discovered: “Ballona Plain,” Los Angeles, California
- Date discovered: 1924
- Discovered by: George Sherman (Haverty site foreman), George Hess (VP of Haverty Construction), Chester Stock, W.A. Bryan, et al.

Angeles Mesa Skeletons or Haverty Skeletons are two common names for permineralized prehistoric human remains comprising eight individuals (three males, three females, two individuals of uncertain sex) that were found in loose sands and sandy clays at the base of the Baldwin Hills between Culver City and Los Angeles in Southern California in 1924. Angeles Mesa is the neighborhood where they were found; Haverty Construction Company was the business that initially uncovered the site.

“Several of these individuals are represented by nearly complete cranial and post-cranial materials, an extremely rare occurrence in pre-contact Native American remains,” noted a 2013 summary of the decades-long effort to determine the age of the bones. They likely date from before 3000 BC.

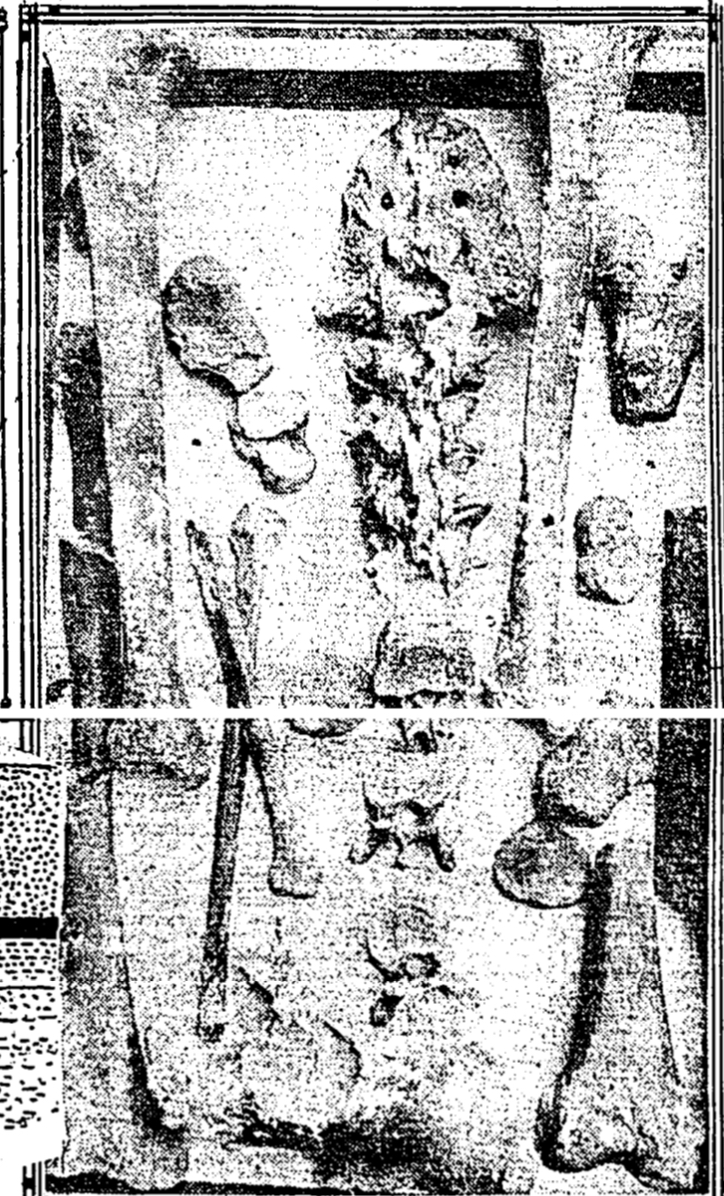
Angeles Mesa bones, Los Angeles Times

== Discovery and initial reports ==
On March 24, 1924, the Stockton Independent retold the story of the initial find by an unnamed laborer:

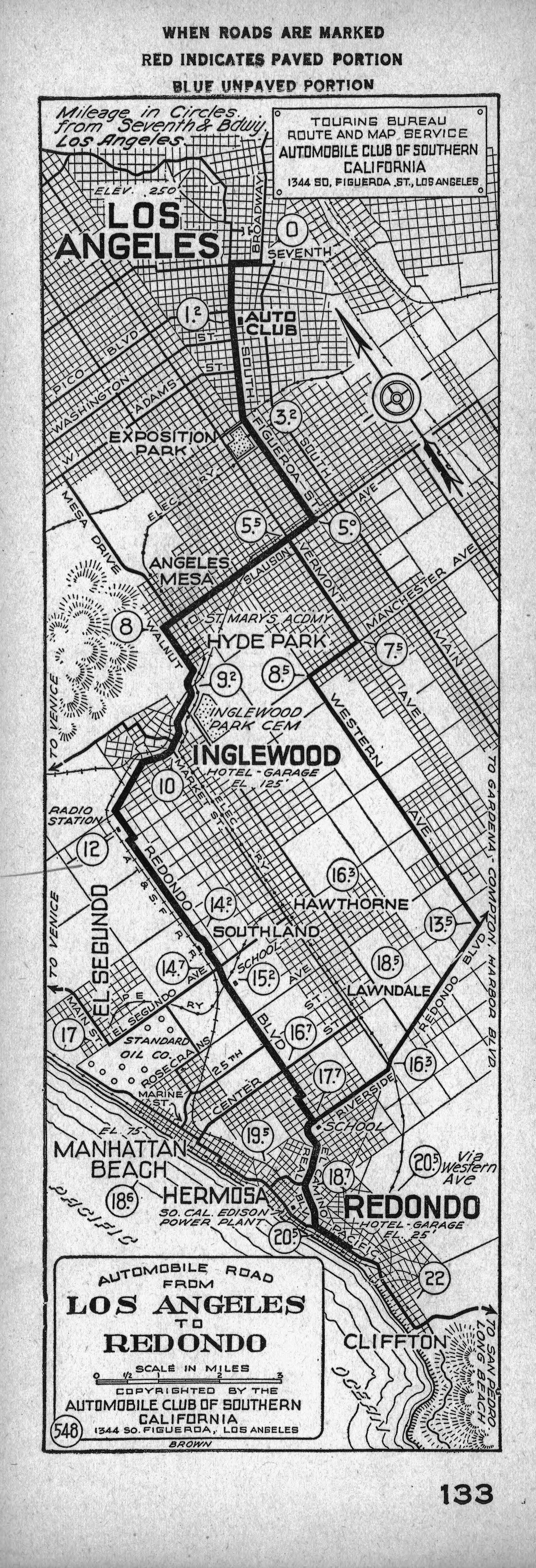
AAA road map from 1921 shows location of Angeles Mesa, railway, etc.

L.A. Mexican Locates Prehistoric Skull To Puzzle U.S. Scientists ¶ LOS ANGELES, March 23. ¶ An ape-like skull unearthed and cast aside by excavators for an outfall sewer near here several days ago, today was being studied by paleontologists as possibly the most ancient relic of man yet brought to light by the research of scientists. The Mexican workman whose shovel encountered the skull at a depth of 23 ft (7.0 m) in what geologists described as glacerial [sic] sands beneath pleistocine [sic] clay strata, not being particularly impressed with his find, tossed it, out upon a heap of sand and gravel and forgot about it. His foreman, however, thought the cranium might be of interest to one of his employers who had confessed enthusiasm for paleontological research. This man in turn passed the find on to scientists at the museum of history and art here, which Institution will undertake further excavations In an effort to unearth other portions of the prehistoric skeleton, it possible. “We are not prepared to make any definite statement In regard to this discovery as yet,” said Dr. A.J. Tieje, head of the museum’s geological department. “It was submitted to Dr. John Merriam, president of the Carnegie Institution of Washington, D.C., who was much interested but did not have time to make a thorough examination.

On March 25, 1924, the Los Angeles Daily News reported:

3 More Prehistoric Skeletons Unearthed ¶ Three skeletons, similar to the one unearthed last week, were found yesterday, one half-mile west of Angeles Mesa drive near the Pacific Electric line to Santa Monica, while excavating a new outfall sewer, according to an officer of the Thomas Haverty company, excavators. Scientists say the bones art [sic] are at least 10,000 or 20,000 years old. ¶ All four skeletons are at the Museum of History, Science and Art at Exposition Park.

On March 28, 1924, the San Luis Obispo Tribune published a four-day-old story with a March 24 dateline:

Second Prehistoric Skull Is Found in Los Angeles ¶ A second skull of prehistoric man, possibly 25,000 years old, was uncovered today by laborers digging excavations in the western part of the city, at West Vernon Avenue and Messer [sic? Mesa?] drive. ¶ Dr. Lester [sic] Stock, prominent scientist of the University of California, who was called here on the occasion of the finding of the first skull several days ago, was present when the second skull was found today.

A March 27 report credited to the United Press that appeared in at least two California papers suggested that the bones belonged to a “pygmy” because the vertebrate and ribs were very small. Nearby prehistoric camel bones were mentioned.

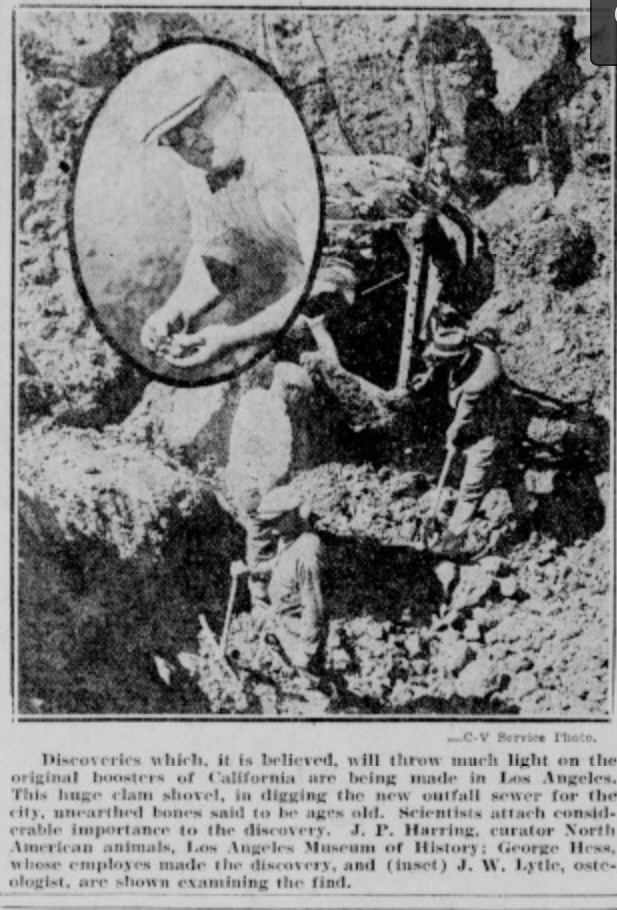
Angeles Mesa/Haverty excavation photo from newspaper wire service, published March 28

On April 11, in a column of the La Jolla Light and La Jolla Journal that was headlined Scripps Institution Notes, it was reported that:

At the invitation of Dr. Bryan, Director of the Los Angeles Museum, Dr. Vaughan joined in a conference last Sunday to consider the geological occurrence of the human remains recently found north of the Baldwin Hills. Other scientists attending the conference on invitation were Messrs. R. T. Hill, H. S. Gale, W. S. W. Kek, Chester Stock, and Mr. Tieje. Although the human skeletons seemed to represent modern man, the depth to which they had been buried indicates considerable antiquity, measured by the human scale. Geologically they are regarded as Recent, perhaps as much as 10,000 years old or somewhat older.”

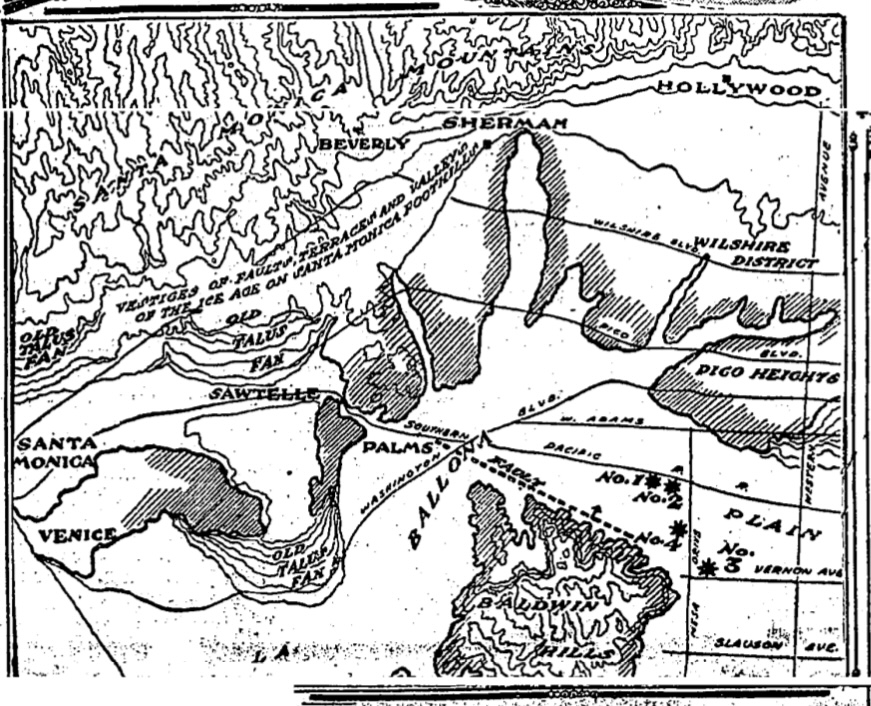
Angeles Mesa skeleton / Haverty bones discovery sites marked with stars (Los Angeles Times, 1924)

According to a full-page April 1924 report in the Los Angeles Times, the skeletons were found 20 to 24 feet below the surface “just west of the intersection of the Santa Monica Air Line Railway and Mesa Drive” between West Adams Boulevard and Vernon Avenue in southwestern Los Angeles.

Chester Stock clarified in the Science paper that what Hill calls Mesa was Angeles Mesa Drive. Angeles Mesa Drive was later renamed Crenshaw Boulevard, and the Air Line became Exposition Boulevard what is now the E Line, so Stock is describing the intersection where Expo/Crenshaw station sits now. Following Stock’s measurements, the bones were found under the block now bounded by Obama Boulevard, West Boulevard, Coliseum Street, and Buckingham Road. However, Hill’s map published in the Los Angeles Times puts one of the four locations at Mesa and Vernon, which (if he means today’s Crenshaw Blvd. and Vernon Ave.) is some 1.7 mi (2.7 km) from the location described in Stock’s paper. Crenshaw and Vernon is essentially today’s Leimert Park Plaza. The distance from Expo/Crenshaw to Leimert Park Plaza is 1.5 mi (2.4 km).

Geologist Robert T. Hill examined the excavation site and reported, “All precedents regarding the nature of the deposits in which they were found suggests that they are many thousands of years old.” He sent the following telegram to Henry F. Osborn:

”Human remains found here completely fossilized. Occur twenty-five feet deep in horizontal stratified of old recent or latest Pleistocene age. No possibility of intrusion or confusion with outwash or Santa Barbara occurrence. Consider most unquestionable ancient occurrence yet reported. Material well cared-for by Bryan and Stock.”

A photo included with the April 6, 1924 report in the L.A. Times shows vertebrae and limb bones, et al.

Chester Stock wrote a paper that was read at an April 29, 1924, meeting of the National Academy of Sciences and printed in the issue of Science dated July 4, 1924. He reported that “at least six individuals…were found in an area of not more than 12 sq ft (1.1 m^{2}).” A 1955 paper on Southern California human archaeology, seemingly relying on Stock (1924) says, “The osseous material was not scattered, all coming from an area of not more than 12 square feet.” This conflicts with initial newspaper reports and Hill’s map, which show material spread over a distance of nearly 2 mi (3.2 km). In fact it is almost the exact same distance as between the Angeles Mesa/Haverty site (Obama & West) and the 1936 Los Angeles Man find (Obama & La Cienega) as mapped on page 62 of Brooks (1990).

At the time of discovery, Hill called these bones “Los Angeles Man” but that common name was also later (and more permanently) applied to prehistoric human remains found by a WPA crew in 1936.

The remains were found with “a bone awl fragment, a quartzite core tool, and some freshwater gastropods.”

== Later analysis and dating attempts ==
A 1948 bibliography from the Berkeley Dept. of Anthropology reported, “Remains of six skeletons” (with no accompanying vertebrate animals) were found 19 to 23 feet below the surface. “The dating of the human remains is uncertain, though they are almost certainly ancient. A full report on the stratification, skeletons and few artifacts has not yet appeared. The remains are in the Los Angeles County Museum in Exposition Park.” The bibliographer quotes a 1937 book Environment, Race, and Migration by one G. Taylor that states that the Angeles Mesa finds “seem to date from Interglacial times.”

According to Brooks (1990), “In 1961, the Haverty skeletons, records, newspaper accounts, and related photographs were transferred from LAMSA to the Department of Anthropology, University of Southern California.”

Later methods of dating yielded a very wide range of results suggesting that the remains were anywhere from 5,000 to 50,000 years old.

As reported in the journal Radiocarbon in 1983:

“In 1924, a group of human skeletons were found between 5.76 and 7 m deep in a area ca 1 m^{2} during trenching operations being carried out by the Haverty Construction Company in the Baldwin Hills area of western Los Angeles, California (Stock, 1924). The horizontal proximity of the skeletons strongly suggest that all of the skeletons were interred at the same time. Interest in the age of the Haverty or Angeles Mesa Skeletons was heightened by the 1970 determination on the Los Angeles (Baldwin Hills) human skeleton which was recovered in 1936 ca 0.8 km north of Haverty at a depth of 4m (Lopatin, 1940; G Kennedy, pers commun). Its ^{14}C age, >23,600 years BP, was obtained on the total amino acid fraction of a portion of the skull (Bergeretal, 1971; Berger, 1975). Subsequently, a D/L aspartic acid racemization value of 26,000 years was obtained using the C-dated Laguna human skull to provide the temperature calibration (Bada and Helfman, 1975). With the same temperature calibration, an aspartic acid measurement on the Haverty skeleton resulted in an inferred age of greater than 50,000 years (Austin, 1976, p. 5; Masters, pers commun). By contrast, the four ^{14}C determinations on the Haverty skeletons by the radiocarbon laboratories point to a middle Holocene age in the range between ca 5,000 and 8,000 ^{14}C years”.

A further radiocarbon test of one of the bones by UCLA was reported in Radiocarbon in 1989, with a conclusion that they were between 8,500 and 12,500 years old:

UCLA-1924. Angeles Mesa 10,500±2000 Femur marked 3 from Angeles Mesa skeletons thought to be of Early Man age. To remove possible surface contamination, bone was extracted for 10 days continuously with 1:1 ethyl ether/ethyl alcohol combination in Soxhelt apparatus and then dried at 10°C for 24 hr. Subm by L Crum and G Kennedy, UCLA. Comment (LC & GK) date confirms our age estimate.

A 1997 analysis asserts that the skeletons are 4,000 to 5,000 years old.

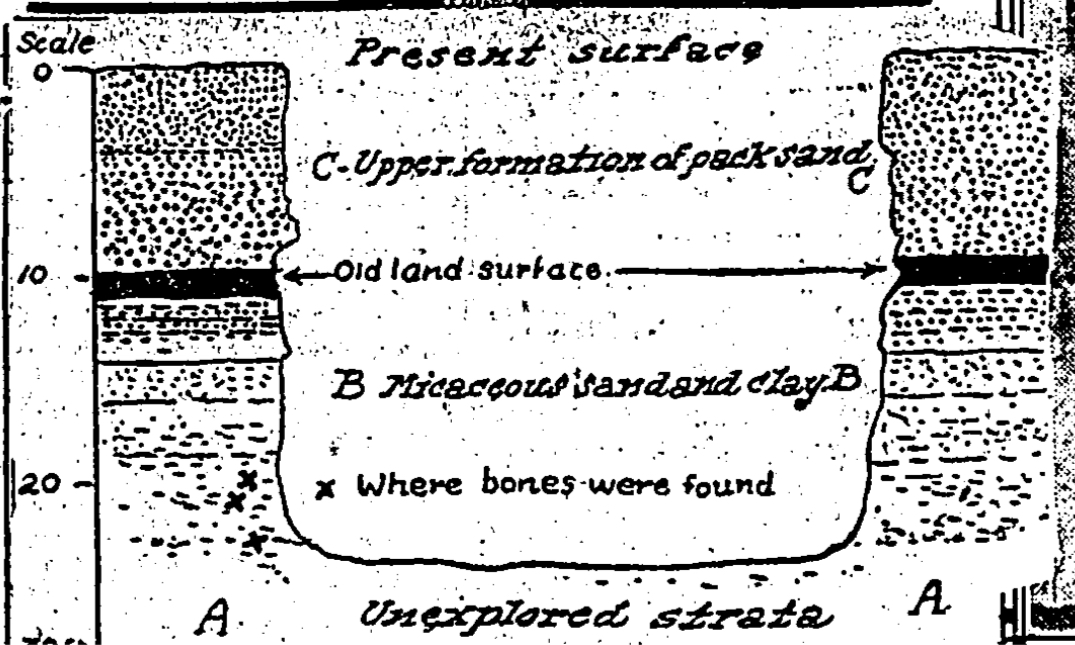
Illustration of strata excavation for Angeles Mesa bones (Los Angeles Times, 1924)

A book on the history of radiocarbon dating noted of the wildly varying age estimates that “The view that the Haverty skeletons are all essentially the same age may be in error.”

If the bones are 7,000-4,000 BP that would place them in the Milling Stone period of California history; if they date to more than 7,000 years before 1950 they would be assigned to the Paleocoastal period. According to a 2018 archeological report, “Some of the oldest human skeletons found in the Americas were discovered at the Haverty Site…A more recent study of the Haverty skeletons concludes that at least some of the skeletons may be of 'terminal Pleistocene age.'”

”Back of the whole subject, however, as in every science, is the misty beginning, and no one yet knows but that prior to the American Indian imported from Asia, there may have been American indigene, the discovery of which may someday be sprung on us just as were the unsuspected animal fauna of La Brea, and knowledge of the wonderful Cro-Magnon race of Europe in the caverns of Altamira in Spain were but recently suddenly and unexpectedly revealed.”

— Robert T. Hill (1924)

== See also ==
- La Brea Woman
- History of the west coast of North America
- Paleoindian
- Archaic period (North America)
- Archaeology of the Americas
