= Angeles Mesa Branch Library =

- Angeles Mesa Branch
- U.S. National Register of Historic Places
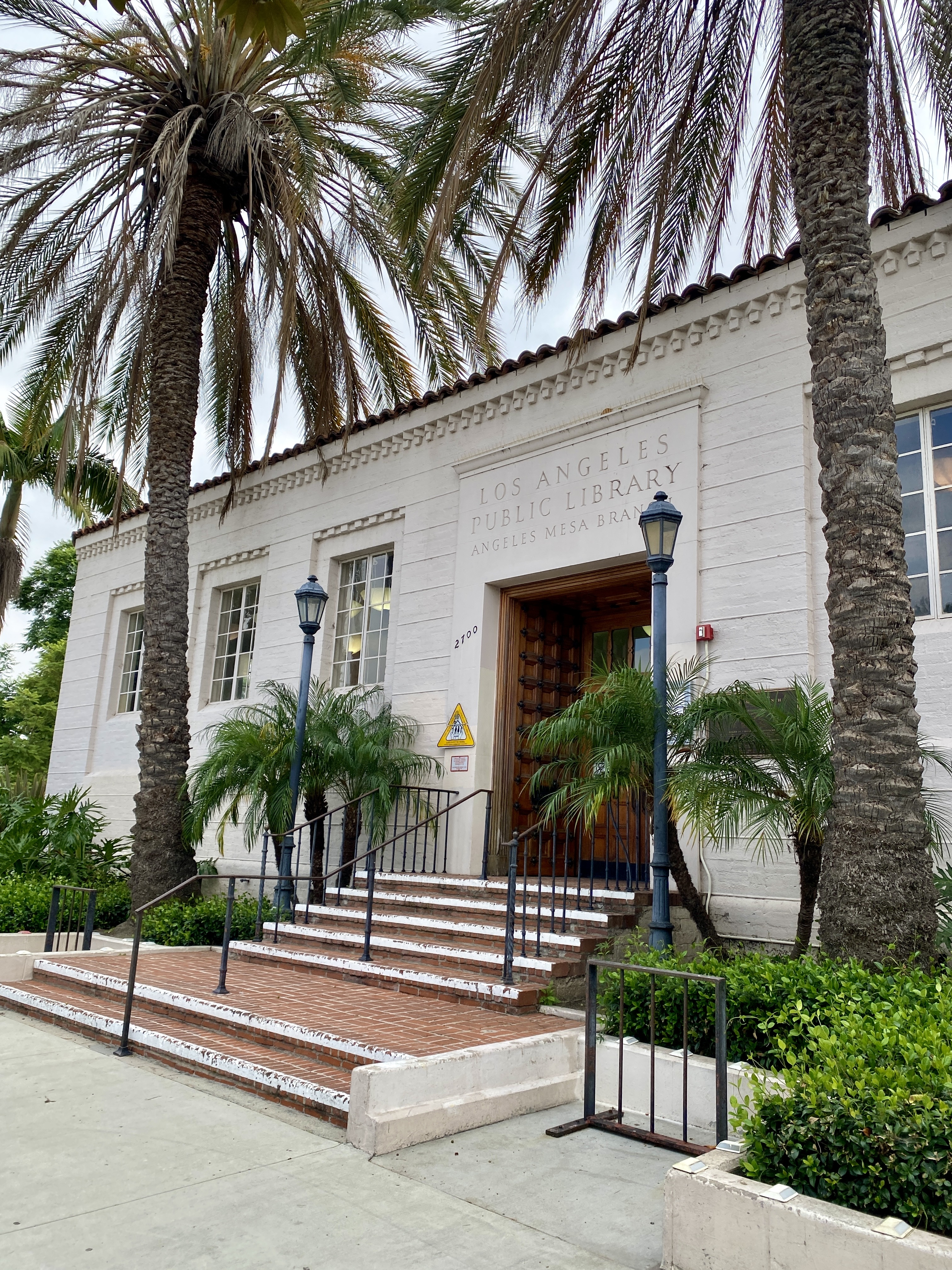
- Angeles Mesa Branch, 2023

- Location within the Los Angeles metropolitan area Location within California Location within the United States
- Location: 2700 W. 52nd St., Los Angeles, California
- Coordinates: 33°59′41″N 118°19′20″W
- Built: 1929
- Architect: Royal Dana
- Architectural style: Spanish Colonial Revival, Late 19th And 20th Century Revivals
- MPS: Los Angeles Branch Library System
- NRHP reference No.: 87001005
- Added to NRHP: May 19, 1987

Angeles Mesa Branch Library is a branch library of the Los Angeles Public Library in the Angeles Mesa neighborhood of Los Angeles. It was built in the late 1920s based on a Spanish Colonial Revival style design by architect Royal Dana. The building was dedicated and opened to the public on October 9, 1928, and cost about $35,000 to build and furnish.

In 1987, the Angeles Mesa Branch and several other branch libraries in Los Angeles were added to the National Register of Historic Places as part of a thematic group submission.

== See also ==
- List of Registered Historic Places in Los Angeles
- Los Angeles Public Library
