= Alder Springs, Union County, Tennessee =

Unincorporated community in Tennessee, US

Coordinates: 36°14′17″N 83°51′53″W

Alder Springs is an unincorporated community in Union County, Tennessee, in the United States.

The community was named after the abundant hazel alder in a nearby swamp.
