= Angeles Mesa, Los Angeles =

Angeles Mesa
- Neighborhood
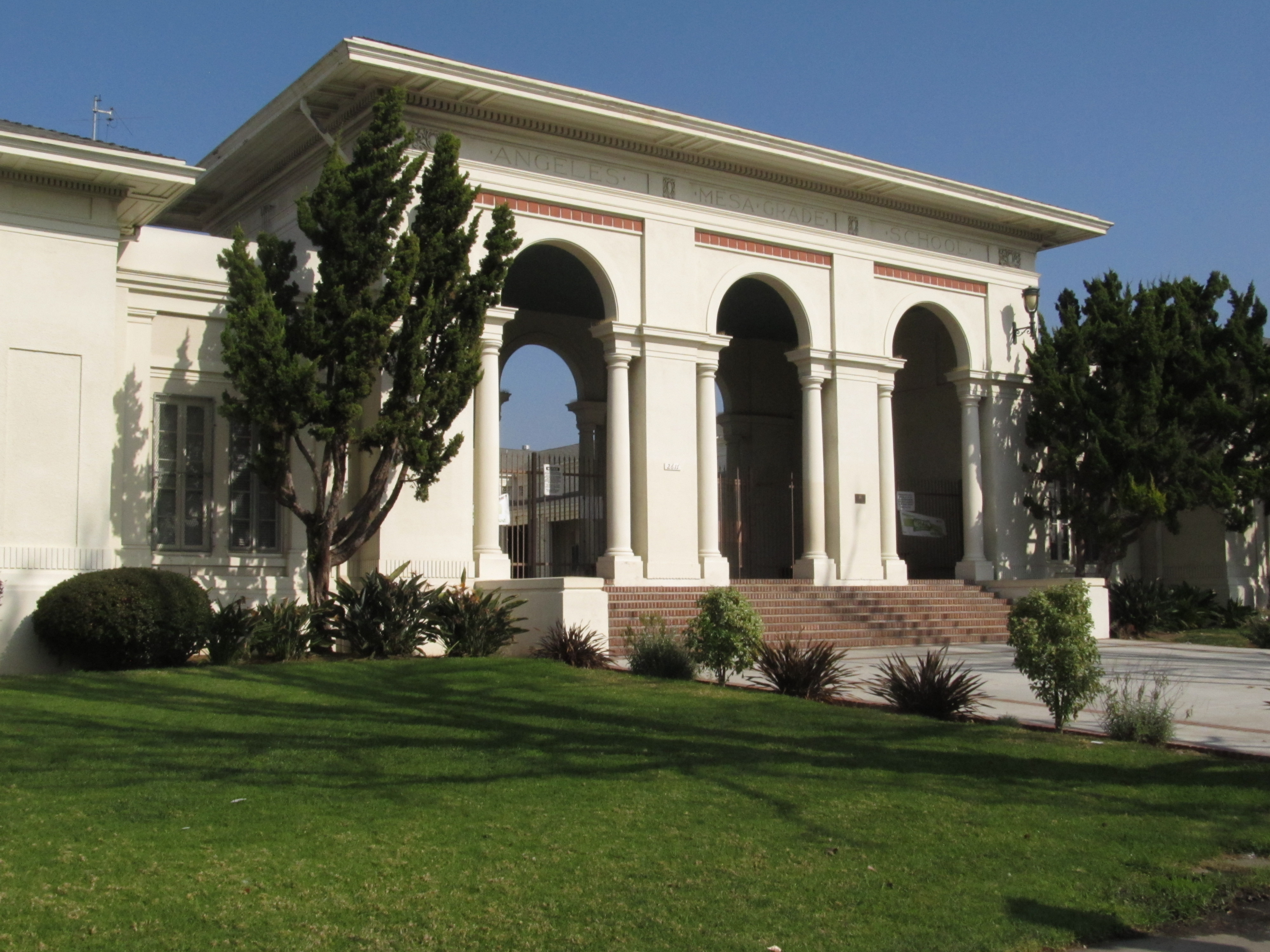
- Angeles Mesa Elementary School

- Location in relation to Central Los Angeles
- Coordinates: 33.9942°N 118.3136°W
- Country: United States
- State: California
- County: Los Angeles
- Time zone: Pacific
- Zip Code: 90037, 90043
- Area code: 323

Angeles Mesa is a neighborhood in South Los Angeles, California.

== Geography ==
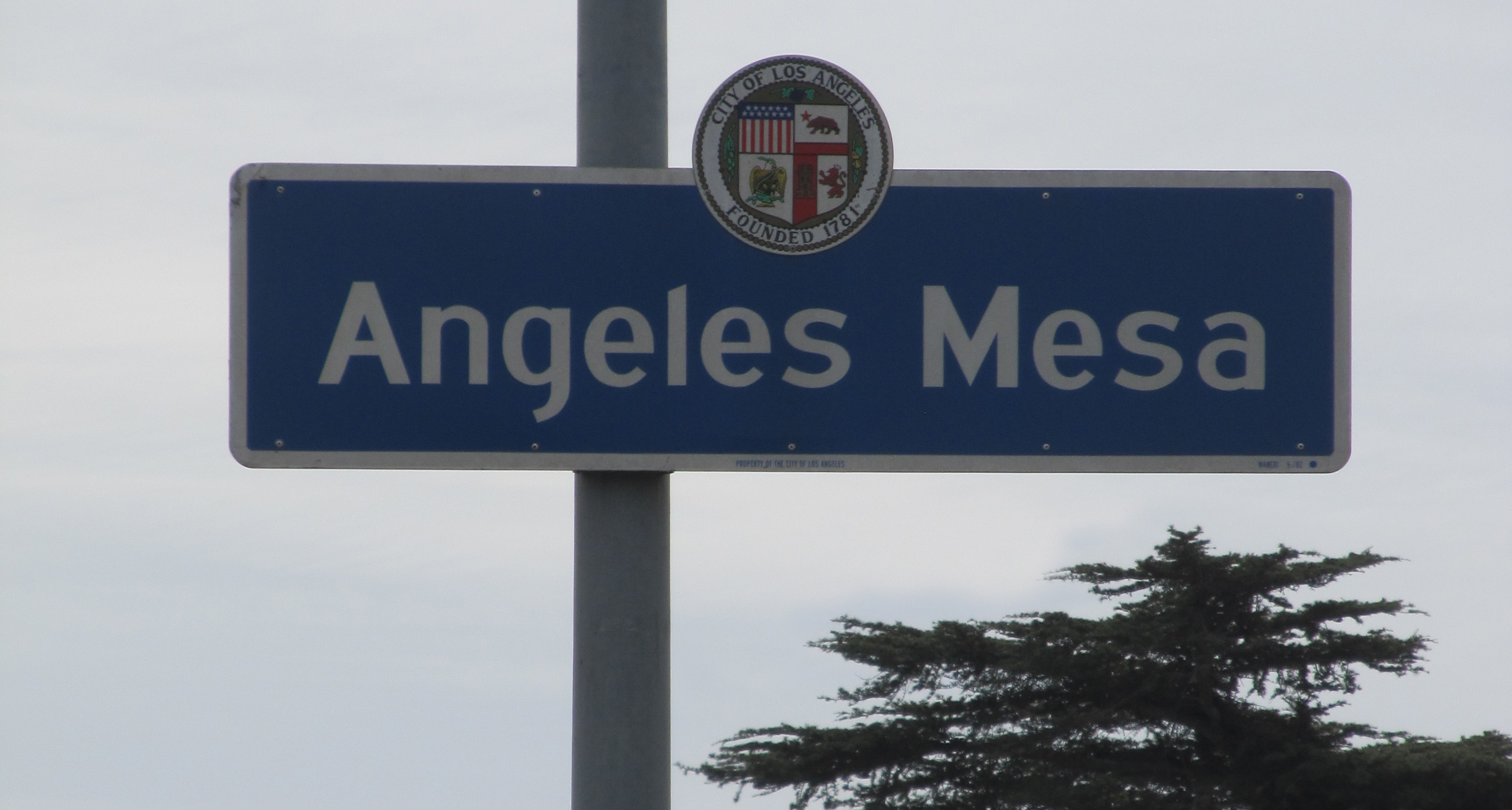
LA neighborhood sign for Angeles Mesa

By city council action in October 2001 (C.F. #01-1874), "Angeles Mesa" was officially named and designated.

The Department of Transportation was instructed to install neighborhood signs on 54th Street at 11th Avenue, 54th Street at 2nd Avenue, Van Ness Avenue at 48th Street and Crenshaw Boulevard at 54th Street.

In 2008, the city approved the Chesterfield Square/Angeles Mesa Gateway Median Sign Project. The Angeles Mesa median sign is located on Arlington Avenue on the north side of 54th Street.

The neighborhood of Chesterfield Square is located south of 54th Street.

The neighborhood is served by the Park Mesa Heights Community Council, which covers Hyde Park, Angeles Mesa and View Heights.

== History ==
North is at the top of this map from the Los Angeles Times, August 20, 1916. Angeles Mesa touches the Baldwin Hills on the west and flanks Western Avenue on the east. St. Mary’s Academy is south of it across Slauson Avenue. The “Proposed Road” (signaled by an arrow) and Mesa Drive are now part of Crenshaw Boulevard. The curved line (now Leimert Avenue) marks the Los Angeles Railway Hawthorne tracks, running on Santa Barbara Avenue (now Martin Luther King Drive), joining Mesa Drive, and continuing to Inglewood, at bottom left. A Santa Fe Railroad track runs northeast-southwest through Hyde Park. Southwest from Mesa Drive lies a paved boulevard (now Florence Avenue) to Redondo Beach. Manchester Avenue (now Boulevard) is at the bottom.

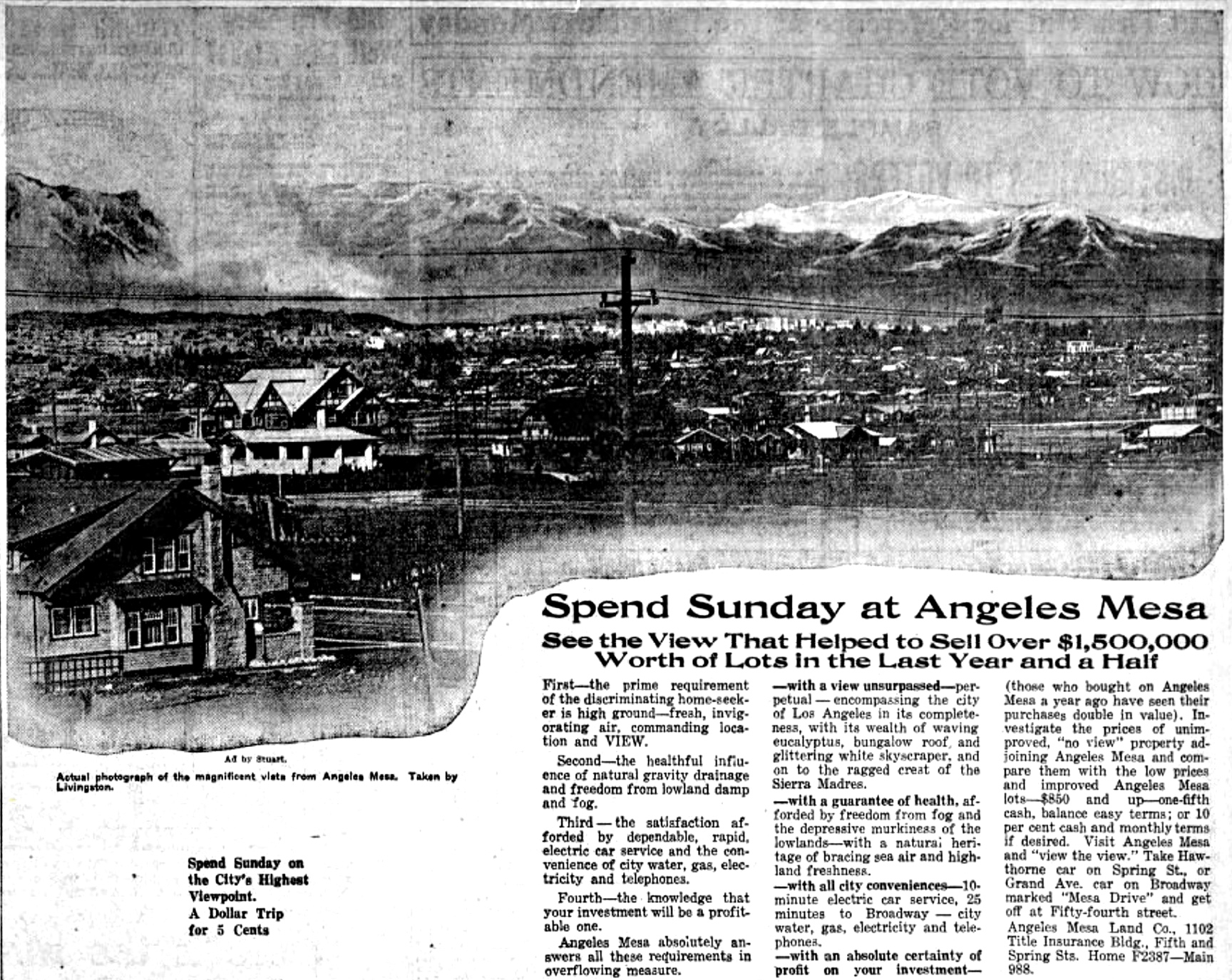
Advertisement from the Los Angeles Evening Herald of March 22, 1913, stressing the clarity of the view in the Angeles Mesa tract. Downtown Los Angeles is in the distance in the center, Mt. Baldy can be seen on the horizon, and there appears to be a brush fire at the top left.

=== Development ===
The Angeles Mesa Land Company was incorporated in 1904 with a capital stock of $100,000. The investors were George S. Safford Sr., president; Robert Wankowski, E.G. Howard, Frank R. Rule and Fred W. Forrester. E.A. Forrester & Sons was the agent for the land company.

It was a subdivision of the 400-acre (160 ha) Joughlin Tract on Slauson Avenue, comprising 2,000 lots, or 99 city blocks, said to be the largest single tract ever placed on the market in Los Angeles. (The figures were later publicized as 440 acres (180 ha) and 88 city blocks.) The company forbade any billboards from being erected. It identified the property as "on the first decided rise south of West Adams street hill, . . . a fine, smooth piece of tableland which will require little grading." A water belt underlay the entire tract.

A 1910 news release said:

The subdivision is purely for residences, and . . . no unsightly business stands in struggling one-story shacks, such as mar even some of the most exclusive neighborhoods, can ever possibly find a foothold in this fastidious suburb. A building on the casino (pavilion) order will centralize all business, and house the company's offices, as well as the butcher, the baker, and the candlestick maker.

By 1916, the community had "10 stores, an apartment hotel with accommodations for 20 people and a high class motion picture theater in course of construction."

In that same year, a community celebration, with a torchlight parade, a brass band, "gaily decorated automobiles" and fireworks, was held to commemorate the installation of two hundred ornamental street lights, "set on marbleite pillars." Rubie Henrionnet was selected to reign over the festivities as queen of the carnival.

=== Water and annexation ===
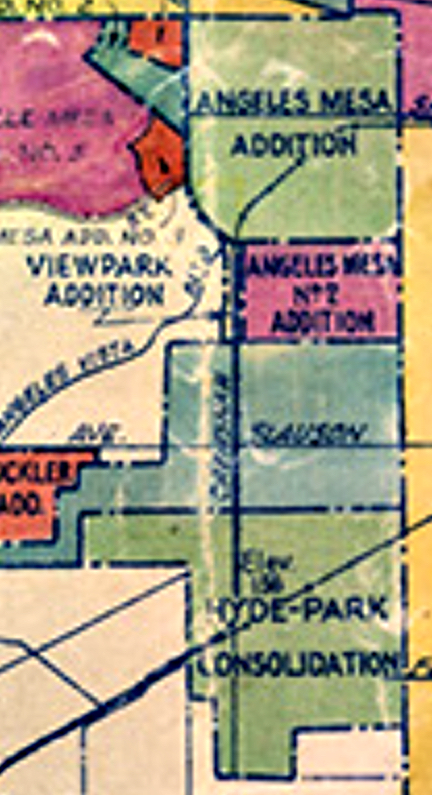
Three annexations of Angeles Mesa areas to Los Angeles are noted, at top, as is the small annexation of the View Park residential tract. The city of Hyde Park, which was consolidated with Los Angeles, is at the bottom of this City of Los Angeles map.

The community lay "just outside the [Los Angeles] city limits" when its first lots went on sale. By 1916, it had its own fire department, under Chief S.O. Ritchey.

Angeles Mesa's water supply came from Inglewood, so residents petitioned the City of Los Angeles to provide service instead. In August 1916, the Los Angeles Public Service Commission decided to take no action because "of a large annexation movement" in unincorporated territory to the west of the then-current Los Angeles city boundary.

Angeles Mesa voters favored annexation of their unincorporated area by Los Angeles in an election held on April 6, 1917, by a vote of 237 to 200.

A month later, the Business Men's Committee of Angeles Mesa, headed by Fred W. Forrester, campaigned in favor of a large annexation into the city of Los Angeles stretching from Angeles Mesa on the northeast to the coastal Los Angeles sewage-treatment plant at Hyperion on the southwest, adjoining El Segundo. Proponents said that any increase in property tax would be more than offset by a decrease in water rates. According to the Evening Express, Forrester stated it was "of vital importance" that the entire area, with its two thousand residents, be annexed to forestall "at any point down the line [being] converted into a small municipality."

The West Coast Annexation area of 7,200 acres (2,900 ha), including the southern part of Angeles Vista, was admitted into Los Angeles in a citywide vote of 49,556 in favor and 26,241 opposed on June 5, 1917.

On July 29, 1919, Angeles Mesa rejected a proposal to buy the Inglewood Water Company's system at a cost of $80,000 and turn it over to the city of Los Angeles after annexation. The vote was 127 in favor and 103 against, with two-thirds needed for passage.

Angeles Mesa voters approved a separate annexation to Los Angeles north of 54th Street on July 21, 1922, by a vote of 174-149. The need for water was given as a reason.

=== Transportation and streets ===
The first subdivision was served by the "Inglewood branch of L.A. & Redondo Electric Railway, and get off at branch office, corner of Slauson Avenue."

E.A. Forrester & Sons announced in August 1910 that it would dedicate a "public park on each side of the Inglewood-Redondo car line, half a mile long, which will be improved with lawns, flower beds and all kinds of ornamental and flowering shrubbery."

Until the 1950s, tracks for the 5 Line streetcar line ran in the median strip along Crenshaw Boulevard between Leimert Boulevard on the north close to Florence Ave on the south. Since the abandonment of the streetcars, the former railway median has been narrowed, the driving lanes improved and the street reconfigured for automobiles, buses and trucks.

The southern end of Crenshaw Boulevard was at Adams Street until 1916-1918, when the road was extended between Adams on the north and Slauson Avenue on the south. The extension saved three miles (4.8 km) in travel over the nearest through road (Western Avenue) and five miles (8.0 km) over the nearest paved road (Vermont Avenue).

== Education ==
=== Construction ===
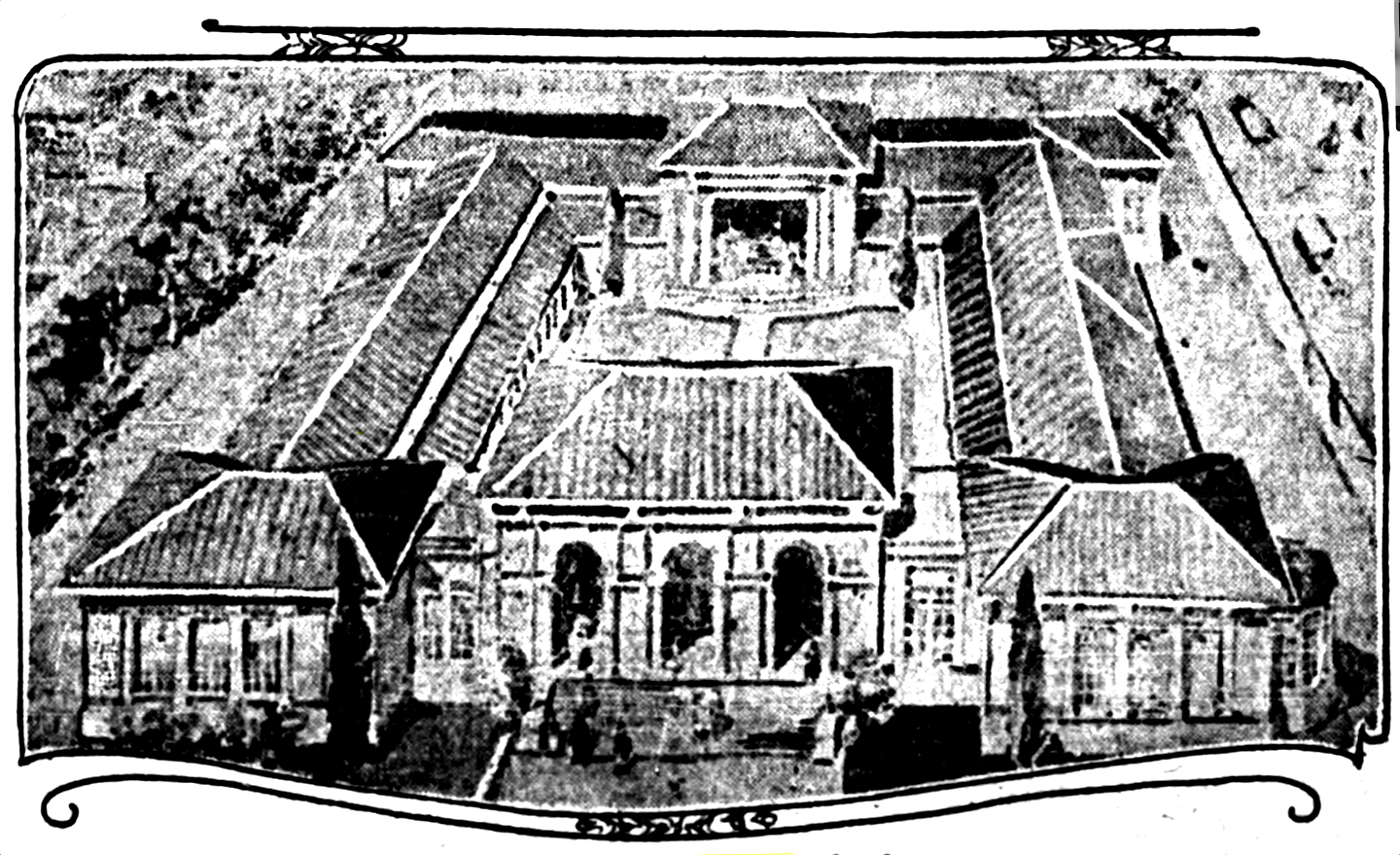
Artist's conception of the Angeles Mesa Elementary School while it was being built, 1915, from the Los Angeles Times

Angeles Mesa Elementary School was completed in 1917 at 2611 W. 52nd Street by the Hyde Park Board of School Trustees, which had to take over construction after the builder failed to fulfill his contract.

At that time, Angeles Mesa and Hyde Park were in the same local school district. All three of the trustees lived in Hyde Park. In 1915, district voters approved a $100,000 bond issue to build a $60,000 school in Hyde Park and a $40,000 campus in Angeles Mesa.

The funds available were not sufficient to complete the Angeles Mesa school, so another bond election was held. The Times reported: "Hyde Park voted solidly against the bonds — 119 to 1 — while Angeles Mesa mustered eighty-nine votes for and five against."

With the bond election lost, a school building less than half completed and no way to complete it, school opening next week and nowhere, except in an overcrowded and temporary frame building to house the children, Angeles Mesa does not know exactly what to do about it. There are over 100 children to be provided for.

The solution was for the school trustees to take "personal charge of the building, buying materials and hiring labor, and deducting the cost from the original contract price."

In June 1916, a campaign for $20,000 in bonds succeeded, by a vote of 339 to 113. Angeles Mesa's votes in favor, 332-2, overwhelmed Hyde Park's votes against, 7-111. Angeles Mesa residents celebrated with "music and fireworks," saying they had already spent so much "for street, light and water improvements that they were willing to wait a year for a new school."

Graduation exercises were finally held on May 31, 1917, in the new school auditorium as construction drew to a close. By that time, Angeles Mesa had a representative on the school board, Henry M. Lannan, who told the gathering that his time on the board had been "very unpleasant."

=== Description ===
A 1915 description of the structure read:

The building is 170x194 feet in size, the classrooms being grouped around an open court with a large entrance loggia in front and an auditorium in the rear, seating 500. There are to be rooms for manual training, domestic science, kindergarten, principal's and teachers' rooms, restroom, lunchroom and sickroom. . . . The stage opens both back and front, so that the court can be used as an open-air theater.

In 1978, a Los Angeles Times reporter wrote that the school's "broad grass yard and airy American Colonial architecture make it one of the prettier schools" in the Los Angeles Unified School District.

=== Desegregation busing ===
In 1963, a lawsuit, Crawford v. Board of Education of the City of Los Angeles, was filed to end segregation in the Los Angeles Unified School District. The California Supreme Court required the district to come up with a desegregation busing plan in 1977. The board returned to court with what the court of appeal described as "one of if not the most drastic plan of mandatory student reassignment in the nation". A desegregation plan was developed, to be implemented in the 1978 school year.

On the first day of the Los Angeles plan in 1978, one hundred white children from Serrania Avenue School in Woodland Hills in the San Fernando Valley were expected at Angeles Mesa School, which was predominately black, but only nineteen arrived. On the second day, Angeles Mesa sent 58 of 71 eligible children the "relatively long distance" to Serrania Avenue School. It was a one-hour ride from one school to another.

California Constitutional Proposition 1 was passed by state voters in 1979. The Crawford v. Board of Education of the City of Los Angeles lawsuit was heard in the Supreme Court in 1982. The Supreme Court upheld the decision that Proposition 1 was constitutional, and that, therefore, mandatory busing was not permissible.

== Buildings ==
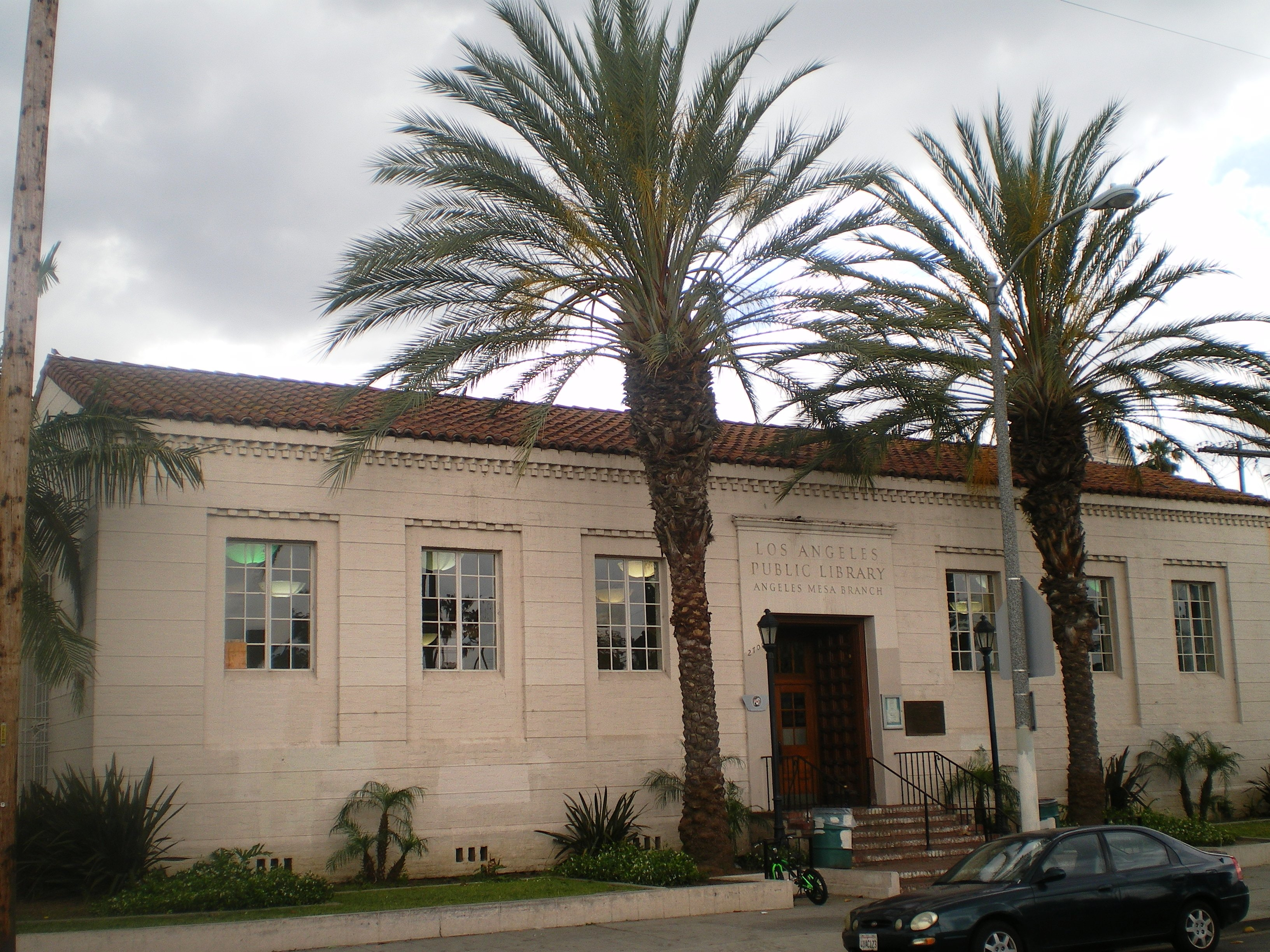
Angeles Mesa Branch Library

=== Mesa Theater ===
The Mesa Theater at 5807 Crenshaw Boulevard was opened on April 21, 1926, with motion picture actors Gertrude Astor, Junior Coghlan, Ethel Gray Terry, Helene Chadwick, Grace Gordon, and Vera Gordon in attendance. Lew Cody was the master of ceremonies. It was closed in September 1963. A fire damaged the theatre in 1964 and it was razed the next year.

=== Library ===
The Angeles Mesa branch library, L.A.P.L., 2700 W 52nd St, Los Angeles, CA 90043, was built in the late 1920s based on a Spanish Colonial Revival style design by architect Royal Dana. The building was dedicated and opened to the public on October 10, 1928, and cost about $35,000 to build. In 1987, the Angeles Mesa branch and several other branch libraries in Los Angeles were added to the National Register of Historic Places as part of a thematic group submission.

== Parks and recreation ==
- Angeles Mesa Park, 2929 West 48th St., Los Angeles, CA 90037

== Gallery ==
The past of Angeles Mesa
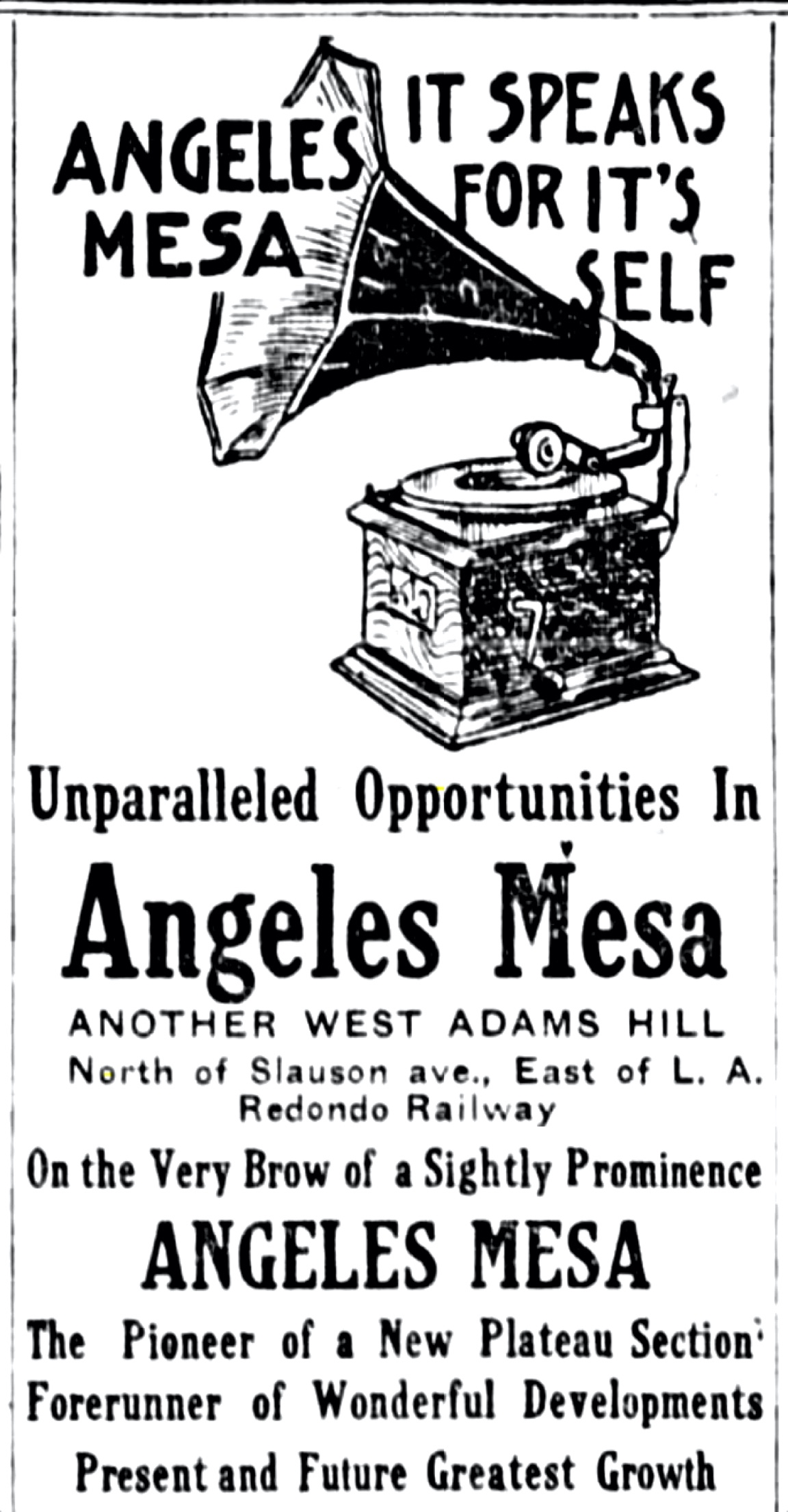
Advertisement for the new subdivision, Los Angeles Evening Express, May 21, 1910

Rubie Henrionnet, lighting carnival queen, January 1916

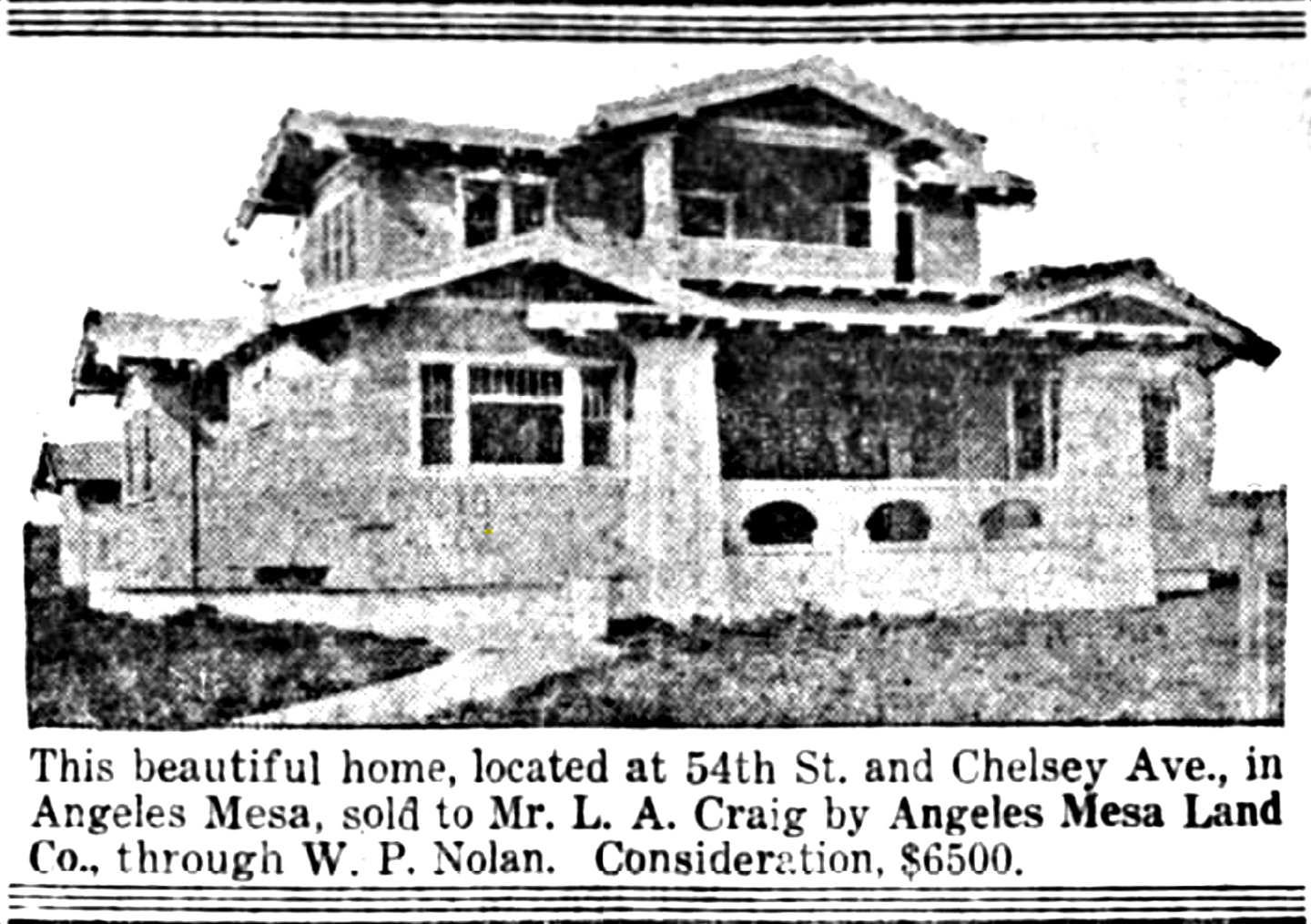
Advertisement for new house, Los Angeles Sunday Express, September 29, 1918

== See also ==
- Angeles Mesa skeletons
