= Amsterdam Stories USA =

- Directed by: Rob Rombout; Rogier van Eck
- Written by: Rob Rombout; Rogier van Eck
- Produced by: Hubert Toint; Jean-Jacques Neira
- Cinematography: Benjamin Wolf
- Edited by: Fanny Roussel; Alice de Matha; Frédéric Dupont
- Music by: Hughes Maréchal
- Production company: Saga Film
- Release date: November 2012
- Running time: 360 minutes
- Country: United States
- Language: English

Amsterdam Stories USA is a 2012 documentary film and road movie directed by Dutch filmmakers Rob Rombout and Rogier van Eck. It was produced by Hubert Toint and Jean-Jacques Neira of Belgium-based film production company, Saga Film. The premiere was aired in Amsterdam at the International Documentary Film Festival Amsterdam in November 2012 and at Bozar in January 2013.

The film traces the history, culture, and lives of 15 small American towns, all named Amsterdam. The places explored are New York City (New Amsterdam), Amsterdam New York, Amsterdam Pennsylvania, Amsterdam Ohio, Amsterdam Virginia, Amsterdam Georgia, Amsterdam Mississippi, Amsterdam Texas, Amsterdam Indiana, Amsterdam Wisconsin, Amsterdam Iowa, Amsterdam Missouri, Amsterdam Montana, Amsterdam Idaho, and Amsterdam California.

The film runs a total of six hours (360 minutes) which are divided into four ninety-minute chapters named East, South, Midwest, and West. It is the second film in a trilogy that is mainly concerned with places, towns, islands, and people named Amsterdam. It is preceded by Amsterdam via Amsterdam and succeeded by Amsterdam Black & White.

== Background ==
The idea of Amsterdam Stories USA was spawned when the filmmakers presented another film, Amsterdam via Amsterdam, in the United States. They noticed fifteen other Amsterdams in the country and when they lined them up on a map, they formed a linear route from coast to coast. They decided they would shoot a road movie capturing the same. They opted to start in New York and finish in California with Rombout scouting the New York area while van Eck visited California. Four shoots spanning six weeks each were made. East and West were filmed first followed by South and Midwest. The whole work spread over two years. Initially, the length of the whole film was not determined but the initial project with RTBF was meant to be two hours long at maximum. On completing the first assembly, there were six hours and Wilbur Leguèbe, the then head of documentary co-productions at RTBF, decided to program it in four ninety-minute chapters.

Rombout and van Eck, while playing themselves, travel by car around the United States, making fifteen stops at different towns, villages, and cities that have or have had the name Amsterdam. Whereas there is not much in common among these places, they are all similar in origin having been founded by Dutch explorers. The film draws an imaginary geography linking Amsterdam to Amsterdam landscapes with the way of life of the people who occupy them. Crossing from east to west and north to south, the film shows the native nature of each landscape and the signs of the people who lived in it and shaped them over time. As the filmmakers traversed through the cities, towns, and villages, they made intermittent stops to interview the inhabitants who recount their lives, memories, and experiences. About fifty stories are collected.

The cinematography, by Benjamin Wolf, used a Canon 5D digital camera and employed close-up shooting. Blur was introduced in their images where they would interview a speaker, make a close-up shot, and finish with a tracking shot from their moving car, drowning the subject into a blur. In terms of lighting and staging, interviewees were put in a semi-dark environment and near the camera for close-up filming. Light was illuminated only half of the subjects' face laterally, creating a chiaroscuro. The framing and lighting isolated the characters from their environment by creating a penumbra.

The filmmakers were partly mentored by Russell Banks who met them in Ohio. Banks opined that the documentary would change its audience's personality and view of America and challenged the directors to choose images that could reveal the lives, needs, and fears of the people they filmed. The fifty stories successfully met this challenge thanks to their characteristic balance between information and emotion. Various themes are addressed including the Vietnam War, the Civil rights movement, the assassination of John F. Kennedy. The theme of the American Dream also features in the filming with Rombout and van Eck asking witnesses about the same. The setting is thought to have caused discomfort and episodes of silence during interviews, leading to reflection and encouraging deep thinking about the history, way of life, and vision of America. From observations collected in the stories, it is evident that not all Americans get the opportunity to escape the social conditions of their lives such as racism.

Rob Rombout's work on the movie played a significant role in bolstering his career as a documentary filmmaker. The film showcased Rombout's storytelling abilities and his talent for uncovering compelling narratives in seemingly ordinary locations. The documentary's success allowed Rombout to establish a reputation for creating thought-provoking, visually engaging, and thematically rich films. This achievement contributed to his artistic growth as a filmmaker, paving the way for further exploration of diverse themes and storytelling techniques in his subsequent projects.

== Films ==
Film	Release date	Places involved	Director(s)	Producer(s)	Production company(s)
East	2012	New York City New York Pennsylvania Ohio	Rob Rombout Rogier van Eck	Hubert Toint Jean-Jacques Neira Wilbur	Saga Film Wallone Image Production RTBF
South	2012	Virginia Georgia Mississippi Texas	Rob Rombout Rogier van Eck	Hubert Toint Jean-Jacques Neira Wilbur	Saga Film Wallone Image Production RTBF
Midwest	2012	Indiana Wisconsin Iowa Missouri	Rob Rombout Rogier van Eck	Hubert Toint Jean-Jacques Neira Wilbur	Saga Film Wallone Image Production RTBF
West	2012	Montana Idaho California	Rob Rombout Rogier van Eck	Hubert Toint Jean-Jacques Neira Wilbur	Saga Film Wallone Image Production RTBF

=== Cast ===
- Edgar Oliver
- Rick Salazar
- Brom Cole
- Elinor Tatum
- Tony Jr
- Michael Botwinick
- William Staats
- Len Tantillo
- Bob Cudmore
- Susan Phemister
- Stephen Haven
- Linda Morell
- Lee McCoy
- Robert Pebbles Jr
- Cheryl Pebbles
- Russell Banks
- Cindy Kelly
- Cathy Kelly
- Marty Wright
- Walt Prysbilla
- Dennis Gallagher
- Jarrod Teeters
- David Teeters
- Dustin Teeters
- Adrian Cronauer
- Katherine Camper Harris
- Mary -Anne Roder Obensemart
- Leigh & Walter Lacy
- Nickie Zeakes Hawkins
- Jack Wingate
- Jacquelyn Wingate
- Jackson F. Wingate -Ruff
- Sheriff Wiley Griffin
- Myron Mixon
- Frank & Jesse James
- Kevin Hollis
- Helen Brooks
- Val McKnight
- Nancy Duren
- William D. Montgomery
- Charles Evers
- Jacqueline Salen
- Johan Salen
- Derek W. Shoobridge
- Bob Johnson
- Raymond E. Cotner Junior Andy
- Shaffer Mary
- Faye Shaffer Sven
- Amsterdam Pauline
- Williams Nancy
- Stoll Mike
- Caucutt Brian
- Beard Kit
- Mayer
- Kathryn Mayer
- Timothy Jacobson
- Napoléon Bonaparte
- Ray Bassett
- Sabrina Brie Hendersen
- Steven Thomas
- Phil Scriver & John Toenyes
- Pastor Jack
- Chesney Sherman
- Robert Amsterdam
- Alex Kunkle
- Don Peeters
- Gerrit Peeters
- The people of the Shoshone Paiute Reservation
- Veronica Alvarado
- Moon Asked
- Peter Cook

=== Additional crew and production details ===
Film	Crew/detail				
Film	Producer(s)	Executive Producer	Editor(s)	Cinematographer(s)	Production company
East	Hubert Toint, & Jean-Jacques Neira	Marie-Sophie Volkenner	Fanny Roussel, Alice de Matha, & Frédéric Dupont	Benjamin Wolf	Saga Film
South	Hubert Toint, & Jean-Jacques Neira	Marie-Sophie Volkenner	Fanny Roussel, Alice de Matha, & Frédéric Dupont	Benjamin Wolf	Saga Film
Midwest	Hubert Toint, & Jean-Jacques Neira	Marie-Sophie Volkenner	Fanny Roussel, Alice de Matha, & Frédéric Dupont	Benjamin Wolf	Saga Film
West	Hubert Toint, & Jean-Jacques Neira	Marie-Sophie Volkenner	Fanny Roussel, Alice de Matha, & Frédéric Dupont	Benjamin Wolf	Saga Film

== Reception ==
=== Critical and public response ===
Amsterdam Stories USA did not receive much media coverage. However, RTBF broadcast it in the years 2013, 2015, and 2017. The film has also received a number of screenings in festivals.

According to Michael Pattison, the non-interventionist approach used by the filmmakers where they would allow interviewees to speak without interruption left them to say anything wild without questioning. He also notes that, although the film is twice as long as it should have been, it hardly talks about the capitalistic nature of American life.

The film is also unavailable on US streaming services.

=== Awards, festivals, and nominations ===
==== Awards Won ====
Year	Award	Event	Place
2013	Winner Audience award for Best Feature film	Lisbon International Independent Film Festival	Portugal

==== Festivals and nominations ====
Year	Festival/nomination	Place
2012	International Documentary Film Festival Amsterdam	Amsterdam
2012	Private preview at the American Club Brussels	Brussels, Belgium
2013	Festival of the Amazing Travelers	Rennes, France
2013	International Festival of Ethnological Film	Belgrade, Serbia
2013	Francophone Cinema Fortnight	Paris, France
2013	Festival Aux Ecrans du Réel	Le Mans, France
2013	IndieLisboa Lisbon International Independent Film Festival	Lisbon, Portugal
2013	International Festival of Books and Films "Étonnants Voyageurs”	Saint-Malo, France
2013	Nominated for documentary of the month	Paris, France
2014	Taiwan International Documentary Festival	Taiwan
2014	4th Magritte Awards	Mont des Arts, Brussels
2015	Guest at the national studio for contemporary arts, Fresnoy	France
2016	Tiburon International Film Festival	US
2017	11th Annual KAFFNY	New York City, US
2017	Special presentation at the John Adams Institute (Netherlands)	Amsterdam
2018	The Short Long World Festival	Corrientes, Argentina
