= Afton, Nevada =

- Ghost Town
- Location within the state of Nevada
- Coordinates: 41°28′40″N 115°06′53″W
- Country: United States
- State: Nevada
- County: Elko
- Elevation: 6,430 ft (1,960 m)
- Time zone: UTC-8 (Pacific (PST))
  - Summer (DST): UTC-7 (PDT)

Afton is a ghost town Elko County, Nevada, in the United States.

== History ==
Afton was settled by Mormons from Afton, Wyoming and the new site was named with name, but also known by "Taber City". The town has started in 1910 and had fifty homesteaders. Afton was located north of the large Mormon dry farming experiment at Metropolis. The post office at Afton was in operation from September 1914 until January 1918. The site was plagued in 1915 by a lack of rain and for an invasion of rabbits. Crops were poor and in 1917 only half of the original settlers remained. Conditions improved somewhat, but not enough to use the land again. Nowadays, the area is still used for farming and raising livestock. The existing ranches are owned by descendants of the original settlers.
