= Arrowhead Highlands, California =

Unincorporated community in California, United States

Arrowhead Highlands
- Unincorporated community
- Location in California Arrowhead Highlands (the United States)
- Coordinates: 34°13′48″N 117°15′46″W
- Country: United States
- State: California
- County: San Bernardino
- Elevation: 4,970 ft (1,515 m)
- Time zone: UTC−8 (Pacific Time Zone)
  - Summer (DST): UTC−7 (PDT)
- Area codes: 442/760
- GNIS feature ID: 1660269

Arrowhead Highlands is an unincorporated community in San Bernardino County, in the U.S. state of California. It is located 4,970 feet (1,515 meters) above sea level.
