= Afton Township, Brookings County, South Dakota =

Afton Township, South Dakota
- Township
- Location within South Dakota Location within the United States
- Coordinates: 44°24′33″N 96°43′2″W
- Country: United States
- State: South Dakota
- County: Brookings

Area
  - Total: 35.7 sq mi (92.4 km^{2})
  - Land: 35.7 sq mi (92.4 km^{2})
  - Water: 0 sq mi (0.0 km^{2})
- Elevation: 1,716 ft (523 m)

Population (2020)
  - Total: 212
  - Density: 5.94/sq mi (2.29/km^{2})
- Time zone: UTC-6 (Central (CST))
  - Summer (DST): UTC-5 (CDT)
- Area code: 605
- FIPS code: 46-00380
- GNIS feature ID: 1267977

Afton Township is a township in Brookings County, South Dakota, United States. The population was 224 in the 2000 census.
