= Afton, Isle of Wight =

Coordinates: 50.675°N 1.508°W

Afton
- Village
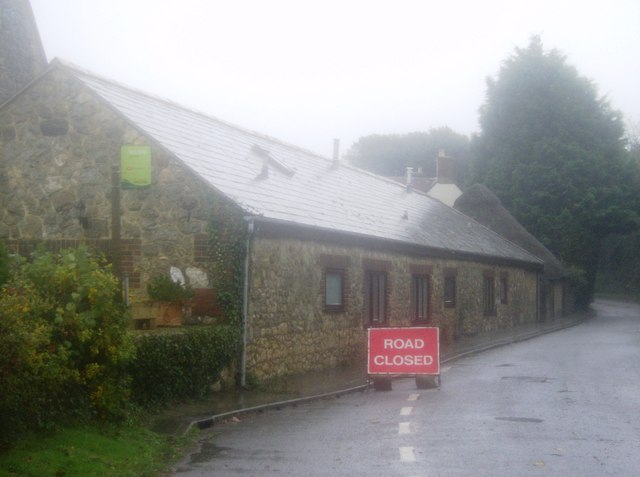
- Afton Farm

- Location within the Isle of Wight
- OS grid reference: SZ3500086351
- Civil parish: Freshwater
- Unitary authority: Isle of Wight
- Ceremonial county: Isle of Wight
- Region: South East
- Country: England
- Sovereign state: United Kingdom
- Post town: Freshwater
- Postcode district: PO
- Police: Hampshire and Isle of Wight
- Fire: Hampshire and Isle of Wight
- Ambulance: Isle of Wight

Afton is a hamlet just outside Freshwater on the west side of the Isle of Wight. It features a local hill known as Afton Down which was the site of the Isle of Wight Festival in 1970, one of the largest rock concerts to be held in the UK. Freshwater Bay Golf Course is located on Afton Down. Afton lends its name to a number of local properties, including Afton Lodge, Afton Manor and Afton Thatch, the latter two dating from the 17th Century.

Exterior scenes of the Cult film Guest House Paradiso, starring Adrian Edmondson and Rik Mayall, were filmed on the A3055 (Military Road), leading into the hamlet.

A barrow located on Afton Down has been the subject of archaeological interest, and is thought to be from the Bronze Age.

A yearly Apple Day Festival takes place every fall at a commercial nursery known as Afton Park. The Apple Festival draws several thousand people a year to enjoy entertainment, a children's "apple olympics", and demonstrations.

Bus transport is provided by Southern Vectis route 7, which runs close by.

== Name ==
The name means 'the farmstead or estate belonging to a man called Æffa', from Old English Æffa (personal name) and tūn.

1086: Affetune

1189-1204: Affetone

1224: Afton

1271: Afetone

1279: Affton
