= Afton, Glenn County, California =

Unincorporated community in California, United States

Afton
- Unincorporated community
- Location in California Afton (the United States)
- Coordinates: 39°25′12″N 121°57′59″W
- Country: United States
- State: California
- County: Glenn
- Elevation: 72 ft (22 m)

Afton is an unincorporated community in Glenn County, California, United States. It is located 3.25 miles (5 km) south-southeast of Butte City, at an elevation of 72 feet (22 m). A general store was operated for many years at Afton but closed down in recent years. Afton is primarily an agricultural community. The area is known for flooding during winters with high rainfall.

Afton was settled in the 1850s, having easy access to travel and shipping along the Sacramento River. Persistent flooding, however, forced residents to adjust by building makeshift levees.

A post office operated at Afton from 1887 to 1910 and from 1915 to 1923.

Along with Butte City, Afton is one of only two communities in Glenn County lying east of the Sacramento River.
