= Alder Springs, Fresno County, California =

Unincorporated community in California, United States

Alder Springs
- Unincorporated community
- Location in California Alder Springs (the United States)
- Coordinates: 37°03′58″N 119°24′07″W
- Country: United States
- State: California
- County: Fresno
- Elevation: 4,426 ft (1,349 m)

Alder Springs is an unincorporated community in Fresno County, California, United States. It is located 5.5 miles (9 km) west-southwest of Shaver Lake Heights, at an elevation of 4426 feet (1349 m).

Beginning in the early 1920s, Alder Springs was a popular resort, where winter sports and snow were accessible by car from Fresno. The Alder Springs area is highly prone to wildfire: The Alder Springs resort was nearly destroyed by a major fire in August 1931 and numerous homes in the area were wiped out by the Creek Fire in September 2020.
