= Afton, San Bernardino County, California =

Afton
- Former community
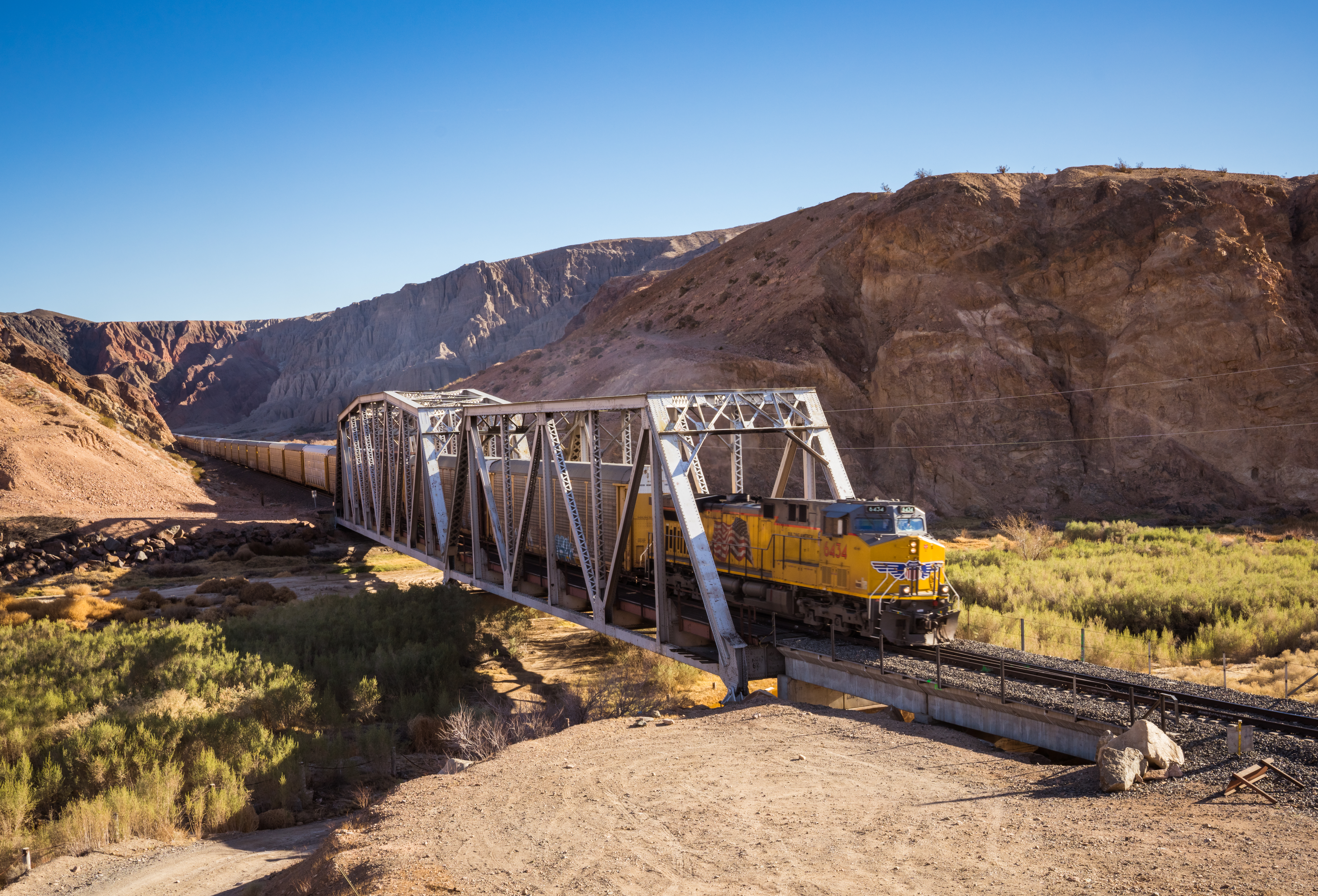
- Railroad in Afton Canyon

- Location in California Afton (the United States)
- Coordinates: 35°02′11″N 116°22′47″W
- Country: United States
- State: California
- County: San Bernardino
- Elevation: 1,407 ft (429 m)
- Time zone: UTC−8 (Pacific Time Zone)
  - Summer (DST): UTC−7 (PDT)
- Area codes: 442/760
- FIPS code: 06-00360
- GNIS feature ID: 252842

Afton is a former community in San Bernardino County, California, United States. Afton lies along a railroad near the Mojave River, 23.5 miles (37.8 km) southwest of Baker. It was a station on the San Pedro, Los Angeles and Salt Lake Railroad, established in 1904, home to a number of railroad employees.
