= Afton Township, Ward County, North Dakota =

Afton Township, North Dakota
- Township
- Location within the state of North Dakota
- Coordinates: 48°10′3″N 101°20′18″W
- Country: United States
- State: North Dakota
- County: Ward

Government
  - Clerk/Treasurer: Cathy Johnson
  - Chairman: Kevin Ward

Area
  - Total: 35.29 sq mi (91.41 km^{2})
  - Land: 35.13 sq mi (90.99 km^{2})
  - Water: 0.16 sq mi (0.42 km^{2})
- Elevation: 1,850 ft (564 m)

Population (2020)
  - Total: 799
  - Density: 22.7/sq mi (8.78/km^{2})
- Time zone: UTC-6 (Central (CST))
  - Summer (DST): UTC-5 (CDT)
- ZIP code: 58701 (Minot)
- Area code: 701
- FIPS code: 38-00740
- GNIS feature ID: 1036992

Afton Township is a township in Ward County, North Dakota, United States. The population was 799 at the 2020 census.

== Geography ==
As of 2026, Afton Township has a total area of 35.295 square miles (91.41 km^{2}), of which 35.133 square miles (90.99 km^{2}) is land and 0.162 square miles (0.42 km^{2}) is water.

=== Major highways ===
- U.S. Highway 83

== Demographics ==
As of the 2024 American Community Survey, there were an estimated 275 households with a margin of error of 80.
