= Afton Township, Sanborn County, South Dakota =

Afton Township, South Dakota
- Township
- Location within South Dakota Location within the United States
- Coordinates: 44°9′36″N 97°55′13″W
- Country: United States
- State: South Dakota
- County: Sanborn

Area
  - Total: 34.5 sq mi (89.3 km^{2})
  - Land: 34.5 sq mi (89.3 km^{2})
  - Water: 0 sq mi (0.0 km^{2})
- Elevation: 1,332 ft (406 m)

Population (2000)
  - Total: 52
  - Density: 1.6/sq mi (0.6/km^{2})
- Time zone: UTC-6 (Central (CST))
  - Summer (DST): UTC-5 (CDT)
- Area code: 605
- FIPS code: 46-00420
- GNIS feature ID: 1267672

Afton Township is a township in Sanborn County, South Dakota, United States.
