= Actis, California =

Unincorporated community in California, United States

Actis
- Unincorporated community
- Location in California Actis (the United States)
- Coordinates: 34°57′31″N 118°08′55″W
- Country: United States
- State: California
- County: Kern
- Elevation: 2,562 ft (781 m)

Actis (formerly Highberg, Rummington, and Gloster) is an unincorporated community in Kern County, California, United States. It is located 6.5 miles (10 km) north of Rosamond, at an elevation of 2,562 feet (781 m). It is situated between Mojave and Rosamond at Backus Road and California State Route 14.

The Highberg post office opened in 1917, changed its name to Rummington in 1918, and closed permanently in 1927.

== Climate ==
Climate data for Actis
Month	Jan	Feb	Mar	Apr	May	Jun	Jul	Aug	Sep	Oct	Nov	Dec	Year
Mean daily maximum °F (°C)	57.1 (13.9)	60.2 (15.7)	64.6 (18.1)	73.8 (23.2)	81.4 (27.4)	90.5 (32.5)	98.5 (36.9)	97.2 (36.2)	92.3 (33.5)	79.6 (26.4)	67.5 (19.7)	59.9 (15.5)	76.9 (24.9)
Mean daily minimum °F (°C)	29.9 (−1.2)	33.8 (1.0)	37.8 (3.2)	45.7 (7.6)	52.3 (11.3)	61.3 (16.3)	67.8 (19.9)	65.7 (18.7)	58.4 (14.7)	47.4 (8.6)	35.9 (2.2)	31.5 (−0.3)	47.3 (8.5)
Average precipitation inches (mm)	1.1 (28)	1.3 (33)	1.2 (30)	0.4 (10)	0.1 (2.5)	0 (0)	0 (0)	0.1 (2.5)	0.2 (5.1)	0.2 (5.1)	0.4 (10)	1.2 (30)	6.2 (160)
Source: Weatherbase
