= Indiana Virtual School =

Location
- Carmel, Indiana, United States
- 39.9282°N 86.149°W

Information
- Established: 2011; 15 years ago
- Founder: Thomas Stoughton
- NCES School ID: 180010602515
- Principal: Lora Feeser
- Faculty: 11.75
- Grades: 6-12
- Enrollment: 3,376 (2017)
- Student to teacher ratio: 112.34
- Campus type: virtual
- Website: www.indianavirtual.com

Indiana Virtual School is a virtual school sponsored by the state of Indiana and authorized by Daleville Community Schools. The school is based in Indianapolis, Indiana, United States. The school serves grades 6–12 and enrolled a total of 1,909 students for the 2015–16 school year according to the Indiana Virtual School Annual Report. Online schools are an alternative to traditional public schools.

Indiana Virtual School is a public charter school accredited by the Indiana Department of Education and authorized by Ball State University.

The school has been criticized for an extraordinarily high student teacher ratio, more than 200 students per teacher. The U.S. average for all virtual schools is 35.5, and for all public schools 16. Only 64 of 985 seniors graduated in 2017, statistics similar to the previous year, the lowest graduation rate of any public school in the state.
