= Ohio Virtual Academy =

- OHVA logo

Location
- 1690 Woodlands Suite 200; Maumee, Ohio 43537; United States

Information
- Type: Virtual school
- Teaching staff: 515
- Grades: Kindergarten – 12th grade
- Enrollment: 12,644 (2019)
- Student to teacher ratio: 1 teacher to 24.5 students
- Colors: Red & white
- Affiliation: Stride Inc.
- Website: www.k12.com/ohva

The Ohio Virtual Academy (OHVA) is one of many virtual charter schools that is powered by the curriculum provider Stride Inc. The academy, like most Stride-supplied schools, provides the student with textbooks, materials, and a loaned computer, so the student can access their online lessons.

== Curriculum ==
The course lessons and lessons are on the K12 Online School (OLS). There, parents are allowed to customize their student's school calendar and add/remove course lessons from the daily plan and add/remove vacation days. However the student must have completed each core course (Math, English, Science, and Social Studies) to 90% or higher by the first Friday of June and have had at least 920 hours logged. Course lessons include online reading followed by offline textbook work and then the lesson test, also called an assessment. The test consists of an online multiple choice quiz and/or a textbook quiz that has multiple choice and/or short answer. The offline textbook multiple choice and/or short answer questions are answered by the student, the answers are then graded with the teacher guide answer key book by the parent who enters the results into the online test. The online questions are then graded by the computer and the test grade is then displayed. At the end of the school day the parent records attendance on the OLS of what courses their student worked on that day and how much time they spent.

== Notable alumni ==
- Leelah Alcorn, transgender girl who committed suicide in 2014
- Anthony De La Torre, actor and singer
- Isabela Merced, actress and singer

== Criticism ==
Criticisms have been levelled against this schooling approach due to poor test scores.

== See also ==
- K12 Inc.
- Wisconsin Virtual Academy
