= Scott Fox =

Scott or Scotty Fox may refer to:

- Scott Fox, town founder of Scuffletown, Henderson County, Kentucky
- Sir David Scott Fox (1910–1985), British diplomat and writer
- Scott Fox (American football) (1963–2015), American football linebacker
- Scott Fox (author), American financial and self-help author
- Scotty Fox (director), American pornographic film director
- Scott Fox (footballer) (born 1987), Scottish football goalkeeper
- Scotty Fox Jr., American football quarterback
