= Clinton, Tennessee =

City in Tennessee, United States

Clinton
- City
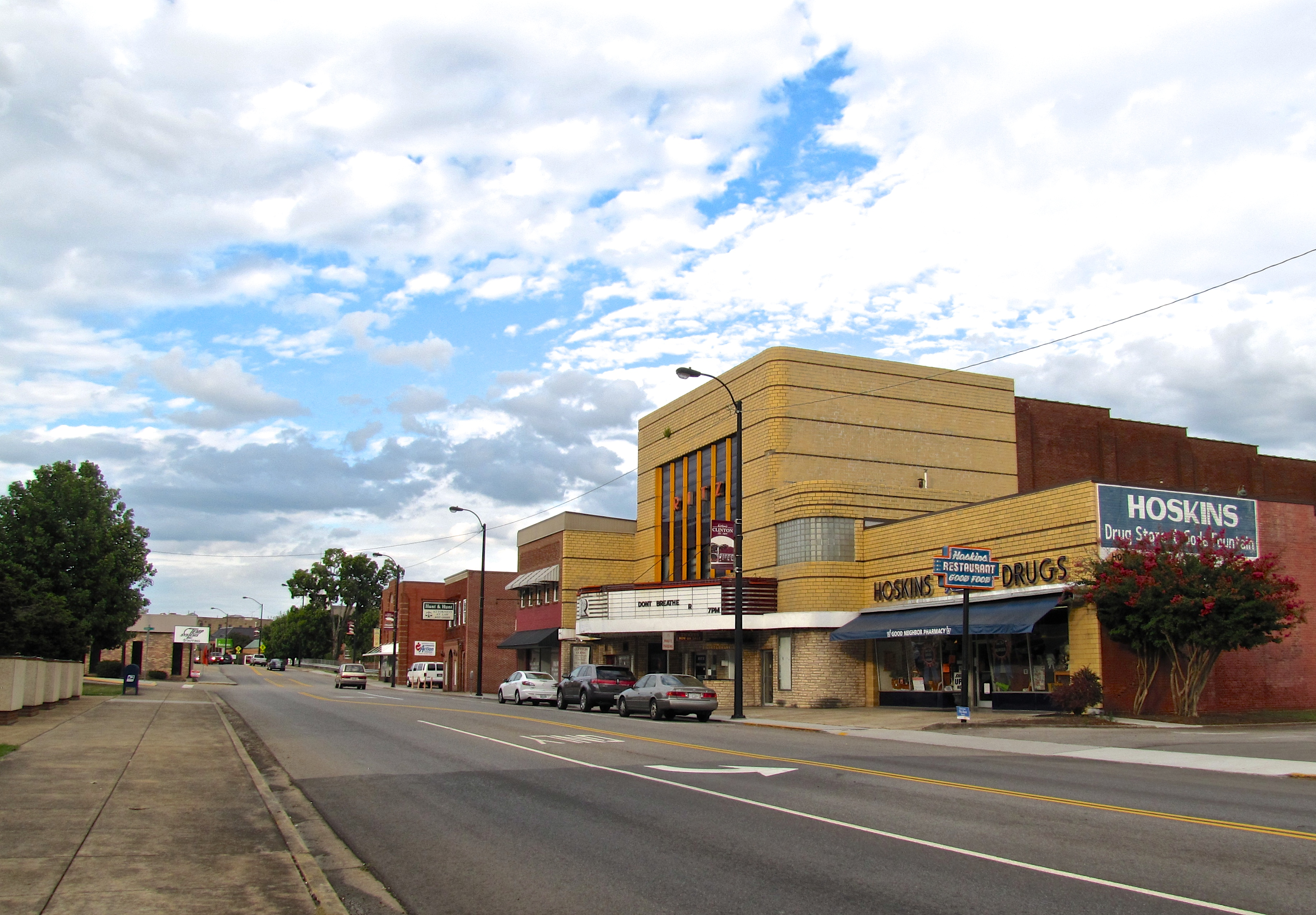
- Main Street in Downtown Clinton

- Seal Logo

- Location of Clinton in Anderson County, Tennessee.
- Coordinates: 36°6′17″N 84°7′43″W
- Country: United States
- State: Tennessee
- County: Anderson
- Incorporated: 1801

Government
  - Type: Council–manager
  - Mayor: Scott Burton
  - Vice Mayor: Larry Gann
  - City Manager: Roger Houck
  - City Council: Members: Wendy Maness; Rob Harrell; Brian Hatmaker; Matt Foster; David Queener

Area
  - Total: 12.25 sq mi (31.72 km^{2})
  - Land: 11.63 sq mi (30.11 km^{2})
  - Water: 0.62 sq mi (1.60 km^{2})
- Elevation: 824 ft (251 m)

Population (2020)
  - Total: 10,056
  - Density: 864.9/sq mi (333.93/km^{2})
- Time zone: UTC-5 (Eastern EST)
  - Summer (DST): UTC-4 (EDT)
- ZIP codes: 37716-37717
- Area code: 865
- FIPS code: 47-15580
- GNIS feature ID: 1305981
- Website: www.clintontn.net

Clinton is a city in and the county seat of Anderson County, Tennessee. Clinton is included in the Knoxville metropolitan area. Its population was 10,056 at the 2020 census.

== History ==
=== Early history ===
Prehistoric Native American habitation was common throughout the Clinch River valley, especially during the Woodland period (1000 B.C. – 1000 A.D.) and the Mississippian period (1000–1550 A.D.). A number of such habitation sites were excavated in the 1930s and 1950s in anticipation of the construction of Norris Dam and Melton Hill Dam, respectively. The Melton Hill excavations uncovered two substantial Woodland period villages along the Clinch at Bull Bluff and Freels Bend, both approximately 20 miles (32 km) downstream from Clinton.

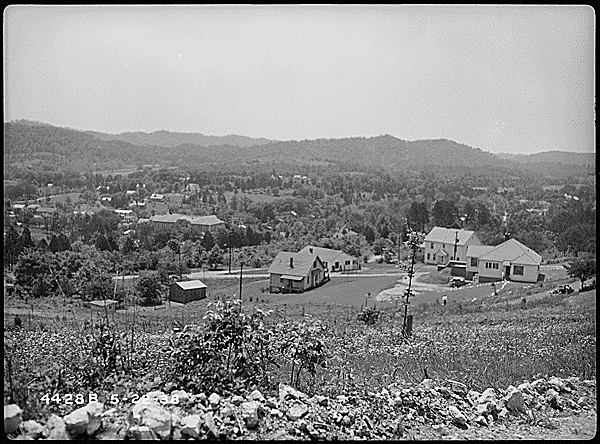
View of Clinton in 1938

By the time Euro-American explorers and longhunters arrived in the Clinch valley in the mid-18th century, what is now Anderson County was part of a vast stretch of land claimed by the Cherokee. Although the Treaty of Holston, signed in 1791, was intended as a negotiation with the Cherokee to prohibit Euro-American settlement of the area including what is today Anderson County, the treaty became ineffective as more settlers moved through the Appalachian Mountains from Virginia and North Carolina into Tennessee. The earliest settlers in Anderson County included the Wallace, Gibbs, Freels, Frost and Tunnell families. The flooding of white settlers into the Indian domain was cause for several skirmishes, which eased after the Treaty of Tellico in 1798 (including an origination point for the land to be relinquished from the Cherokee being the Tellico Blockhouse) allowed for greater ease in settling the area.

Founded in 1801, the town of Burrville was named in honor of Aaron Burr, first-term Vice President under Thomas Jefferson. Land was selected and partitioned for a courthouse, and Burrville was designated as the county seat for the newly formed Anderson County. The county was partitioned from portions of Grainger County and Knox County in 1801; neighboring Roane County was also formed from a portion of Knox County in 1801.

On November 8, 1809, by an act of the Tennessee State Legislature, the town of Burrville was renamed because of the disgrace of the Burr–Hamilton duel, which resulted in the death of Alexander Hamilton. The selection of the name "Clinton" was to honor George Clinton, who was the U.S. Vice President at the time. George Clinton was one of Burr's New York political rivals who, along with Alexander Hamilton, destroyed Burr's bid for the governorship of New York after his single-term vice presidency. George Clinton succeeded Burr as the second-term vice president for Jefferson in 1805 (and also served as James Madison's vice president, making Clinton the first vice president to serve under two presidents and the first vice president to die in office). Because of the political position of George Clinton as vice president at the time of Burrville's name change, compared to DeWitt Clinton's position as the mayor of New York City, most likely the residents of the town of Burrville would have been more readily identifiable and more honorable toward George Clinton than DeWitt; therefore, it is most likely Clinton was named after George Clinton, barring historical proof.

=== Growth and industry ===
With the construction of Clinton's Southern Railway depot in the 1890s and the nearby booming coal industry, the population rose from about 325 in 1874 to 1,198 in 1890. During this time, the Southern Hotel accommodated overnight visitors arriving via passenger train until it burned down in 1908 in a fire that also affected most of Depot Street (now Market Street). Another Southern Railway depot was constructed in 1914 while coal mining continued to be a large enterprise for Anderson County.

Clinton's first large manufacturing company, Magnet Knitting Mills, a textile mill for men's socks, opened in 1906 with less than 60 workers. By 1910, the workforce grew to over 200 employees. In 1916, the mill employed over 500 workers, constructed an addition to its building, and started planning for the production of women's silk hosiery.

Prior to the flooding cause by the Tennessee Valley Authority's construction of the Melton Hill Dam, the Clinch River adjacent to Clinton was known for its freshwater pearl industry, however when river depths rose in the mid-20th century due to the dam, the warmer water temperature disrupted the mussels' habitat so that pearls were no longer harvestable.

=== World War II ===
The Clinton Engineer Works, named after Clinton, was the official name for the Manhattan Project site in Tennessee which produced the enriched uranium used in the 1945 bombing of Hiroshima, as well as the first examples of reactor-produced plutonium. The site was also known by the name of its largest township, Oak Ridge. The works were located starting about 3 miles (4.8 km) southwest of Clinton, continued for 10 miles (16 km) towards Kingston and contained roughly 58,900 acres (23,800 ha).

=== Clinton High School desegregation controversy ===
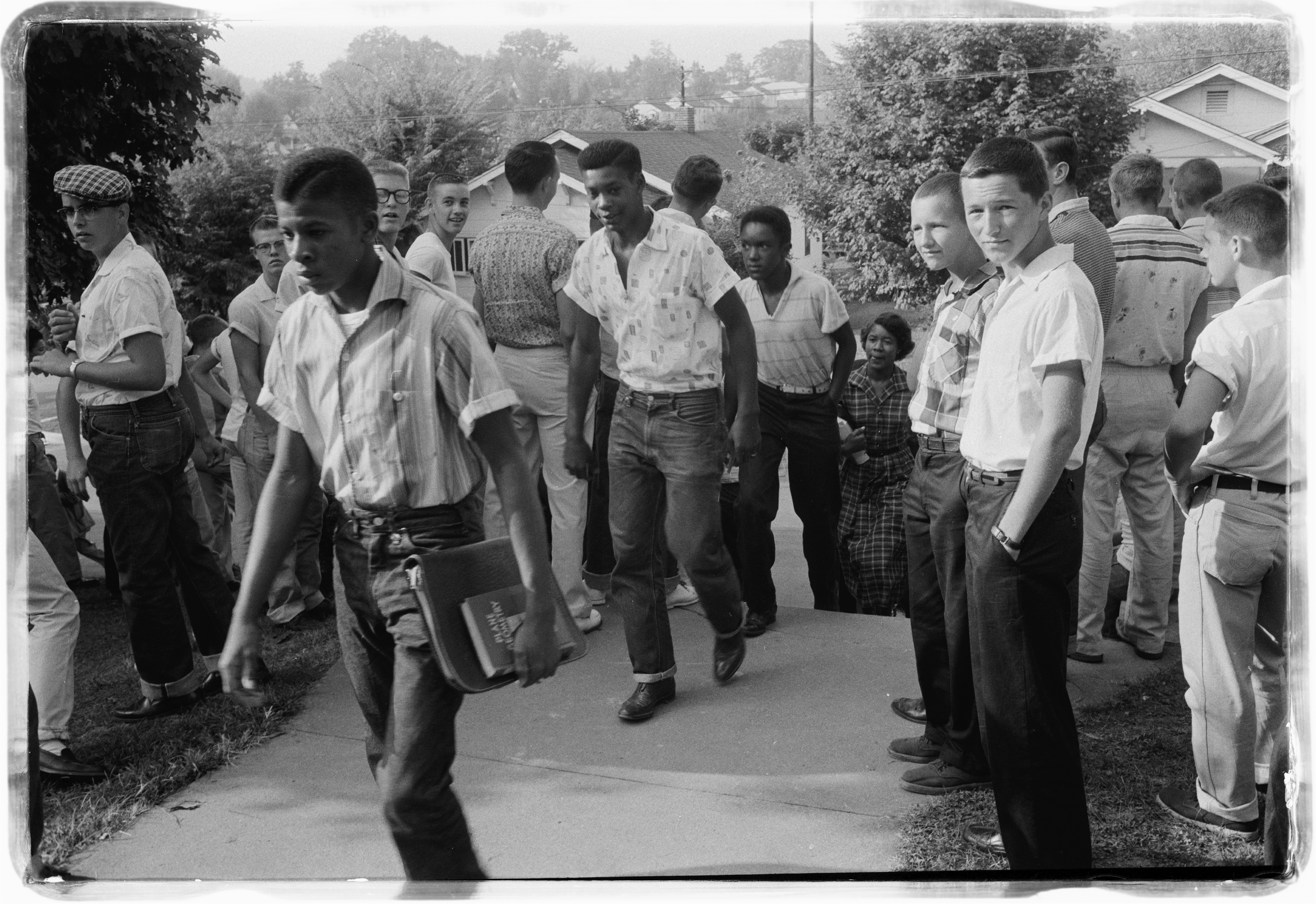
African-American students entering Clinton High School, December 1956

In 1956, Clinton gained national attention when segregationists opposed the desegregation of Clinton High School. Following the U.S. Supreme Court decision in the case of Brown v. Board of Education, a court order required the desegregation of the high school. Twelve African-American students enrolled in the high school in the fall of 1956. On August 27, 1956, The Clinton 12 attended classes at Clinton High School for the first time, becoming the first African-Americans to desegregate a state-supported public school in the Southeast.

While the first day of classes occurred without incident, pro-segregation forces led by John Kasper and Asa Carter arrived in Clinton the following week and rallied the city's white citizens. Riots broke out in early September, forcing Governor Frank G. Clement to station National Guard units in Clinton throughout September. Sporadic violence and threats continued for the next two years, culminating in the bombing of Clinton High School on October 5, 1958. With an influx of outside aid, however, the school was quickly rebuilt. A museum dedicated to the desegregation crisis, the Green McAdoo Cultural Center, is housed in Clinton's segregation-era Green McAdoo School. The Green McAdoo School served elementary school-aged black children, so until the desegregation movement, black high school-aged children were expected to travel to Knoxville for education.

=== Rogers Group quarry pushback ===
In the 1990s, the Rogers Group, a firm specializing in road paving, began a campaign to reactivate an abandoned quarry and build an asphalt plant just east of Clinton near the community of Bethel. The initiative met with opposition from local and environmental groups, who were concerned that the plant would release cancer-causing toxins into nearby residential neighborhoods. Others were concerned about plummeting property values, noise pollution, damage from rock blasting, and environmental damage to Buffalo Creek. The company argued that it would follow stringent environmental and pollution guidelines, retention ponds would limit runoff, and that the site would be surrounded by vegetation. Nevertheless, Anderson County refused to rezone the quarry property for industrial uses, and Rogers Group sued the county in 1995.

In December 2006, after Rogers Group's lawsuit had stagnated, the city of Clinton voted to annex the quarry property. On August 20, 2007, the Clinton City Council voted 6–1 to rezone the quarry property for industrial uses, paving the way for the plant's construction. In response, a local advocacy group known as Citizens for Safety and Clean Air filed a lawsuit on behalf of several Bethel residents in Anderson County Chancery Court contending that the council's rezoning was unconstitutional and seeking an injunction preventing the council from rezoning the property as an industrial zone.

=== Modern day ===
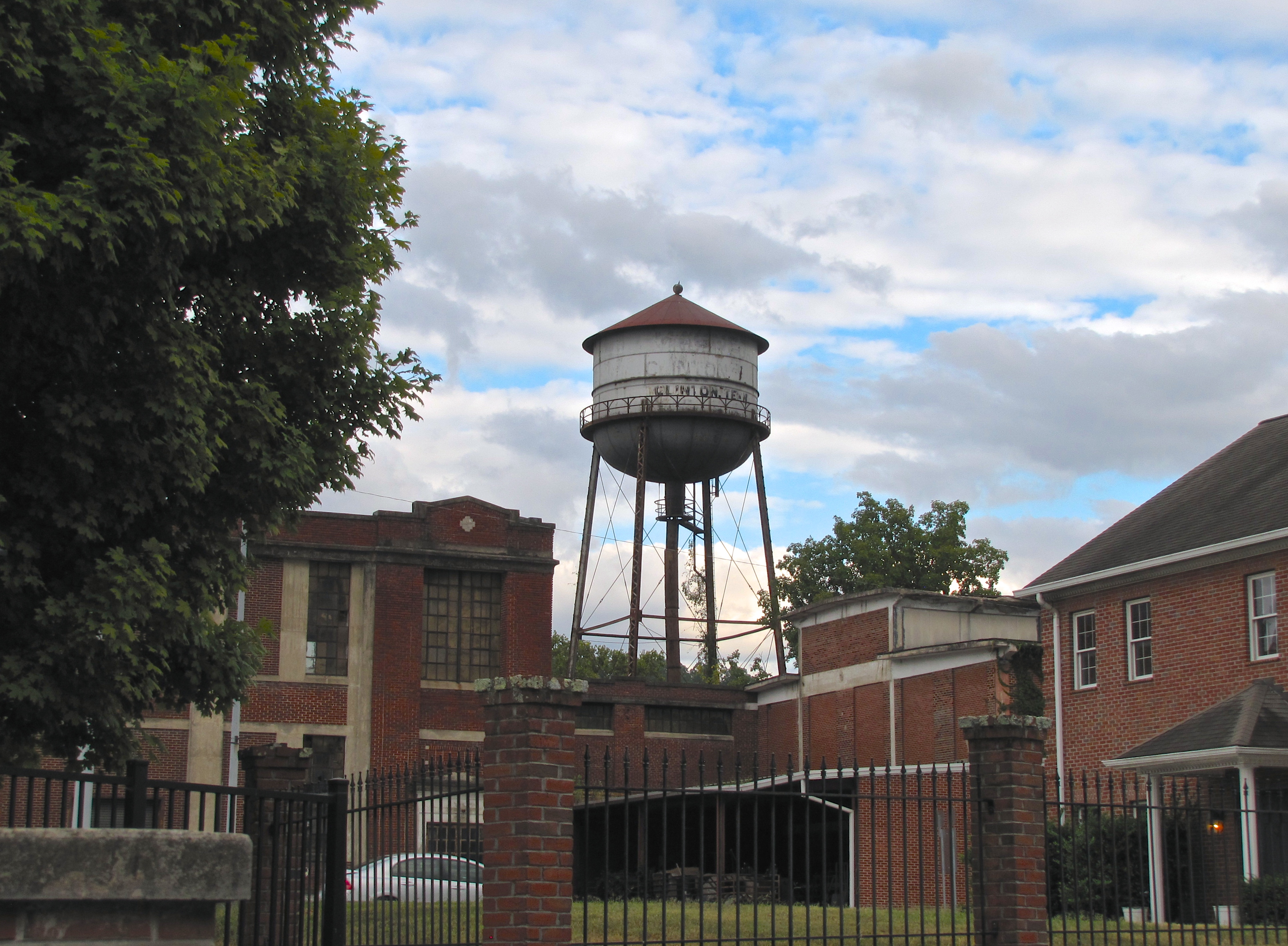
Magnet Mills factory site and water tower in 2016

In 2018, urban developers and city officials met with the proposal to redevelop the downtown and waterfront area of Clinton after the Tennessee Department of Transportation began construction on a new bridge to carry US 25W-SR 9 across the Clinch River. The highlight of the project is the 7-acre site of the former Magnet Mills complex, having 1,400 feet of Clinch River frontage. Proposed additions to the site include improved commercial development and pedestrian access in the downtown area, and a waterfront esplanade and multi-story mixed-use buildings with upper-level residential space and ground level retail and restaurant space.

Since 2018, an unknown developer based out of Knoxville has planned, under contract, the purchase of the Magnet Mills site along with a nearby plot of land with the intention of converting the area into a mix of residential and retail use. The City of Clinton has also applied for grants towards the improvement of the streets and sidewalks in the city's downtown area, including the historical Depot Street (now Market Street). In July 2019, the remaining structures of Magnet Mills site, excluding the water tower, were demolished as the developer closed the sale on mill site.

In early 2019, Aspire, a 370-acre multi-amenity park, was planned for development south of Clinton's downtown area. The park was proposed by the local non-profit organization, the Hollingsworth Foundation, which owns land for the site along with the Tennessee Valley Authority. Construction work began in October 2019 and the park opened in October 2024. Aspire boasts a restaurant, The Pearl; an event venue, The Exchange; a boat and canoe/kayak put-in, The Launch; dog park; playground; mountain bike circuit; lawn, wildflower meadow, and shade gardens; 22 miles of hiking and biking trails; and a military monument.

== Geography ==
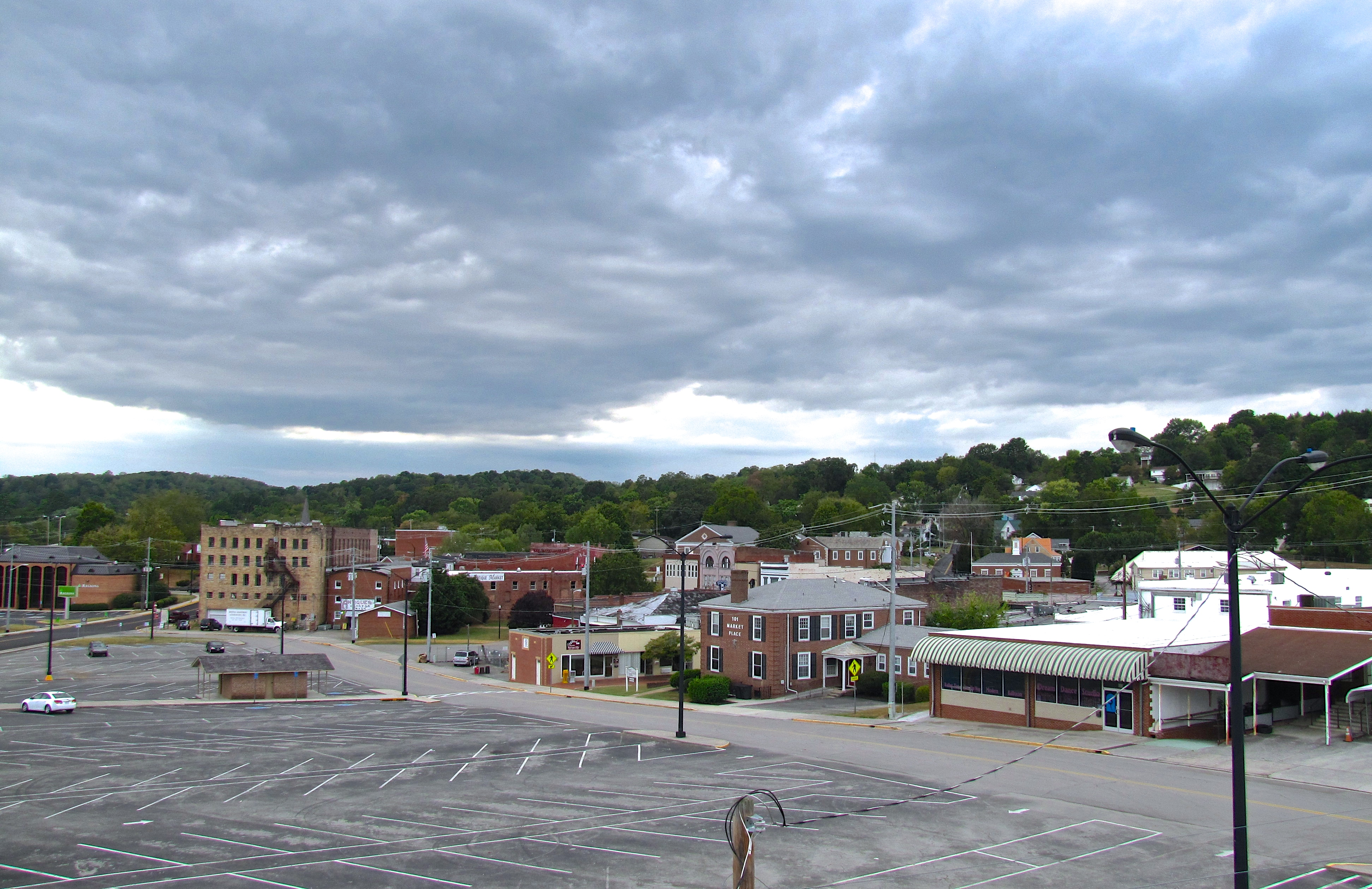
Downtown Clinton

Clinton is located at 36°6′17″N 84°7′43″W (36.104772, −84.128487), along the Clinch River, immediately downstream from a point where the southwestward-flowing river bends sharply to the northeast before wrapping around Lost Ridge and continuing again toward the southwest. This section of the river is technically part of Melton Hill Lake, a reservoir created by the impoundment of the Clinch at Melton Hill Dam some 35 miles (56 km) downstream from Clinton. Clinton is located approximately 59 miles (95 km) upstream from the mouth of the Clinch at the Tennessee River.

Clinton is surrounded by a series of long, narrow ridges that represent the western fringe of the Appalachian Ridge and Valley Province. Northwest of Clinton is Walden Ridge, the eastern escarpment of the Cumberland Plateau.

Clinton is concentrated around the junction of Tennessee State Route 61 and U.S. Route 25W. State Route 61 connects the city to Norris and Andersonville to the northeast and the community of Marlow and the town of Oliver Springs to the southwest, following a natural series of pathways through the mountain terrain. U.S. Route 25W connects the city to Knoxville to the southeast and Rocky Top and Caryville to the north. Interstate 75 intersects TN-61 northeast of downtown Clinton.

According to the United States Census Bureau, Clinton has a total area of 12.0 square miles (31.1 km^{2}), of which 11.4 square miles (29.6 km^{2}) is land and 0.58 square miles (1.5 km^{2}), or 4.91%, is water.

=== Climate ===
The climate in this area is characterized by relatively high temperatures and evenly distributed precipitation throughout the year. According to the Köppen Climate Classification system, Clinton has a Humid subtropical climate, abbreviated "Cfa" on climate maps.

Climate data for Clinton, Tennessee
Month	Jan	Feb	Mar	Apr	May	Jun	Jul	Aug	Sep	Oct	Nov	Dec	Year
Mean daily maximum °C (°F)	45 (7)	50 (10)	60 (16)	70 (21)	77 (25)	84 (29)	87 (31)	86 (30)	80 (27)	70 (21)	58 (14)	48 (9)	68 (20)
Mean daily minimum °C (°F)	25 (−4)	28 (−2)	36 (2)	43 (6)	52 (11)	60 (16)	65 (18)	64 (18)	58 (14)	45 (7)	36 (2)	29 (−2)	45 (7)
Average precipitation mm (inches)	5.1 (130)	5.3 (130)	5.7 (140)	4.3 (110)	3.8 (97)	4.6 (120)	5.2 (130)	4.1 (100)	3.2 (81)	2.6 (66)	3.6 (91)	5 (130)	52.7 (1,340)
Source: Weatherbase

== Demographics ==
Historical population
Census	Pop.	Note	%±
1870	325		—
1880	263		−19.1%
1890	1,198		355.5%
1900	1,111		−7.3%
1910	1,090		−1.9%
1920	1,409		29.3%
1930	1,927		36.8%
1940	2,761		43.3%
1950	3,712		34.4%
1960	4,943		33.2%
1970	4,794		−3.0%
1980	5,245		9.4%
1990	8,972		71.1%
2000	9,409		4.9%
2010	9,841		4.6%
2020	10,056		2.2%
2025 (est.)	10,466	▲	4.1%

=== 2020 census ===
As of the 2020 census, there was a population of 10,056, with 4,429 households and 2,857 families residing in the city.

The median age was 43.9 years; 21.0% of residents were under the age of 18 and 22.1% were 65 years of age or older. For every 100 females there were 90.0 males, and for every 100 females age 18 and over there were 87.4 males age 18 and over.

96.7% of residents lived in urban areas, while 3.3% lived in rural areas.

There were 4,429 households in Clinton, of which 26.9% had children under the age of 18 living in them. Of all households, 41.0% were married-couple households, 19.1% were households with a male householder and no spouse or partner present, and 33.6% were households with a female householder and no spouse or partner present. About 33.3% of all households were made up of individuals and 14.4% had someone living alone who was 65 years of age or older.

There were 4,756 housing units, of which 6.9% were vacant. The homeowner vacancy rate was 1.8% and the rental vacancy rate was 5.3%.

Racial composition as of the 2020 census
Race	Number	Percent
White	9,043	89.9%
Black or African American	245	2.4%
American Indian and Alaska Native	34	0.3%
Asian	84	0.8%
Native Hawaiian and Other Pacific Islander	3	0.0%
Some other race	101	1.0%
Two or more races	546	5.4%
Hispanic or Latino (of any race)	250	2.5%

=== 2000 census ===
As of the census of 2000, there was a population of 9,409, with 4,201 households and 2,688 families residing in the city. The population density was 862.8 inhabitants per square mile (333.1/km^{2}). There were 4,441 housing units at an average density of 407.2 per square mile (157.2/km^{2}). The racial makeup of the city was 95.47% White, 2.72% African American, 0.33% Native American, 0.38% Asian, 0.28% from other races, and 0.82% from two or more races. Hispanic or Latino of any race were 0.85% of the population.

There were 4,201 households, out of which 27.4% had children under the age of 18 living with them, 47.9% were married couples living together, 13.2% had a female householder with no husband present, and 36.0% were non-families. 31.8% of all households were made up of individuals, and 12.7% had someone living alone who was 65 years of age or older. The average household size was 2.21 and the average family size was 2.78.

In the city, the population was spread out, with 21.6% under the age of 18, 8.9% from 18 to 24, 28.2% from 25 to 44, 23.7% from 45 to 64, and 17.6% who were 65 years of age or older. The median age was 39 years. For every 100 females, there were 86.4 males. For every 100 females age 18 and over, there were 81.7 males.

The median income for a household in the city was $32,481, and the median income for a family was $43,099. Males had a median income of $32,120 versus $23,550 for females. The per capita income for the city was $17,730. About 11.8% of families and 16.5% of the population were below the poverty line, including 21.1% of those under age 18 and 11.1% of those age 65 or over.

== Government ==
Clinton uses the council-manager government system, which was established in 1890 when the city was incorporated. Clinton is governed by a seven-member city council composed of the mayor and six council members.

Clinton is represented in the Tennessee House of Representatives in the 33rd district by Rick Scarbrough, a Republican. In the Tennessee State Senate, the city is represented by the 5th district by Lieutenant Governor of Tennessee Randy McNally, also a Republican. Clinton is represented in the United States House of Representatives by Chuck Fleischmann of the 3rd congressional district, a Republican.

== Notable people ==
- Trey Hollingsworth, congressman born in Clinton
- John C. Houk, congressman born in Clinton
- The McKameys, Southern Gospel group based in Clinton
- Charles McRae, NFL 1st round draft choice, All-American football tackle
- John R. Neal, congressman born near Clinton
- Paul Turner, American Baptist pastor notable for his efforts in the integration of Clinton High School
- Larry Seivers, two-time All-American wide receiver at the University of Tennessee
- Barry A. Vann, author, speaker, and professor of historical geography
