= Green McAdoo School =

- U.S. National Register of Historic Places
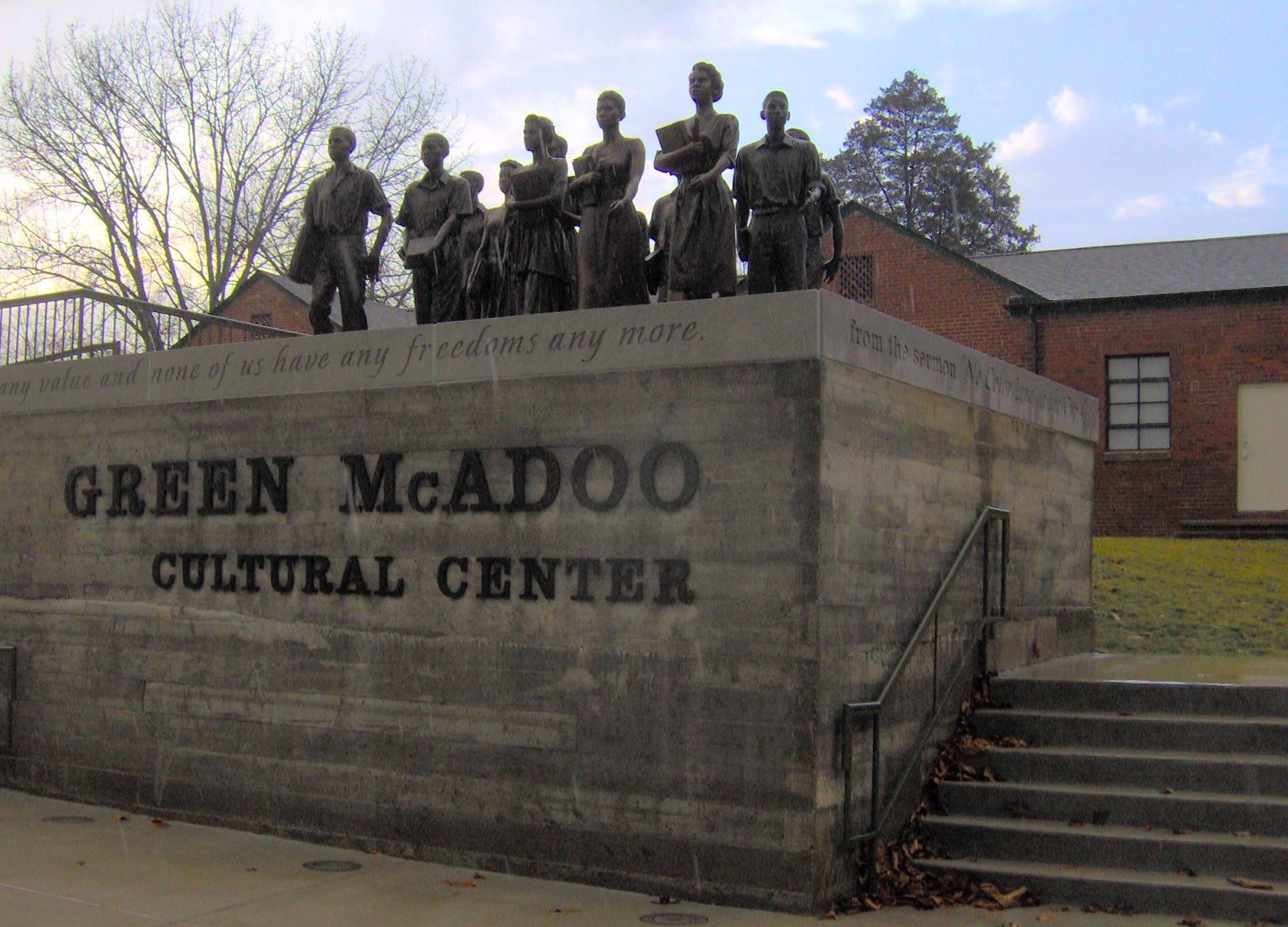
- View of the front of the Green McAdoo Cultural Center, including the statues of the "Clinton 12" next to the steps that lead to the entrance.

- Location within Tennessee
- Location: 101 School St. Clinton, Tennessee
- Coordinates: 36.1025°N 84.1403°W
- NRHP reference No.: 05001218
- Added to NRHP: November 8, 2005

The Green McAdoo School in Clinton, Tennessee, was the community's segregated elementary school for African American children until 1965. The school was completed in 1935, and designed by architect Frank O. Barber of Knoxville. It is now a museum and is listed on the National Register of Historic Places.

The Green McAdoo School deteriorated after its closure, but was reopened as a museum and cultural center in 2006. Federal grants and local government funding helped to pay for renovations to the building. A set of life-size bronze statues of the "Clinton 12," the 12 African American students who attended Clinton High School in the fall of 1956 when the high school was desegregated under court order, is displayed outside the school's front entrance.

In 2018, the Green McAdoo Cultural Center became a part of the Tennessee State Museum system.

== See also ==
- Clinton High School, Tennessee
