= Paul Turner (pastor) =

American Baptist pastor (1923-1980)

- Born: February 10, 1923; Jonesboro, Arkansas, United States
- Died: December 18, 1980 (aged 57)
- Occupation: Pastor
- Spouse: Jane Turner

Paul Winston Turner (February 10, 1923 – December 18, 1980) was an American Baptist pastor notable for his efforts in the integration of Clinton High School in Clinton, Tennessee.

== Integration crisis ==
Following the U.S. Supreme Court's 1954 ruling in Brown v. Board of Education, Clinton High School was ordered in the fall of 1956 to be the first Tennessee high school to desegregate. While twelve black students started attending the school, after continued physical violence directed at them by both rioters outside the school and white classmates within it, they decided to boycott school in an effort to force the federal courts to intervene.

Rev. Turner, pastor of the white First Baptist Church of Clinton, and a respected leader in the community, felt he needed "to lead our church to do the right thing." Spurred by his reading of the Bible and the writings of Olin T. Binkley of Southeastern Baptist Theological Seminary, he began preaching against prejudice. After he and Leo Burnett, a supervisor at the local hosiery mill, persuaded the students and their parents to end their boycott, Turner and Burnett escorted them back to school on December 4, 1956, amid a hostile crowd.

Upon his return, he was severely beaten by members of the local White Citizens' Council. Despite significant injuries, the next Sunday he preached that "there is no color line at the cross of Jesus."

The high school was destroyed by dynamite four years later; no one was arrested for that crime. The school ultimately reopened on the grounds of a former all-black elementary school.

== Subsequent life ==
Turner hoped to attend divinity school but was long unable to obtain the money. In 1958, he moved to another church in Nashville, where he continued to be active in the civil rights movement. He later became a professor at Golden Gate Baptist Theological Seminary.

After being dismissed from his professorate in 1980, Turner committed suicide. His family claimed that "his spirit was broken" due to his experiences in Clinton.

== Sources ==
- The Brave and Tragic Trail of Reverend Turner, Rachel L. Martin, 2015
- The Role of the Churches in Clinton's Desegregation, Green McAdoo Cultural Center, Clinton, TN
- First Baptist Church of Clinton website
