= Hattie Cotton Elementary School bombing =

1957 bombing by segregationists in Nashville, Tennessee

Coordinates: 36.1916°N 86.7477°W

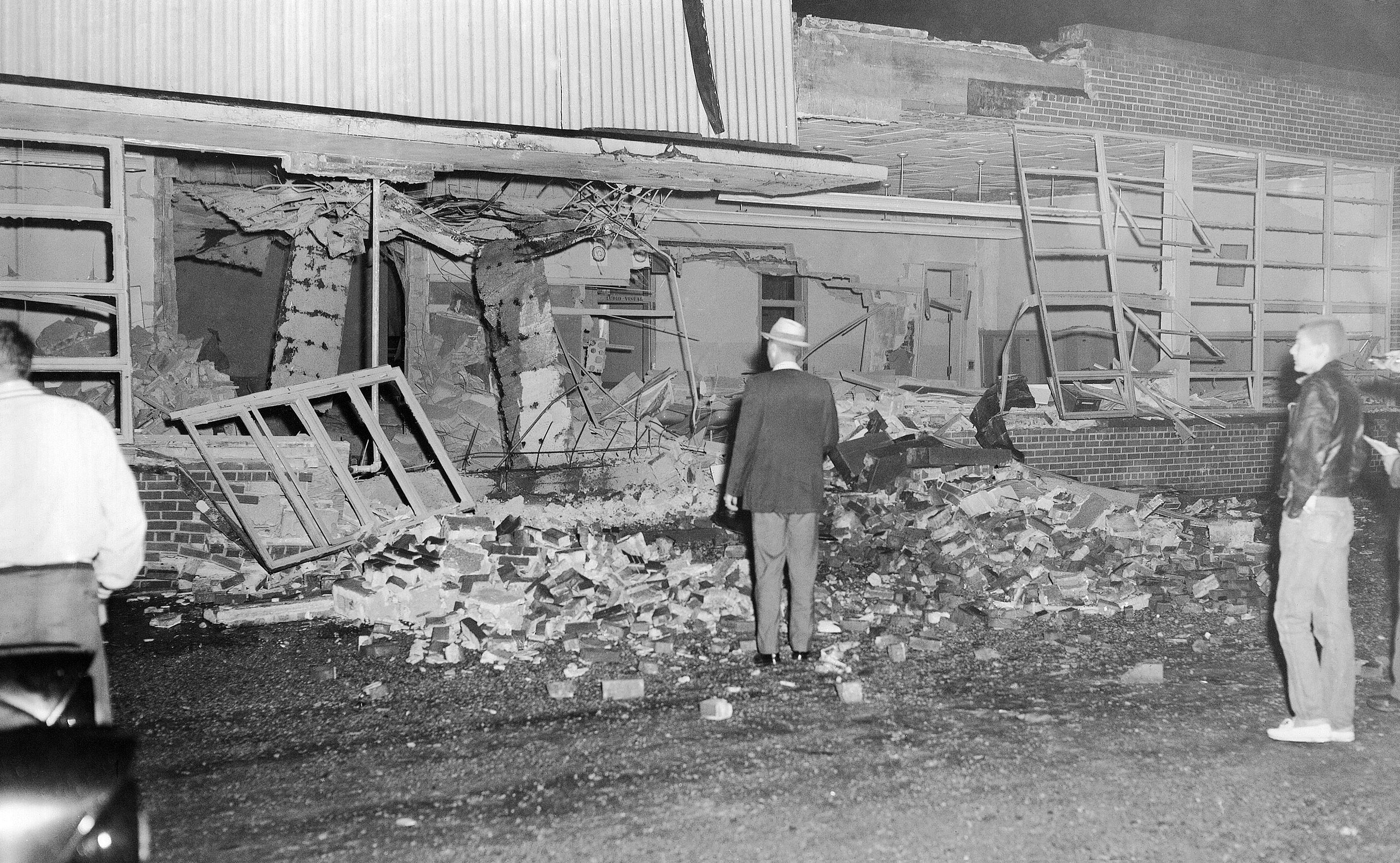
Onlookers looking at the damage to the school

The Hattie Cotton Elementary School bombing on September 10, 1957, was a destructive bombing by pro-segregationists of an elementary school in Nashville, Tennessee, shortly after it admitted its first African American student in the midst of the Civil Rights Movement. The school is now known as Hattie Cotton STEM Magnet Elementary School, and focuses on science, technology, engineering and math for students in grades kindergarten through five.

== Background ==
Hattie Cotton Elementary School opened September 1, 1950, at 1033 W. Greenwood Ave. in East Nashville. Built by George E. Reese and designed by the Marr & Holman architectural firm, the school was located west of Gallatin Pike to help students avoid the highway.

The school is named after Hattie R. Cotton, a Nashville educator who taught the chairman of the city board of education. She became a teacher in 1905 and was named the city's academic supervisor in 1919. She died two years after her retirement in 1926.

Hattie Cotton became an integrated school in 1957, following the 1954 Supreme Court decision, Brown v. Board of Education, which set in motion the integration of American schools. After a court order in January 1957, Nashville adopted what became known as The Nashville Plan in the fall. The plan was to begin with integration at six city elementary schools — Bailey, Buena Vista, Fehr, Glenn, Hattie Cotton, and Jones — which were to integrate one grade level per year. That process began Sept. 9, 1957, when 19 black six-year-olds attempted to attend their first day of school. Four were denied for administrative reasons.

Hattie Cotton admitted one black student, a 6-year-old black girl. Following the first day of school, dynamite exploded just after midnight, early on Sept. 10, 1957, rocking the neighborhood. The school reopened nine days later and repairs followed in 1958.

In the early 1990s, the original building was torn down and construction of a new building began, reopening on April 9, 1996. The school became a STEM-based magnet school in 2011.

== 1957 bombing ==
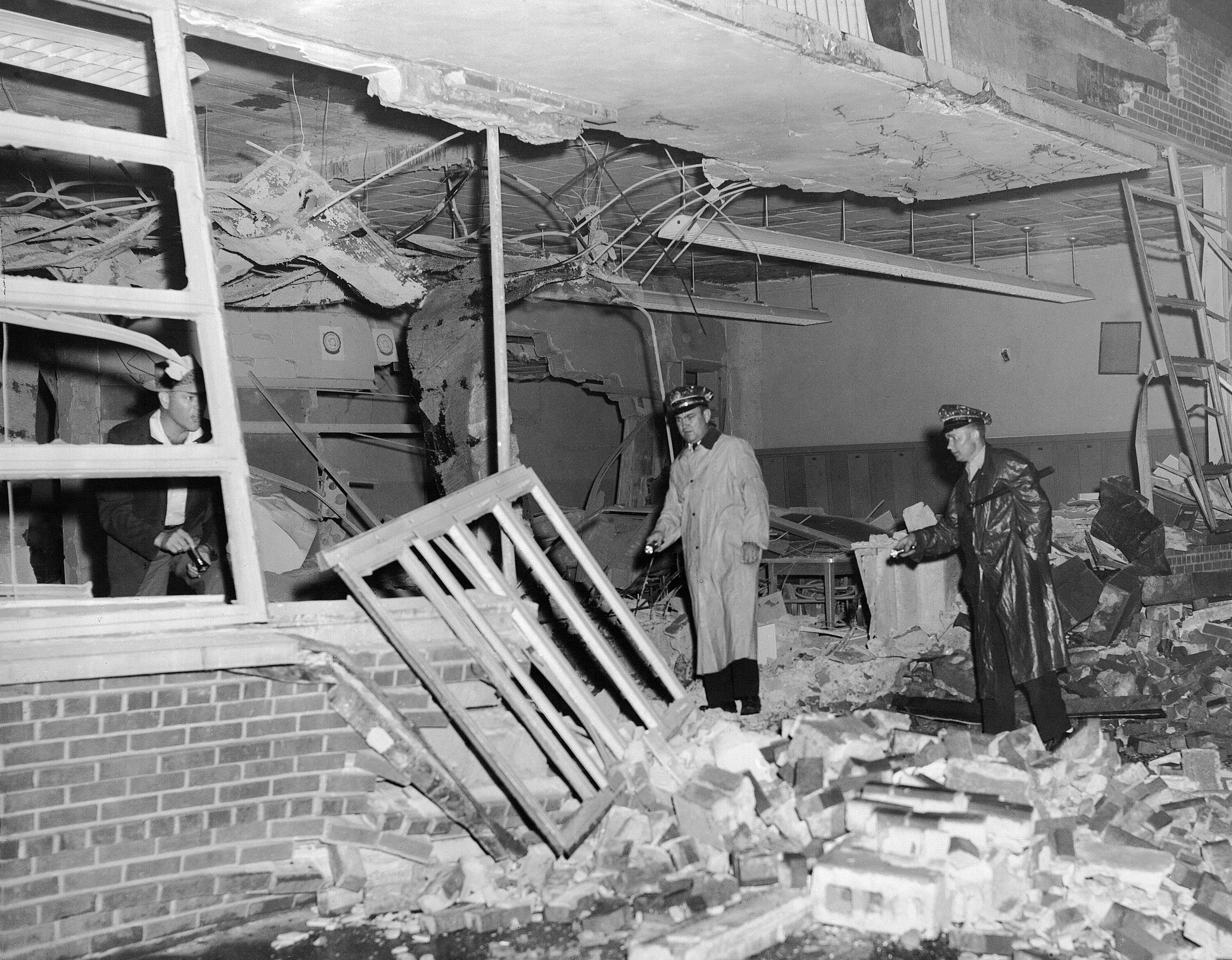
Police examining the wreckage

The dynamiting of Hattie Cotton Elementary School on September 10, 1957, "tore down walls, knocked out every window in the modern one-story structure," and caused at least $71,000 (equivalent to $604,415 in 2024) in damage to the library, classrooms, interior walls and lockers.

The attack triggered a response from local civic leaders and members of the Nashville Student Movement. Nashville Police Chief Douglass E. Hosse said that the incident, "has gone beyond a matter of integration. These people [segregationists] have ignored the laws and they have shown no regard for you [whites] or any citizen."

Rev. Kelly Miller Smith and Rev. Will Campbell held a community meeting that showed, "the bombing had touched off all the stored-up rage in the black community. Speaker after speaker got up and denounced the bombing and demanded some kind of reprisal. There was talk of guns and retaliation. For most of the evening, Smith let the meeting go on without challenging the speakers. It was as if he knew that he had to let the rage vent itself." Smith eventually spoke: "We can go forward as planned and try to show them the right way."

Hattie Cotton reopened nine days later without the 6-year-old girl, whose mother transferred her to the all-black Head Elementary School in North Nashville.

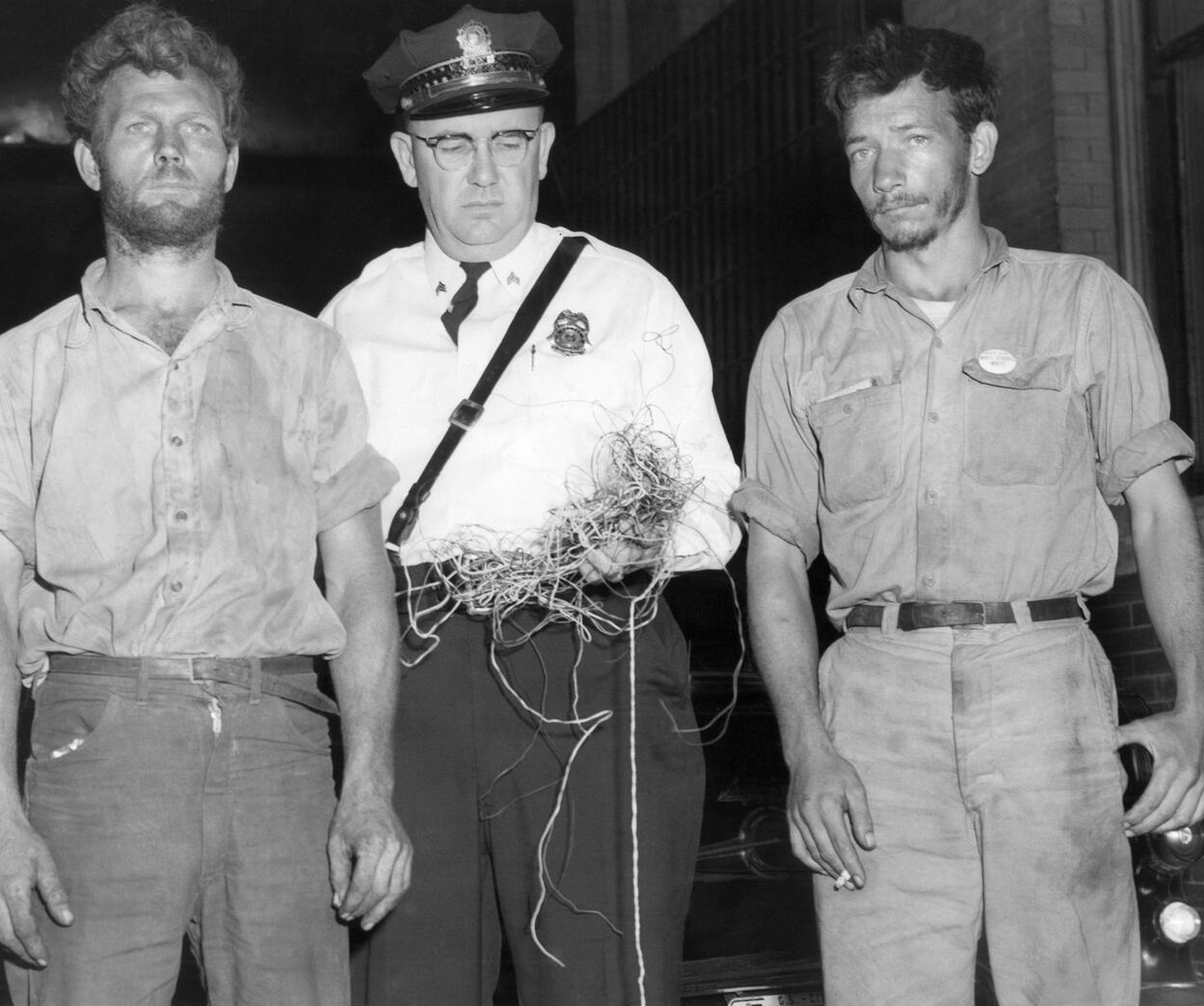
Police holding suspects

Despite several weeks of investigation, a $7,000 (equivalent to $59,590 in 2024) cash reward for information, and the detaining of at least six suspects, no one was ever charged in the school bombing.

Nationally known segregationist John Kasper was questioned but never charged. He was described by police as playing a role in securing a cache of dynamite two days before the bombing at Hattie Cotton.

Kasper was later convicted, in November 1958, for inciting a riot on the first day of school in Nashville. At a rally, Kasper predicted "blood will run in the streets of Nashville before Negro children go to school with white."

== Legacy ==
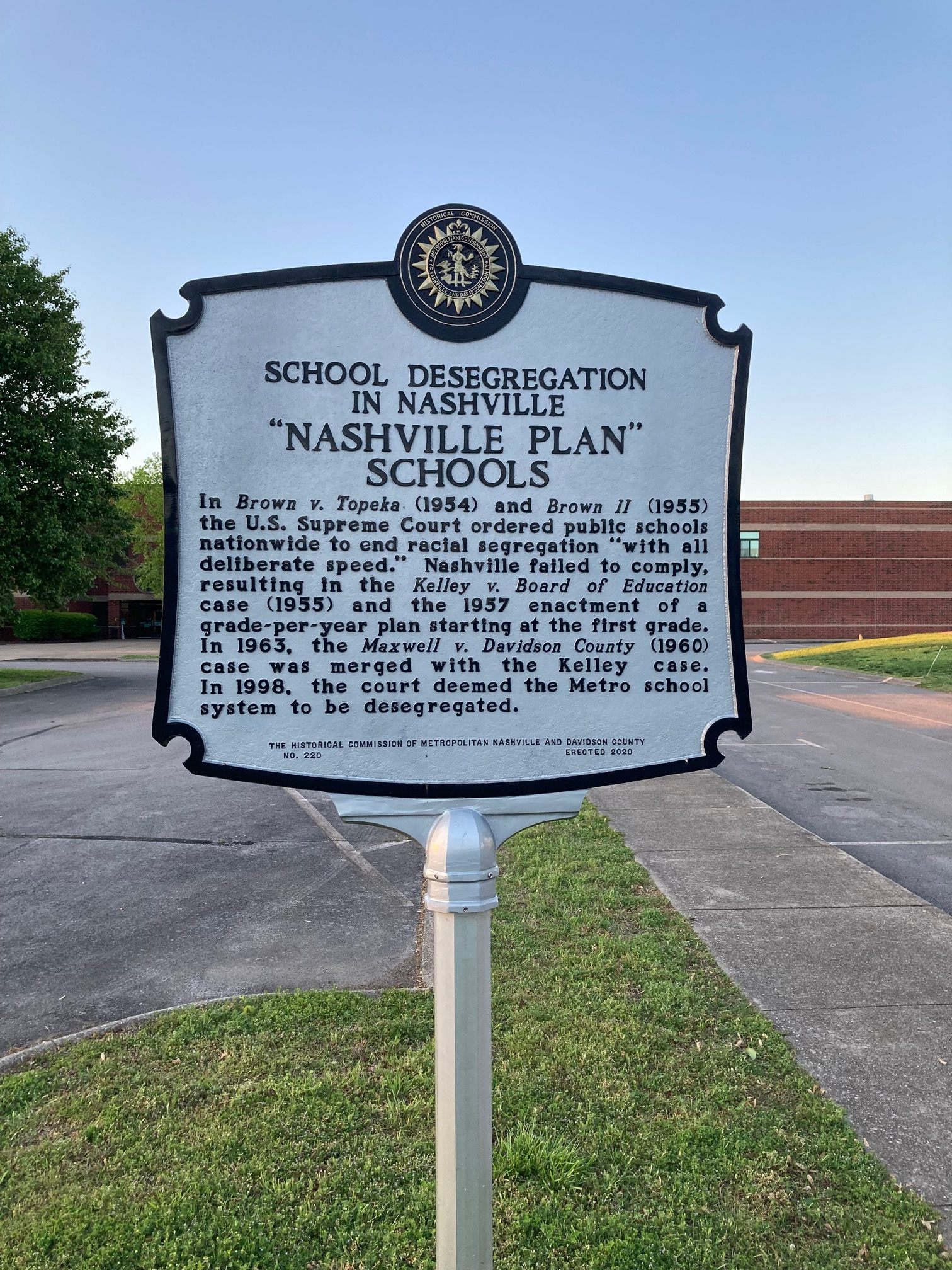
A historic marker about desegregation at the school. The bombing is addressed on the reverse side.

Out of the first six Nashville schools to integrate — Bailey, Buena Vista, Fehr, Glenn, Hattie Cotton, and Jones — most remain open as of 2017.

Hattie Cotton STEM Magnet Elementary School emphasizes science, technology, engineering and math education. The school partners with Vanderbilt University for science instruction and project-based learning.
