= The Clinton 12 =

American school integration pioneers

The Clinton 12 marching outside.

The Clinton 12 were a group of twelve African-American students who integrated the previously all-White Clinton High School in Clinton, Tennessee in 1956. These students were some of the first to participate in desegregation of southern K–12 public schools following the 1954 Supreme Court ruling of Brown v. Board of Education. The Clinton 12 were subject to discrimination and violence for attending the all-White high school, which caused some of them to leave the school and move to other states. The integration of Clinton High School caused turmoil in both its Black and White communities. Out of the original twelve, only two students of the group, Bobby Cain and Gail Ann Epps, ended up graduating from the school.

== The students ==
The twelve original students were:

- Jo Ann Allen (born September 15, 1941 in Clinton — died December 3, 2025 in Los Angeles, California)
- Bobby Cain (died September 22, 2025 aged 85)
- Anna Theresser Caswell (born November 25, 1942 in Fayetteville, Tennessee — died March 12, 2025)
- Gail Ann Epps (born September 14, 1940 in Clinton)
- Minnie Ann Dickey (born October 31, 1939 in Knox County, Tennessee)
- Ronald Gordon Hayden (born March 4, 1942 in Clinton — died February 10, 1966)
- William Latham (born in Powell, Tennessee — died December 18, 2019 in Oak Ridge, Tennessee aged 79)
- Alvah Jay McSwain (born June 12, 1941 in Clinton — died June 2, 2019)
- Maurice Soles (born July 25, 1941 in Clinton — died December 21, 2011 in Oak Ridge, Tennessee)
- Robert Thacker (born August 12, 1939 — died November 6, 2019 in Michigan)
- Regina Turner (born in Atlanta, Georgia)
- Alfred Williams (born December 6, 1935 in Anniston, Alabama — died March 14, 2019 in Clinton aged 83)

== Background ==
In 1954 the Supreme Court of the United States ruled that Tennessee schools had to desegregate in the case of Brown v. Board of Education. Prior to that decision, schools for White students received much more money than their Black counterparts. Black students in Anderson County were bused to Knoxville (a 35-minute drive, one way) to attend their segregated schools. Black families and the Black community sought equal education for their children, and the matter was taken to the courts. In 1950, a few years prior to the Supreme Court ruling, some African-American students tried to enroll in Clinton High School but were denied. This issue was taken to court and became known as McSwain et al. v. County Board of Education of Anderson County, Tennessee. The judge ruled that the students could not enroll. After Brown v. Board of Education, Anderson County Public Schools tried to delay desegregation of schools as long as they could, but were ordered in January 1956 to start the process in the upcoming school year. In the fall of 1956, the Clinton 12 enrolled at Clinton High School.

== Integration ==
External videos
- Q&A interview with Rachel Louise Martin on A Most Tolerant Little Town: The Explosive Beginning of School Desegregation, July 30, 2023, C-SPAN external media
- "The Boyce Family and The Clinton 12", Disney Channel

The first day of classes for the Clinton 12 was mostly peaceful. But the second day was filled with violence, protests, and riots. A group of White supremacists and people who favored segregation showed up to Clinton to stop the desegregation. The leader of this group was John Kasper who was an executive of the White Citizens Council and a member of the Ku Klux Klan. This group of adults, along with White students, screamed obscenities and threats at the Clinton 12 as they entered the school. Even after a judge ordered him to stop, Kasper led large protests outside the school until he was arrested for contempt of court. Unfortunately, even with Kasper in jail, violence and unrest were still at an all-time high. A new segregationist leader, Asa Carter, came in to continue the riots.

During the first two days of the school year in September, White supremacists and pro-segregationists damaged or destroyed property including windows and vehicles. They also sent bomb threats to several local places and people in the community, including the county courthouse, the local newspaper, and even the mayor's house. The Tennessee National Guard was sent down to Clinton to restore peace.

Discrimination and threats continued after the National Guard arrived. Crosses were burned in the yards of community members who supported integration, and the Black communities of the Clinton 12 were terrorized, with guns and dynamite used at their homes and businesses. The violence became so severe that many of the Clinton 12 withdrew from the school. The Clinton principal's family, as well as some of the Clinton 12 families, fled the town for their safety.

The few of the Clinton 12 that remained had to be escorted to school. Paul Turner, a White pastor who escorted the group on December 4, 1956, was attacked and badly beaten by a White mob. This caused the school to close completely for about a week. Clinton saw most of its violence during the first few months after the initial integration with the Clinton 12.

Just two years after the Clinton 12 first integrated the high school, after a period of steady escalation in racial tensions, Clinton High School was bombed and destroyed on October 5, 1958.

== Legacy ==
Due to all the violence and opposition, only two of the Clinton 12 graduated from Clinton High School. Bobby Cain, in 1957, was the first Black man to graduate from Clinton High School, and Gail Ann Epps, in 1958, was the first Black woman. After fundraising by the local community and Reverend Billy Graham, enough funds were collected to rebuild Clinton High School and it opened back up in 1960. After the opening of the new school, there were no major reports or incidents of violence and discrimination. The integration of the Clinton 12 set precedents in the American education system, especially in the South and Appalachian regions of the US.

The Disney Channel, as part of Disney Citizenship, partnered with Størmerlige Films to produce a series of micro-videos to spotlight important stories for Black History Month, including that of the Clinton 12. Cameron Boyce, a rising Disney star, presented the short film, which centered on the experience of his grandmother, Jo Ann Allen Boyce, one of the Clinton 12.
