= Seiver =

Seiver or Seivers is a surname. Notable people with the surname include:

- Scott Seiver (born 1985), American poker player
- Larry Seivers (born 1954), American football player
