= Clinton High School (Clinton, Tennessee) =

School in Tennessee, United States

- Clinton High School Dragon

Location
- 425 Dragon Dr; Clinton, Tennessee 37716; 36.09448°N 84.14456°W

Information
- Type: Comprehensive Public High School
- Established: 1903
- School district: Anderson County
- Principal: Robbie Herrell
- Teaching staff: 72.54 (FTE)
- Grades: 9-12
- Enrollment: 1,073 (2023-2024)
- Student to teacher ratio: 14.79
- Campus type: Medium Town
- Colors: and
- Mascot: Dragon
- Website: chs.acs.ac

Clinton High School in Clinton, Tennessee, is the Anderson County, Tennessee, high school that serves students living in and near Clinton, Oliver Springs, and Claxton. As of 2025, the student population is about 86 percent white, and 14 percent other groups including blacks and hispanics.

== History ==
1806 Union Academy, a state-sponsored institution, was chartered for Anderson County.

1820s Union Academy began operations. A wooden structure was built on South Main Street in Clinton.

1860s Union Academy was destroyed by fire during the American Civil War.

1868 A new Union Academy was constructed on the present site of Clinton Elementary School.

1895 The newly established Clinton City School system took over operations of the Academy building. By this time, the Academy was already being referred to as Clinton High School.

1903 A new brick Clinton High School was built on the current location of Clinton Elementary School.

1916–17 The first basketball teams were formed at Clinton High School (Men's & Women's).

1923–24 The first football team was organized at Clinton High School. They were known as the Orange and Black “Tornadoes.”

1927 A new high school building, which consolidated CHS with several county schools, was opened at the current location of Clinton Middle School. The city school system turned over operations of CHS to the county school system. At some point, the mascot was changed to “Dragons.”

1954 Clinton High School first accredited by the Southern Association of Colleges and Schools (SACS).

1956 Clinton High School is integrated under federal court order. Protests ensue. The Clinton 12, as the school's black students were known endure threats and attacks. The school is destroyed by dynamite (See Integration below)

1958 On Sunday, October 5, the school was blown apart by three massive explosions.

1958–60 CHS students were transported to Oak Ridge to continue classes while the school was rebuilt.

1963 Plans were presented to consolidate several elementary schools, create 2 junior high schools, and construct a new Clinton Senior High School for grades 10-12.

1968–69 Clinton Senior High School was completed.

1977 Vocational programs were offered to CSHS students as the Anderson County Center of Occupational Development was opened.

1989 With the new addition of a library, science labs, a cafeteria, and several new classrooms, the 9th grade was moved to CSHS which again became Clinton High School. (Clinton Junior High School and Norwood Junior High School became middle schools.)

=== Integration ===
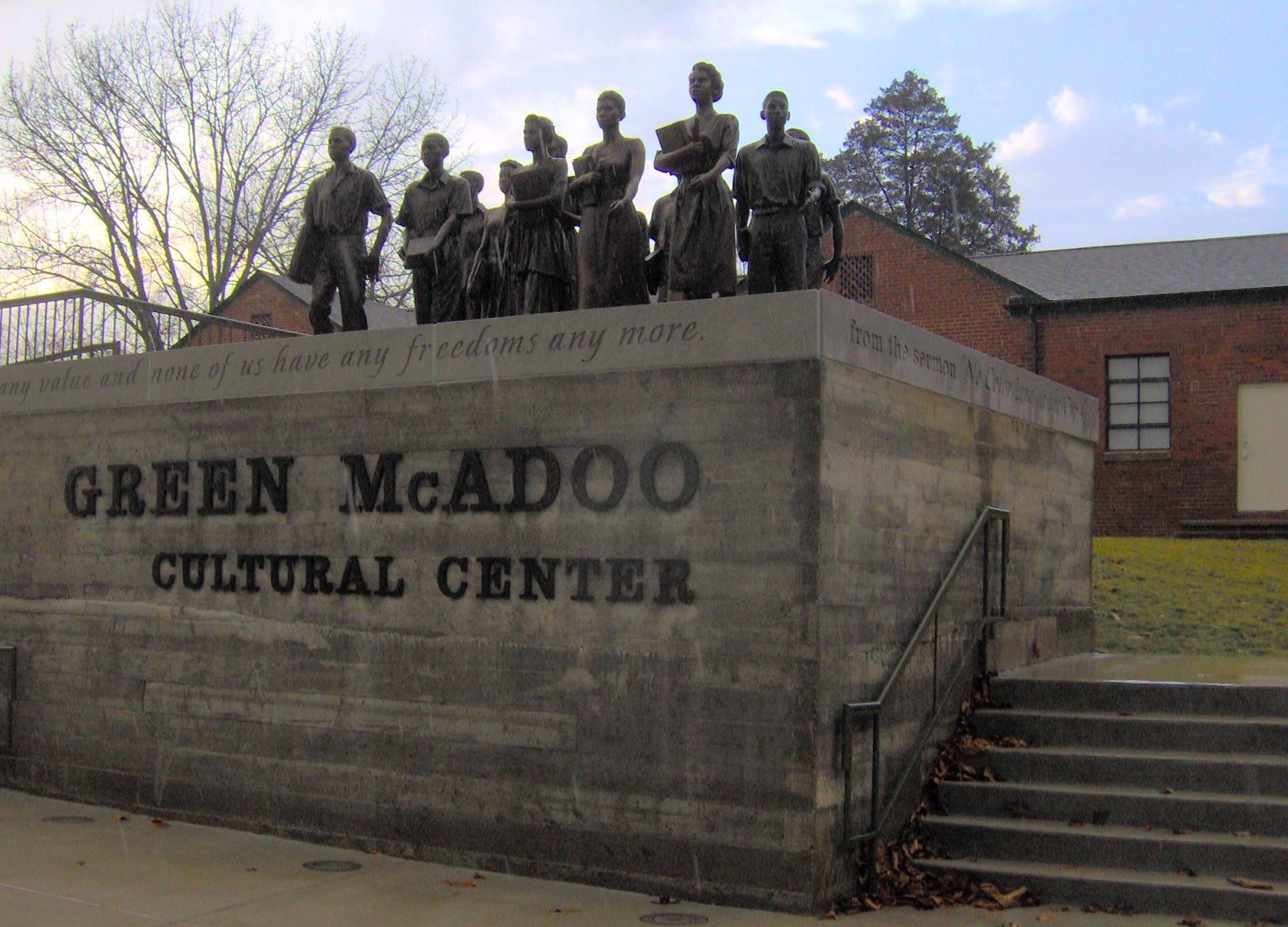
These life-size bronze statues of the twelve black students who integrated Clinton High School in 1956 stand outside the former Green McAdoo School in Clinton.

In January 1956, federal judge Robert L. Taylor ordered Clinton High School to desegregate with "all deliberate speed" in accordance with the U.S. Supreme Court's 1954 ruling in Brown v. Board of Education. On August 27, 1956, 12 African-American students became the first to integrate a previously all-white school in Tennessee. Anti-integration campaigners from inside and outside Clinton protested the decision to integrate the school. They were encouraged by New Jersey white supremacist John Kasper and Asa Carter both of whom spoke publicly in Clinton on September 1, 1956, against integration. After violence was narrowly averted on the lawn of the Anderson County Courthouse on September 1, National Guard troops were called into the city for two months to keep order. The protests resulted in a jury trial for criminal contempt, and seven of ten defendants were convicted.

The twelve black students who attended Clinton High School that fall became known as "The Clinton 12". On the morning of each school day, they walked together down Broad Street from Foley Hill to Clinton High. On the morning of December 4, 1956, Rev. Paul Turner, the white minister of the First Baptist Church, was severely beaten after escorting the twelve students to school. The twelve students were Jo Ann Boyce (née Allen), Bobby Cain, Theresser Caswell, Minnie Ann Jones (née Dickey), Gail Ann Upton (née Epps), Ronald Hayden, William Latham, Alvah J. Lambert (née McSwain), Maurice Soles, Robert Thacker, Regina Smith (née Turner), and Alfred Williams.

Early in the morning on October 5, 1958, the Clinton High School building was severely damaged by a series of dynamite explosions. An estimated 75 to 100 sticks of dynamite had been placed in three locations in the building. No one was injured, but school officials estimated damages at $300,000. The bomber was never apprehended. While the high school was being rebuilt, students were bused to Oak Ridge where classes were held in the recently vacated building that had housed Linden Elementary School. Clinton High School was reopened in September 1960.

On February 10, 2006, Bobby Cain, Maurice Soles, and Alfred Williams commemorated the 50th anniversary of the 1956 integration by reenacting their walk to school from Foley Hill. A bronze statue of the "Clinton Twelve" is now displayed outside a newly remodeled front entrance to the former Green McAdoo School, where the twelve students had attended elementary school. In February 2016, Disney Channel and sister network Disney XD aired a short for Black History Month. In the short, Disney star Cameron Boyce, the grandson of Jo Ann Boyce, one of the Clinton 12 students, talked about the school. The short also featured his grandmother, Jo Ann Boyce.

The documentary The Clinton 12 is a historical review of these events, and was aired widely on PBS in 2008 and 2009. The members of the Clinton 12 were inducted into the Clinton High School Wall of Fame in 2005 (Bobby Cain), 2007 (Gail Ann Epps Upton) and 2010.

== Athletics ==
Clinton Dragons compete in TSSAA Class AAAAA of Region 3 in Football. They compete in Class TSSAA AAA in the following sports:

- Baseball
- Men's Basketball
- Women's Basketball
- Fishing
- Football
- Men's Golf
- Women’s Golf
- Softball
- Men's Soccer
- Women's Soccer
- Track and Field
- Volleyball
- Wrestling

== Environment ==
The school is also home to a prototype solar-powered classroom called the "Net-Zero Building". The small classroom, built by students under the direction of teacher Riley Sain, allows students to watch movies and more using the power of the sun. The school has also received multiple grants from various organizations, including the TWRA, to remove rip-rap from the creek in front of the school in an effort to return it to its natural state.

== Notable alumni ==
- Charles McRae, former Tampa Bay Buccaneers and University of Tennessee lineman
- Larry Seivers, former Seattle Seahawks and University of Tennessee wide receiver
- Scott Fox, former Houston Oilers and Austin Peay State linebacker
- Bobby Cain, a member of the Clinton 12 and the first African American student to graduate from a court-ordered state-supported high school in the South. https://www.knoxvilledailysun.com/news/2022/february/clinton-twelve.html.
- Tony Colston, football player
