= The McKameys =

US musical group

- Origin: Clinton, Tennessee, U.S.
- Genres: Southern gospel
- Years active: 1954–2019
- Labels: Morningstar, Crossroads Music, Horizon

The McKameys were a Southern gospel group based in Clinton, Tennessee. On November 23, 2019, the McKameys played their last concert in Knoxville, Tennessee. The final member lineup was Ruben and Peg Bean, Sheryl Farris, Connie Fortner, Roger Fortner, and Eli Fortner.

On average, the McKameys played approximately 150 bookings annually throughout the United States and Canada. With 16 No. 1 singles, the group was honored by Horizon Records in 1999 for having the most No. 1 hits in the history of Southern Gospel music at that time.

== Group history ==
The group first organized in 1954 as a trio of sisters: Dora, Peg, and Carol McKamey. As their father was a Christian minister, the girls grew up singing in church. The sisters first performed together at church at Dora's request. While they had only planned to perform together once, they began performing at other churches or at revivals, following invitations from some of the people who had heard them sing that Sunday. It was at these Revival meetings that the sisters were discovered by "out of town evangelists". They began traveling to Florida, Indiana, and Ohio following invitations from some of the evangelists they had met.

In 1957, Ruben Bean started playing guitar for the group after the trio met him following a performance at his church. He and Peg were married two years later. Ruben and Peg's daughters, Connie and Sheryl, traveled with their parents and aunts when the group was on the road. After Dora and Carol retired from the trio in 1972, Connie and Sheryl stepped in to take over their parts. Connie married the group's bass guitarist Kenny Powell in 1979, and soon after, the group would go full-time afterward.

In the mid-1980s, Sheryl married a pastor and left the group to join her husband. At that time, Carol returned to the group, now made up of Peg, Connie, Ruben and Carol. Pretty soon, session musician Roger Fortner joined on guitar, later on marrying Connie in 1992 after she divorced Kenny Powell.

The vocal lineup of Connie, Peg, Carol, and Ruben would perform together until April 2009 when Carol Woodard officially retired from full-time travel. Sheryl Farris returned to replace Carol. Since returning, Sheryl & Connie have traded the lead vocal for a change in the vocal lineup for standards like "The Shepherd's Point of View" and "When He Speaks" and "A Hill Worth Dying On".

Over time, Eli Fortner joined his parents, Roger and Connie, on stage full-time as a guitarist and featured vocalist. Eli's solos appear on every project since their 2005 release, The Old Path. In 2012, Roger Fortner stepped up to sing a solo, "Unspoken Request". Much to the delight of fans, Roger's first solo captured the No. 1 spot on the January 2013 Singing News Top 80 Charts and received nominations for Song of the Year in the 2013 Singing News Fan Awards and 2013 NQC Music Awards.

In September 2018, The McKameys announced on singingnews.com in an open letter that November 2019 would be the end of their full-time touring.

In February 2021, Roger, Connie, and Eli Fortner announced they would be performing as McKamey Legacy. On December 26, 2023, The McKameys announced that Peg McKamey Bean had died in the early morning hours.

== Members ==
- Peg McKamey Bean – harmony/lead vocals (1954-2019)
- Dora McKamey Horton – lead vocals (1954-1972)
- Carol McKamey Woodard – harmony/lead vocals (1954-1972, 1984-1988, 1989-2009)
- Ruben Bean – guitars (1957–1968), bass vocals (1968-2019)
- Connie Bean Fortner – harmony/lead vocals (1972-2019)
- Sheryl Farris – harmony/lead vocals (1972-1984, 2009-2019)
- Kenny Powell – bass guitar (19??-198?)
- Kenny Ambrose –bass guitar (198?-198?)
- Phil Pyke – guitars (1982-198?, 1990–199?)
- Ricky Francis – bass guitar (1986-1992)
- Roger Fortner – guitars (1987-2019)
- Bonnie White – harmony/lead vocals (1988-1989)
- Bryant Williams – piano (199?–199?)
- Jerry Kelso – piano (1992)
- Jeff Treece – piano (1994-1996)
- Eli Fortner (1999-2019)
- Randall Hunley – piano

== Discography ==
Albums List
- 1968: The Family Prayer
- 1969: What a Day That Will Be
- 1970: Jesus is Coming Soon
- 1970: You've Gotta Live Like Jesus
- 1971: The Old Rugged Cross Made the Difference
- 1972: Hold to God's Unchanging Hand (Trail)
- 1973: Let Me Walk With You Jesus (Trail)
- 1974: Joy in the Morning (Trail)
- 1975: We Love Him Too Much (To Fail Him Now) (Trail)
- 1976: On Business for the King (Trail)
- 1977: Lord I Know How Much You Love Me (Trail)
- 1978: On the Way Up (Trail)
- 1979: At Home (Night Watch)
- 1980: Live (Night Watch)
- 1981: Genuine (Night Watch)
- 1981: He Didn't Let Us Down (MorningStar)
- 1982: By Faith (MorningStar)
- 1983: Keepsake (MorningStar)
- 1984: Tennessee Live! (MorningStar)
- 1985: Fruitful (MorningStar)
- 1986: Unique (MorningStar)
- 1987: More Than Music (MorningStar)
- 1987: Christmas (MorningStar)
- 1988: Covered by Love (Morning Star)
- 1988: Gone to Meetin' Live (MorningStar)
- 1989: Sing Praises (MorningStar)
- 1990: Purpose (MorningStar)
- 1991: Just Thinking (MorningStar)
- 1992: Visions (compilation) (MorningStar)
- 1992: With Feeling Live (Horizon)
- 1993: With His Power (Horizon)
- 1994: It's Real (Horizon)
- 1995: Sheltered (Horizon)
- 1995: Gifts (Horizon)
- 1997: Still Have a Song (Horizon)
- 1998: Remembrance (Horizon)
- 1998: Always (Horizon)
- 2000: Waiting (Horizon)
- 2001: I've Won (Horizon)
- 2002: Trophy of Grace (Horizon)
- 2003: An Acoustic Journey (Horizon)
- 2004: Fresh Manna (Horizon)
- 2005: The Old Path (Horizon)
- 2007: Telling the Story (Horizon)
- 2008: Something More (Horizon)
- 2009: The Message (Horizon)
- 2011: Joy in the Journey (Horizon)
- 2012: Precious Seed (Horizon)
- 2013: A Song Every Day (Horizon)
- 2014: 50 (Horizon) The fiftieth recording by The McKameys
- 2015: What If (Horizon)
- 2016: Something Worth Saving (Horizon)
- 2017: Be Brave (Horizon)
- 2019: The Crown (Horizon)
- 2020: Live Like No Other (Horizon)
- 2023: Greatest Hits (Horizon)

Singles List
- 1982: "Burning the Midnight Oil" (No. 19)
- 1984: "Who Put the Tears (In the Eyes of the Lamb?)" (No. 1)
  - "Somebody Prayed for Me"
  - "Tarry Here" (No. 4)
  - "Bring Me out of the Desert" (No. 5)
  - "The Bride Coming In" (No. 4)
  - "I'm Going Through" (No. 10)
- 1987: "Getting Used to the Dark" (No. 1)
  - "No More Sea" (No. 12)
- 1988: "God on the Mountain" (No. 1)
  - "Ground Breaking" (No. 10)
  - "Under His Feet" (No. 2)
- 1991: "God Will Make This Trial a Blessing" (No. 1)
  - "Handfuls of Purpose" (No. 16)
  - "Somehow He Will" (No. 27)
  - "The Rising of the Son" (No. 5)
  - "Vision of Heaven" (No. 35)
- 1993: "Do You Know How It Feels?" (No. 1)
- 1993: "A Borrowed Tomb" (No. 1)
- 1994: "Arise" (No. 1)
  - "Prayer Changes Me" (No. 2)
  - "I'm Going Through, Jesus" (No. 3)
  - "A Voice Within" (No. 6)
  - "How Deep Is the Sea?" (No. 3)
  - "The Old Love Letter" (No. 3)
- 1997: "Right on Time" (No. 1)
  - "This Valley Is for Me" (No. 3)
  - "A Wall of Prayer" (No. 3)
- 1999: "Roll That Burden on Me" (No. 1)
  - "It Satisfies Me" (No. 4)
  - "The Blood" (No. 3)
  - "Even the Valley" (No. 4)
- 2001: "I've Won" (No. 1)
- 2002: "He Calms Me" (No. 1)
  - "The Other Side" (No. 2)
  - "Surely Goodness and the Mercies of the Lord" (No. 4)
  - "A Trophy of Grace" (No. 5)
  - "Anytime" (No. 7)
  - "God Is So Good to Me" (No. 2)
- 2005: "The Good News" (No. 1)
- 2005: "I Am Home" (No. 1)
- 2006: "I Will Trust You, Lord" (No. 1)
  - "Altogether Lovely" (No. 2)
  - "You're Still God" (No. 4)
  - "You Are with Me" (No. 3)
  - "It Takes Time" (No. 32)
  - "I've Made up My Mind" (No. 9)
- 2009: "Between Twelve and Thirty-Three" (No. 1)

"I Keep Praying" (No. 1)

- 2010: "The Shepherd's Point of View" (No. 1)
- 2011: "Above and Beyond" (No. 1)
  - "When Faith Steps In" (No. 4)
  - "I Made It by Grace" (No. 4)
- 2013: "Unspoken Request" (No. 1)
  - "When He Speaks" (No. 3)
  - "Hold On" (No. 11)
  - "A Hill Worth Dying On" (No. 4)
  - "There Is Jesus"(No.3)
  - "Pure Satisfaction”(No.1)

Videos/DVDs List
- 1988: Gone To Meetin’
- 1989: Sing Praises
- 1991: On Tour
- 1992: With Feeling, Live!
- 1994: With His Power
- 1996: Encourage
- 1999: Genuine
- 2000: Who We Are
- 2001: Hometown Live!
- 2003: Renfro Valley Live
- 2006: The Old Path Live
- 2006: Christmas
- 2008: Something More Live
- 2011: Journey
- 2019: Sincerely
- 2020: Like No Other

== Awards ==
- 1989: Singing News Fan Awards Female Vocalist of the Year – Peg McKamey Bean
- 1989: Singing News Fan Awards Song of the Year – "God on the Mountain" (Tracy Dartt)
- 1990: Singing News Fan Awards Female Vocalist of the Year – Peg McKamey Bean
- 1991: Singing News Fan Awards Female Vocalist of the Year – Peg McKamey Bean
- 1992: Singing News Fan Awards Female Vocalist of the Year – Peg McKamey Bean
- 1993: Singing News Fan Awards Female Vocalist of the Year – Peg McKamey Bean
- 1994: Singing News Fan Awards Female Vocalist of the Year – Peg McKamey Bean
- 1994: Singing News Fan Awards Song of the Year – "Arise" (Roger Ealey)
- 2001: Marvin Norcross Award – Ruben Bean
- 2002: Singing News Fan Awards Female Vocalist of the Year – Peg McKamey Bean
- 2003: Singing News Fan Awards Video of the Year – Hometown Live!
- 2012: Norcross-Templeton Award – Peg McKamey Bean
- 2016: Southern Gospel Music Hall of Fame Inductee – Peg McKamey Bean
- 2019: Southern Gospel Museum and Hall of Fame Inductee – Ruben Bean
- 2025: Volunteer State Music Hall of Fame Inductee – The McKameys
