= Scott Fox (American football) =

American football player (1963–2015)

No. 59
- Position: Linebacker

Personal information
- Born: December 28, 1963; Knoxville, Tennessee, U.S.
- Died: June 16, 2015 (aged 51); Nashville, Tennessee, U.S.
- Listed height: 6 ft 2 in (1.88 m)
- Listed weight: 222 lb (101 kg)

Career information
- High school: Clinton (Clinton, Tennessee)
- College: Austin Peay State
- NFL draft: 1987: undrafted

Career history
- Houston Oilers (1987)

Career NFL statistics
- Sacks: 1
- Stats at Pro Football Reference

Scott Fox (December 28, 1963 – June 16, 2015) was an American professional football linebacker in the National Football League (NFL). He was a replacement player for the Houston Oilers during the players strike in the 1987 NFL season. He played football at Clinton Senior High School in Clinton, Tennessee, graduating in 1981. He played college football at Austin Peay State. He was 6'2" and weighed 222 lbs. in his playing time.

== Personal life ==
Fox was born on December 28, 1963 in Knoxville, Tennessee and attended Clinton High School. After leaving football, he worked in car sales, and lived in Nashville, Tennessee. He was married and had three daughters. He died on June 16, 2015.
