= John Kasper =

American politician (1929–1998)

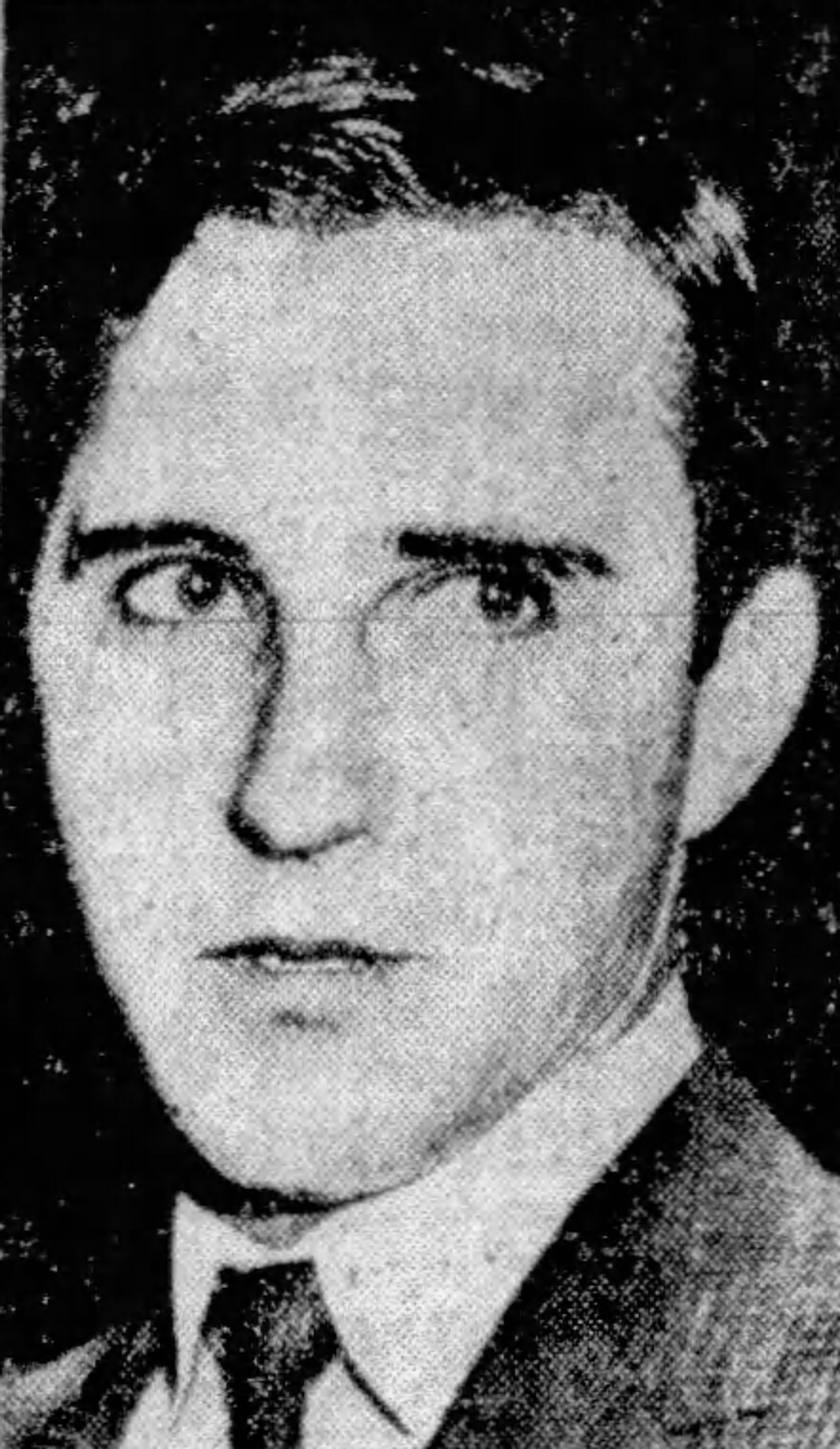
- Kasper in 1957
- Born: October 21, 1929; Merchantville, New Jersey, U.S.
- Died: April 7, 1998 (aged 68); Osteen, Florida, U.S.
- Education: Columbia University
- Political party: National States' Rights Party

Frederick John Kasper Jr. (October 21, 1929 – April 7, 1998) was an American politician, Ku Klux Klan member, and a segregationist who took a militant stand against racial integration during the civil rights movement.

== Life ==
FBI teletype sent immediately after the Hebrew Benevolent Congregation Temple bombing, instructing agents to "thoroughly account for the whereabouts of Frederick John Kasper" before and after the time of the explosion

Raised in Merchantville, New Jersey, and educated at Columbia University, Kasper became a devotee of Ezra Pound and corresponded with the poet as a student. Between 1950 and 1963, Kasper sent 400 letters to Pound and received an unknown number of replies (Pound's letters to Kasper are lost). In the letters Kasper identifies with Pound and, within a short time of beginning the correspondence, he considered himself Pound's main disciple.

Directed by Pound, Kasper began a small press (Square Dollar Series) in 1951, to publish works Pound favored. In 1953, Kasper opened the Make It New bookshop in Greenwich Village, displaying Pound's letters in the shop window. Kasper campaigned against racial integration in the Southern United States, calling it a Jewish plot. In those activities and others, Kasper believed he was disseminating the poet's ideas. Pound's association with Kasper caused chagrin among those who were attempting to have Pound released from St. Elizabeths Hospital, where he was incarcerated on charges of treason.

After running the bookshop in Greenwich Village, Kasper moved to Washington, D.C.. Imbibing Pound's right-wing ideas, Kasper formed the Seaboard Citizens Council immediately after the ruling of the Supreme Court in the Brown v. Board of Education case, with the aim of preventing desegregation in Washington.

During the 1970s, Kasper returned to Merchantville, New Jersey, where he had grown up. In this time, he worked as an accountant for a train company. Also at this time, he fathered a child. His daughter, named Ruthanne Rose, was born in December 1978. After she was born, Kasper left the area.

Kasper was known to be in Florida and North Carolina for a time. He married a woman in 1992 and had another child in 1995 before his death in 1998.

== Defense of segregation ==
Kasper came to public attention during the integration of Clinton High School in Clinton, Tennessee. He sought to mobilize opponents of the desegregation order, and was arrested during the resulting unrest. Kasper was acquitted of inciting a riot and sedition. The jury included members who served on the arresting auxiliary police force. The courtroom broke out in cheers when the verdict was read.

As a result of this incident, Kasper became a focal point at similar protests across the Southern United States, often an unwelcome one. While he was campaigning, Kasper was jailed for crimes ranging from inciting a riot to loitering. He was a suspect in a school bombing in Nashville as well as multiple synagogue bombings—he was a virulent antisemite—although no evidence was provided to link him directly to any of the cases.

In 1956, Kasper was under a court order to desist from obstructing desegregation, which he ignored, prompting his arrest and those of 15 other segregationists. In 1957, Kasper was found guilty of contempt of court and sentenced to one year in jail. At Kasper's trial, an enthusiastic supporter of his, Joe Diehl, a Knoxville farmer and a leader of the Knoxville Citizens Council, distributed The Coming Red Dictatorship, which claimed that "Asiatic Marxist Jews" were taking over the world, to several people, including the prosecutor. Diehl himself compared the round-up of segregationists to the government enforcing a communist dictatorship. As he was leaving the courtroom, the prosecutor had a federal marshal arrest him. After being told about the incident, the judge sentenced Diehl to 30 days in jail for contempt of court.

Of the 16 segregationists arrested, one died in a mental hospital, while four others had the charges against them dropped. In 1957, Kasper and six of the others segregationists were found guilty of contempt in a mass trial. Several of the defendants were visibly shocked after being found guilty, while Kasper was angry, muttering "It's difficult to understand." Kasper had six months added to his sentence, while his codefendants all received probationary terms ranging from one to two years. The maximum sentence had been six months and a $1,000 fine. The judge believed that Kasper, whom he viewed as an agitator, was the most culpable defendant, telling him that "I am confident that these east Tennesseans would not be before me now if it had not been for you."

After losing his appeals, Kasper was sent to prison in November 1957, serving eight months of his sentence for his first conviction. Following his release, he said he had been "treated fine" and that "the only trouble was it was completely integrated." He was originally scheduled to be released from a prison in Tallahassee, Florida, but was transferred to the United States Penitentiary, Atlanta after officials learned that supporters in the Ku Klux Klan were planning a celebration party outside. Those left waiting in vain included Klan leader James W. "Catfish" Cole, who'd received national attention for his role in the Battle of Hayes Pond, in which hundreds of Lumbee Indians had violently broken up a Klan rally in North Carolina, shooting and wounding four Klansmen.

In November 1958, a state court in Nashville found Kasper guilty of inciting a riot. He was sentenced to six months in a workhouse and fined $500. In July 1959, he reported back to prison to serve his sentence for his second conviction. While in prison, he was punched in the face by a black prisoner. In January 1960, Kasper reported to the Davidson County Jail to serve his sentence on his state conviction. His request to not serve his sentence at a workhouse was granted, after he complained that "racial conflict" could occur among inmates of the "integrated" workhouse if he was forced to serve his sentence there. The jail and workhouse technically had whites and blacks living in separate quarters, albeit it was harder to maintain complete segregation in the workhouse. Kasper was released from jail on July 15, 1960.

Upon his release, Kasper called for a return to Constitutionalism, and the creation of a third party to oppose the integration which he said was now supported by both the Democrats and Republicans. He became associated with the National States' Rights Party and ran in the 1964 Presidential election with J.B. Stoner as his running mate. Kasper attracted negligible support: just 6,434 votes in just two states, Kentucky and Arkansas.

== Later life and death ==
Kasper returned to his northern roots in 1967 and effectively left politics, settling down to family life and a series of clerical jobs, the last being as an auditor for TTX. He died on April 7, 1998, at the age of 68 when his boat capsized. He was survived by his wife, Tram Houng, and three children.

Preceded by Orval Faubus	National States' Rights Party Presidential candidate 1964 (lost)	Succeeded by none
