= Scott Fox (author) =

American financial and self-help author

- Born: Detroit, Michigan, United States
- Education: University of Michigan (B.A.), Stanford University School of Law (J.D.)
- Occupations: Financial entrepreneurship and self-help author, serial entrepreneur, angel investor, founder at ClickMillionaires.com, RadioGuestList.com, OC Startup Council.
- Website: www.ScottFox.com

Scott Fox is an American financial and self-help author, specializing in entrepreneurship and startup company advice. He is a serial Internet entrepreneur, startup advisor, media personality, and angel investor. Founder of the OC Startup Council, the Click Millionaire's MasterMinds Forum at ClickMillionaires.com, and RadioGuestList.com among many other niche website businesses, Fox is best known for his books which have been translated into many languages worldwide. These include Internet Riches: The Simple Money-making Secrets of Online Millionaires, E-Riches 2.0, and Click Millionaires: Work Less, Live More with an Internet Business You Love.

== Early life and education ==
Fox grew up in inner-city Detroit where he graduated from Cass Technical High School. He received his bachelor's degree in management from the University of Michigan before being recruited to New York by JP Morgan & Company. He began his career as an investment banker on Wall Street. He then returned to school, earning a Juris Doctor degree from Stanford University School of Law and attending the Stanford Graduate School of Business in the 1990s. He spent some time as a lawyer and CFO in the entertainment industry, and some working on start-ups in Silicon Valley before starting his own companies. Today he is active as a community organizer for the startup ecosystem online and in Southern California as the CEO of the Orange County Startup Council, as well as an angel investor via Tech Coast Angels and startup advisor to early stage ventures worldwide.

== Writing ==
Scott Fox is the bestselling author of three books: Internet Riches, E-Riches 2.0, and Click Millionaires. Each of these books is written to help new entrepreneurs use software, Internet marketing tools, and e-commerce to start an online business.

- Internet Riches: The Simple Money-making Secrets of Online Millionaires (2008)
- E-Riches 2.0: Next Generation Online Marketing Strategies (2009)
- Click Millionaires: Work Less, Live More with an Internet Lifestyle Business You Love (2012)

== Other business ventures ==
In addition to being an author, Fox is an advisor and investor in startups, a serial start-up entrepreneur, an executive, and a podcaster. He has built multimillion-dollar e-businesses ranging from niche online ventures, to Silicon Valley venture capital-backed startups and Fortune 500 corporate web sites, to sites for celebrities like Bill O’Reilly and Larry King.

== Charitable causes ==
The profits from Fox's books are donated to charity.

== Personal life ==
Fox currently resides in California with his family.
