= Melton Hill Dam =

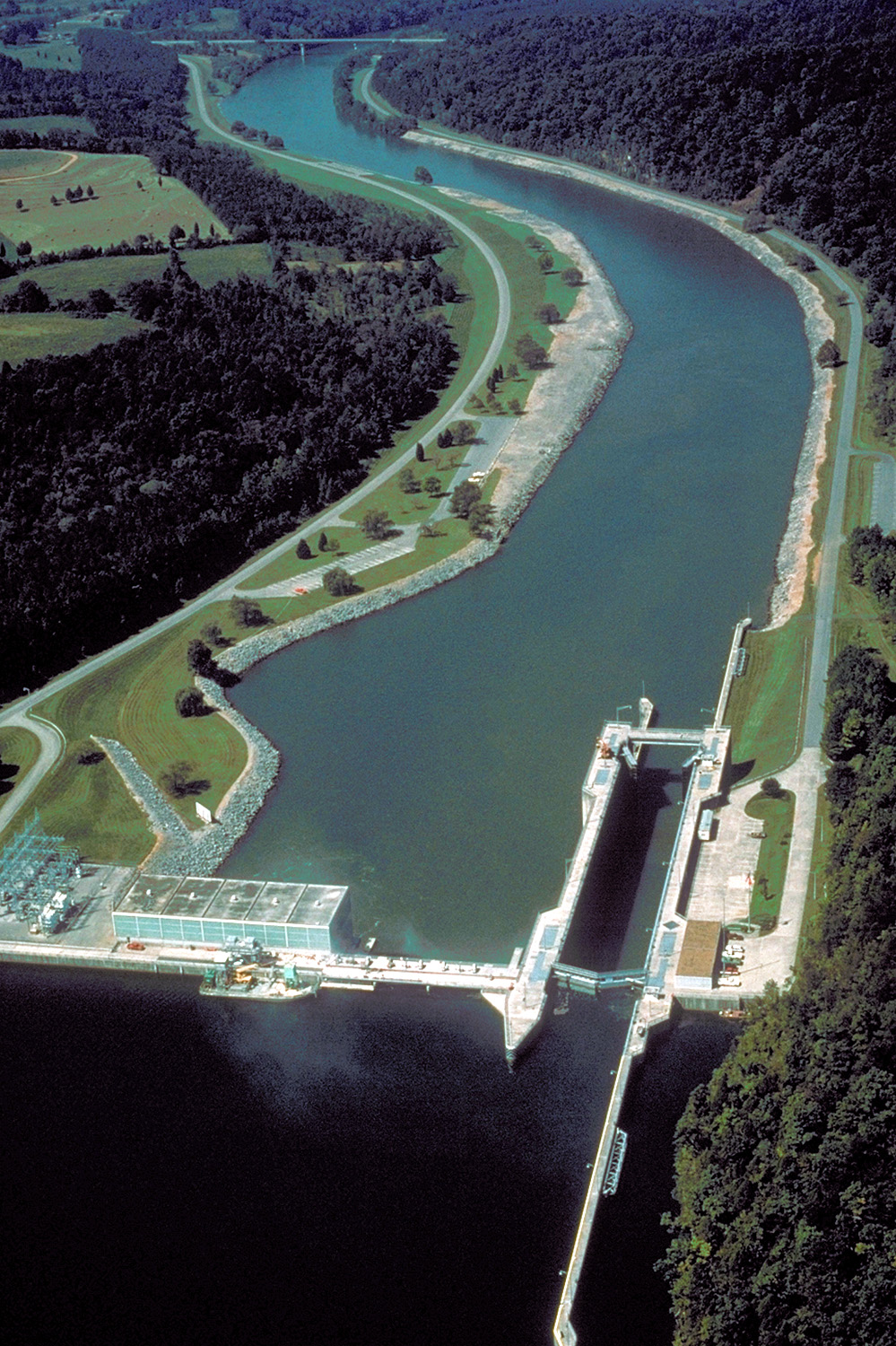
- Melton Hill Lock and Dam. View is downriver to the west. The Tennessee State Route 95 bridge can be seen downriver.
- Official name: Melton Hill Dam
- Location: Oak Ridge, Tennessee and Lenoir City, Tennessee
- Coordinates: 35°53′7″N 84°18′0″W
- Construction began: September 6, 1960
- Opening date: May 1, 1963
- Operator(s): Tennessee Valley Authority

Dam and spillways
- Impounds: Clinch River
- Height: 103 feet (31 m)
- Length: 1,020 feet (310 m)

Reservoir
- Creates: Melton Hill Lake

Power Station
- Turbines: 2
- Installed capacity: 72 MW

Melton Hill Dam is a hydroelectric dam on the Clinch River just south of Oak Ridge, Tennessee, United States. The dam is operated by the Tennessee Valley Authority, which built the dam in the early 1960s to extend the Tennessee Valley's continuous navigation channel up the Clinch as far as Clinton and to increase TVA's overall power-generating capacity. The dam impounds the 5,470-acre (2,210 ha) Melton Hill Lake, and is the only TVA tributary dam serviced by a navigation lock. The dam and associated infrastructure were listed on the National Register of Historic Places in 2017.

Melton Hill Dam was named for a knob atop nearby Copper Ridge where the United States Coast and Geodetic Survey installed a triangulation station in 1884.

== Location ==
The Clinch River flows southwestward for 300 miles (480 km) from its source in southwestern Virginia through the hills of northeastern Tennessee before emptying into the Tennessee River at Kingston. Melton Hill Dam is located 23 miles (37 km) upstream from the mouth of the Clinch, stretching across the Roane-Loudon county line. Melton Hill's tailwaters are part of Watts Bar Lake, a main Tennessee River channel impoundment that extends across the lower 23 miles (37 km) of the Clinch. Melton Hill is the newer of two dams on the lower Clinch, the other being Norris Dam, located 56 miles (90 km) upstream from Melton Hill.

== Capacity ==
Melton Hill is a concrete gravity-type dam with an electric power generation capacity of 79 megawatts. The dam is 103 feet (31 m) high and stretches 1,020 feet (311 m) across the Clinch River. The dam is equipped with a 3-bay spillway that has a total discharge of 118,000 cubic feet (3,341 cubic meters) per second.

Melton Hill Lake provides nearly 193 miles (311 km) of shoreline and 5,470 acres (22 km²) of water surface for navigation and recreation, and includes parts of Loudon, Roane, Anderson, and Knox counties. The reservoir stretches 56 miles (90 km) up the Clinch from the dam to the base of Norris Dam, and is navigable for 38 miles (61 km) from Melton Hill Dam to Clinton.

Melton Hill is the only TVA dam on a tributary stream (i.e., not on the Tennessee River) with a navigation lock. The lock is 75 feet (23 m) x 400 feet (120 m), and lowers and raises vessels 60 feet (18 m) between Melton Hill Lake and Watts Bar Lake and vice versa.

== Background and construction ==
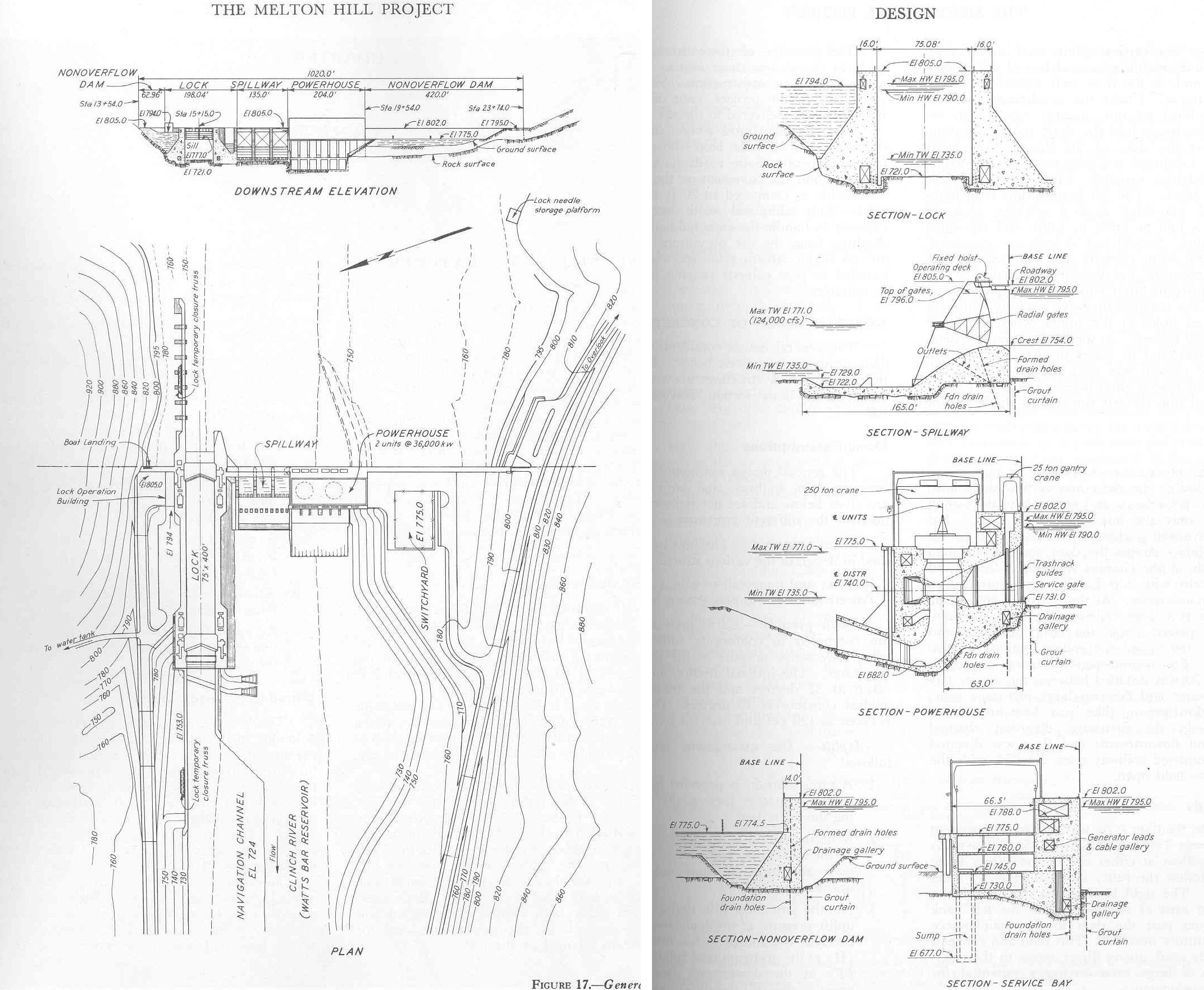
Design plan for Melton Hill Dam, c. 1960

The U.S. Army Corps of Engineers recognized the dam potential of the Melton Hill site as early as the 1920s, and the Tennessee Valley Authority began investigating the site as part of its lower Clinch Valley surveys in the late 1930s. TVA first proposed the Melton Hill project in 1957, and after several years of lobbying, Congress agreed to fund the dam's construction. President Dwight D. Eisenhower signed the funding bill into law on September 2, 1960, and TVA began building the dam on September 6, 1960.

The construction of Melton Hill Dam and its reservoir required the purchase of 6,182 acres (2,502 ha) of land, 2,182 acres (883 ha) of which— mostly situated along the river's west bank immediately upstream from the dam site— were in possession of the Atomic Energy Commission. The commission agreed to give this land to TVA in exchange for lands further downstream along Watts Bar Lake. The AEC also agreed to pay for the reconstruction of Oak Ridge's raw water intake after TVA accused them of building it without their approval, in violation of the TVA Act. 89 families and 12.5 miles (20.1 km) of roads were relocated. The project's most problematic relocation issue involved an experimental farm operated by the Agricultural Research Laboratory, a joint initiative of the AEC and the University of Tennessee. To replace the farm, TVA purchased and paid for the re-seeding of an 886-acre (359 ha) plot nearby above reservoir operating levels.

Melton Hill Dam was completed and its gates closed on May 1, 1963. Its first generator went online July 3, 1964, and its second generator went online November 11, 1964. The dam's lock was designed by the Army Corps of Engineers, which based the design on the Corps' Old Hickory Dam lock in Middle Tennessee. The Melton Hill lock is bigger than the typical 60x360-foot locks used by TVA's Tennessee River dams, allowing Melton Hill to accommodate several barges simultaneously. The lock was placed in service June 10, 1963.

== See also ==
- National Register of Historic Places listings in Loudon County, Tennessee
