= Sharps Chapel, Tennessee =

Unincorporated community in Union County, Tennessee, United States

- Unincorporated community
- Sharps Chapel
- Location within Tennessee Location within the United States
- Coordinates: 36°20′37″N 83°48′15″W
- Country: United States
- State: Tennessee
- County: Union
- Settled: 1770s
- Elevation: 1,043 ft (318 m)

Population (2018)
  - Total: 1,500
- Time zone: UTC-5 (Eastern (EST))
  - Summer (DST): UTC-4 (EDT)
- ZIP code: 37866
- Area code: 865
- FIPS code: 47-47173
- GNIS feature ID: 1647534

Sharps Chapel is an unincorporated community in southwestern Union County, Tennessee, along the northern shore of Norris Lake.

== History ==
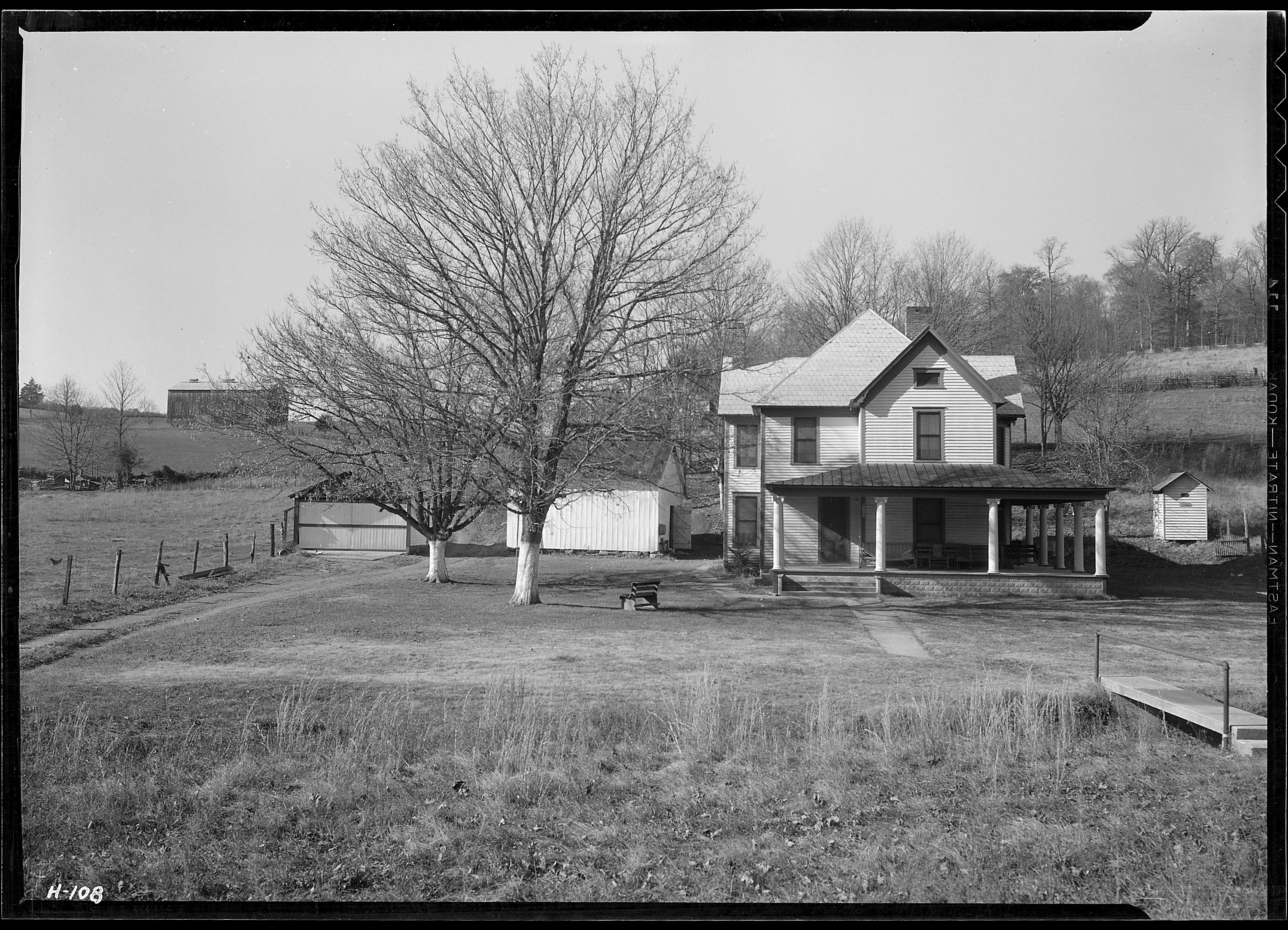
The homestead of Sherman Stiner, which was among the hundreds of families displaced in Sharps Chapel by the TVA for Norris Dam

American Revolutionary War veteran Henry Sharp settled in the area on a 700-acre (280 ha) land grant. According to another source, the community's namesake may be Peter Sharp, the son of Henry Sharp.

A post office was established in the area in 1866 and has operated continuously since that time. Initially the post office was called "Clinch River," but in 1869, the name was changed to Sharps Chapel. Sharps Chapel is assigned zip code 37866.

During the construction of Norris Dam in the 1930s, the community was the site of a Civilian Conservation Corps camp, housing workers for the dam project and the development of the nearby Norris Dam State Park.

The Bait Ousley house in Sharps Chapel has been listed in the National Register of Historic Places since 1978. This brick Federal style house was built by Jacob Sharp, a son of Henry Sharp, in 1835. The house was sold to Jacob Ousley in 1874 and remained in his family for 132 years, but it was unoccupied for almost 30 years beginning in the 1970s, and was considered to be a haunted house. In 2006, the house was purchased from one of Ousley's descendants, and the new owners began an extensive restoration.

== Geography ==
Sharps Chapel is located on a peninsula surrounded by the Clinch and Powell impoundment Norris Lake on all sides in northernmost Union County. It is 40 miles northeast of the city of Knoxville.

It is the site of the administrative office for Chuck Swan State Forest, a forested tract of more than 24,000 acres (9,800 ha) located between the Clinch River and Powell River arms of Norris Lake, that is jointly managed by the Tennessee Forestry Division and Tennessee Wildlife Resources Agency for wildlife habitat and forest stand improvement.

== Demographics ==
In a report performed by Union County to support economic development initiatives at bringing fiber broadband to the community, the population of Sharps Chapel was estimated to be 1,500 in the year 2018.

== Economy ==
Sharps Chapel being located on the shores of Norris Lake, is the site of many waterfront communities and subdivisions. It is also the location of a marina and campground.

== Education ==
Sharps Chapel is the site of Sharps Chapel Elementary School, operated by the Union County Schools District. In the 2009–2010 school year, Sharps Chapel Elementary School enrolled 141 students in kindergarten through grade 5.

== Notable people ==
- Florence Reece - songwriter
