= Norris Lake =

Reservoir of the Norris Dam in Tennessee, United States

- Norris Reservoir
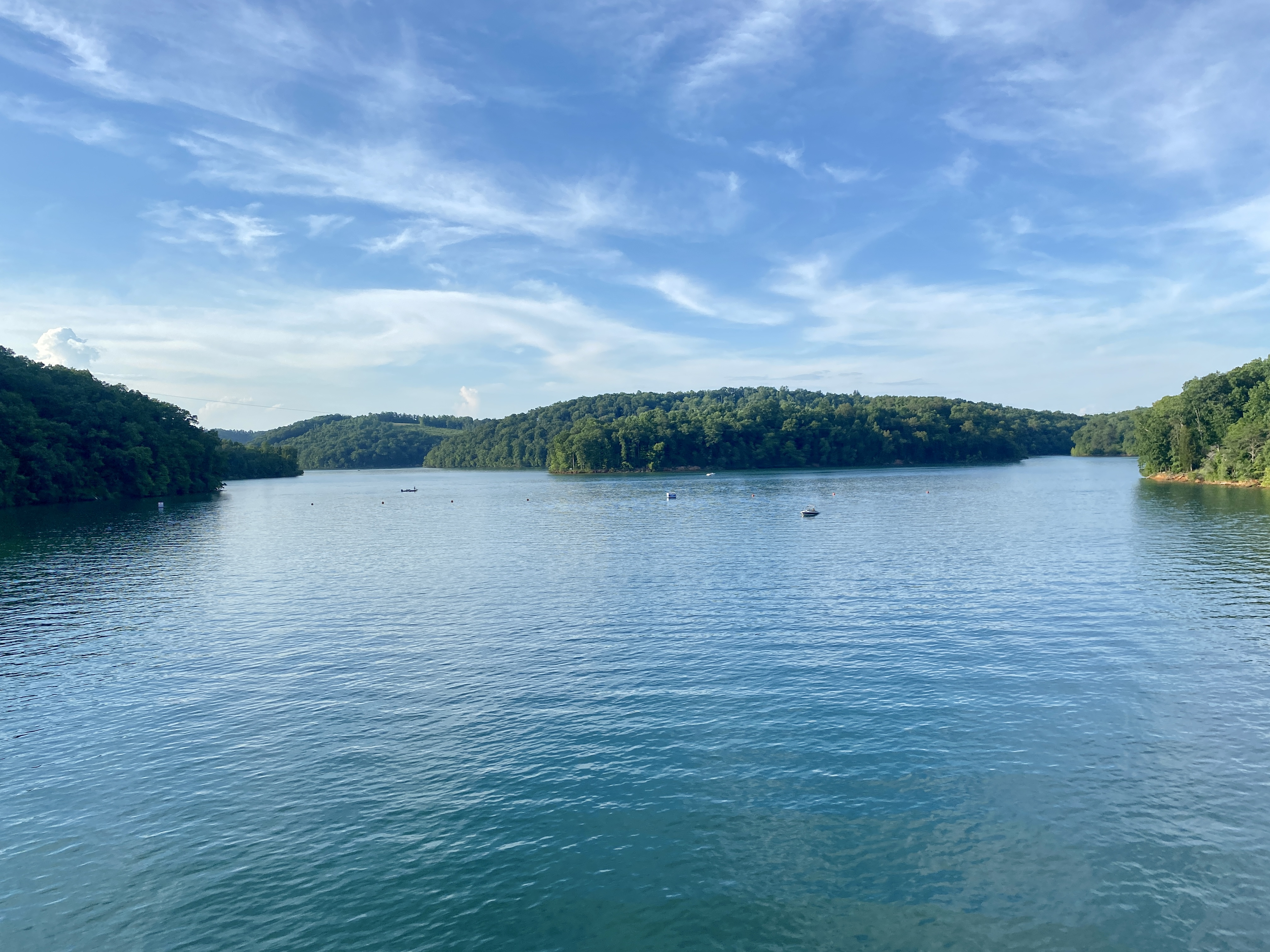
- Norris Lake from Norris Dam, Norris, TN

- Location within Tennessee Location within the United States
- Location: Anderson, Campbell, Claiborne, Grainger, and Union counties in Tennessee, United States
- Coordinates: 36.292713°N 83.910925°W
- Primary inflows: Clinch River, Powell River
- Primary outflows: Clinch River
- Max. length: 206 mi (332 km)
- Max. width: 1.2 mi (1.9 km)
- Surface area: 53.875 sq mi (137 km^{2})
- Average depth: 75 ft (23 m)
- Max. depth: 210 ft (64 m)
- Shore length^{1}: 809 mi (1,302 km)
- Surface elevation: 1,020 ft (310 m)
- ^{1} Shore length is not a well-defined measure.

Norris Lake, also known as Norris Reservoir, is a reservoir in Tennessee, US. The lake was created by the Norris Dam at the Cove Creek Site on the Clinch River in 1936 by the Tennessee Valley Authority (TVA) for flood control, water storage, and hydroelectric power. Norris Dam and its reservoir were the first major project taken on by the TVA. The lake, the dam, and the town of Norris, Tennessee are named for George W. Norris, who was a U.S. Senator from Nebraska and who wrote the legislation that created the TVA.

== History ==
Norris Lake was created by the Norris Dam, which was the first project taken on by the TVA as part of the New Deal. Construction began in 1933, and the project was finished in March 1936. The dam cost about $36 million to build. The dam is 265 feet (80.7 m) high, and extends 1,860 feet (567 m) across the Clinch River. Construction of the dam also created the nearby town of Norris which was created to house the workers and their families. Norris Dam was primarily built for flood control in the area and it still serves that purpose today. The dam also provides electricity with two generating units, each having a generating capacity of 65.7 megawatts (a combined generating capacity of 131.4 megawatts). The power plant generated about 302 gigawatt-hours in 2007. The dam and its reservoir have a flood storage capacity of about 1,113,000 acre-feet (1,373,000,000 m^3 or 1.37 km^3).

Norris Lake extends about 73 miles (117 km) up the Clinch River and 56 miles (90 km) up the Powell River from Norris Dam. It has a flood storage capacity of about 1,113,000 acre-feet (1.37 km^3), and it has about 800 miles of shoreline and 52.9 square miles (33,840 acres) of water surface. The lake has a maximum width of about 1.2 miles and a maximum depth of 210 feet, and these make it the largest lake on a tributary of the Tennessee River.

As of 2011, Norris Lake has an ecological health rating of fair. The TVA has put into effect a clean water initiative to improve the cleanliness of the lake.

== Hydrology ==
Norris Lake has an average temperature of about 55 degrees Fahrenheit (12.7 C) in the spring, 83 degrees (28.3 C) in the summer, 56.5 degrees (13.6 C) in the fall, and 36 degrees (2.2 C) in the winter. Its region receives an average rainfall of about 4.6 inches (117 mm) per month. The lake level is at about 1,000 feet (300 m) above sea level, depending on the fluctuation of the depth of the lake, with an average input level of about 1,500 to 2,500 feet (457 to 762 m) above sea level, and an average output level of about 1,000 to 1,500 feet (300 to 457 m) above sea level. There is also an average water fluctuation of about 46 feet (14 m), day by day.

== Geology ==
Norris Lake lies in the Great Appalachian Valley of East Tennessee and its shore land covers about 375 square miles around the 52.9 square miles that the reservoir covers. The main rock formations in the land are limestone and sandstone, and because of the shifting of the land of the area, they are visible in many of the rock formations that are cut out in the hills.

== Natural history ==
=== Fish ===
Most nutrients for the fish that inhabit the lake come from the Clinch and Powell Rivers because the lake has difficulty creating its own. This is the major reason that the fish population in Norris lake is not as abundant as in other lakes in the area such as Boone Lake. Norris lake's main fish species are the black bass, the striped bass, crappie, walleye, and sunfish.

=== Vegetation ===
Norris Lake has little underwater vegetation. Stumps remain underwater from the construction of the reservoir. The Tennessee Wildlife Resources Agency (TWRA) has a program established to sink old Christmas trees to provide underwater structure for fish attraction. The vegetation type around Norris lake is known as Appalachian oak forest. The main type of forest vegetation is oak pine which includes black jack oak, chestnut oak, post oak, scarlet oak, and southern red oak inhabiting the areas that are drier. The areas around the lake that have more moist ground include trees such as white oak, southern red oak, and black oak with short leaf pine composing much of the canopy around the lake.

== Economy ==
The counties that surround the reservoir had a combined population of about 189,150 people in 2013. The main source of industry of the area surrounding the lake is agriculture, with the main cash crops being tobacco, corn, and hay. Other sources of income for the area are in the industries of garment, coal, timber, and nuclear power.^{[11]}

Norris Lake offers many recreational opportunities. It has several conservation lands such as Norris Dam State Park, The Cove Creek Wildlife Management Area, and Chuck Swan State Forest that offer hiking and other activities and protect undeveloped areas. The lake is also used for activities like waterskiing, fishing, swimming, and boating.
