= John Rice Irwin =

American historian (1930–2022)

- Born: December 11, 1930; Union County, Tennessee, U.S.
- Died: January 16, 2022 (aged 91); Clinton, Tennessee, U.S
- Education: Master's degree
- Known for: Founder of Museum of Appalachia
- Spouse: Elizabeth McDaniel (m. 1954; died 2008)
- Children: Elaine Irwin Meyer Karen Irwin

John Rice Irwin (December 11, 1930 – January 16, 2022) was an American cultural historian, and founder of the Museum of Appalachia in Norris, Tennessee.

His interest in history began at an early age, and was inspired by his grandparents to start a museum. He founded the Museum of Appalachia in 1968, which has since grown significantly in both its size and visitation. He was awarded several accolades and awards, and had eight different published books (seven of which are nationally and internationally distributed).

== Life and career ==
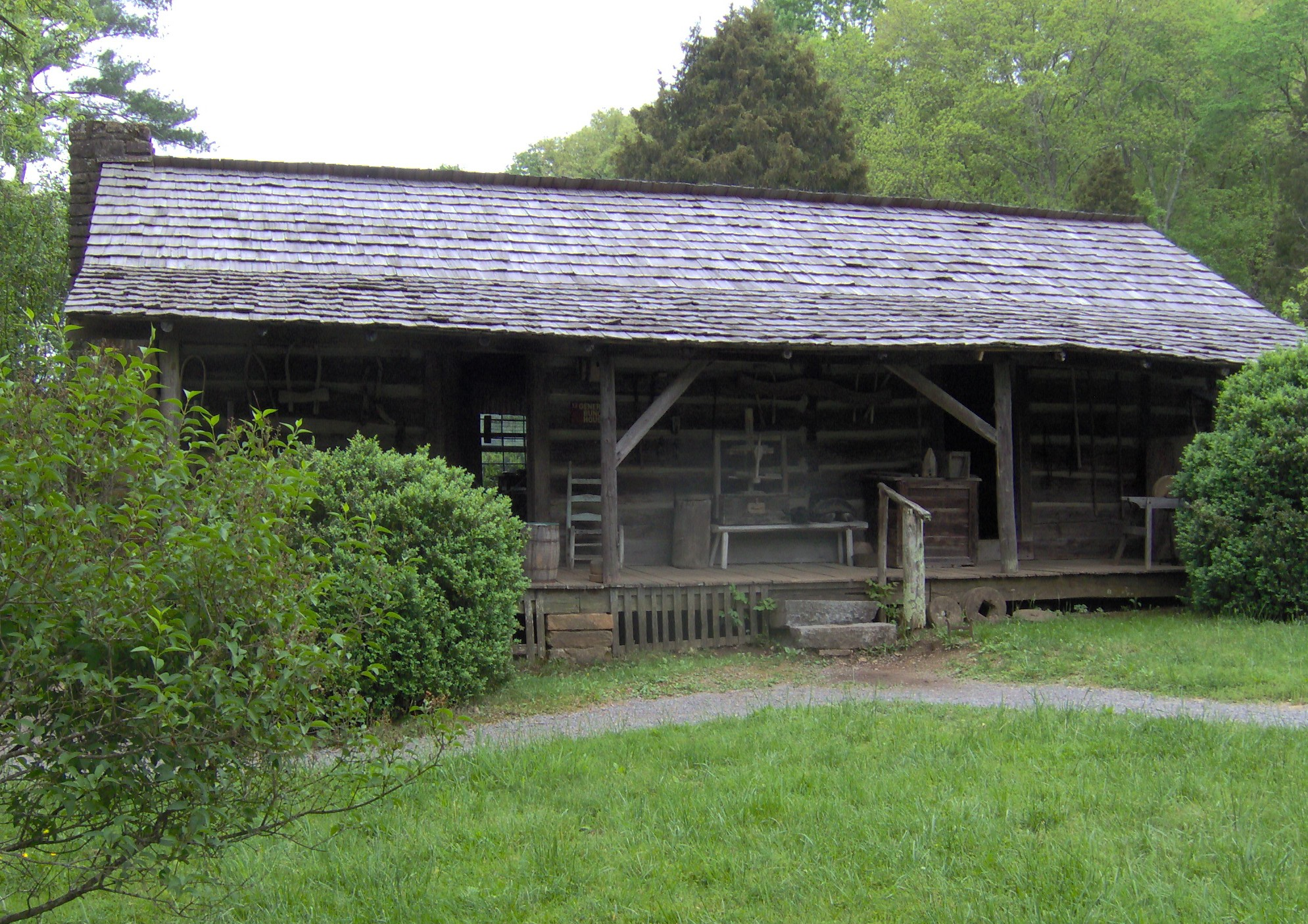
The General Bunch house, which was originally located in the New River area of Anderson County, was the first log cabin to be acquired by Irwin, reconstructed, and put on display at the site that was to become the Museum of Appalachia.

Irwin was born on December 11, 1930, in Union County, Tennessee. While he was an infant, Irwin and his family were forced to move because their land would be appropriated and flooded for the Norris Dam. After settling on another farm near Clinton, Tennessee, they were again forced to move for the development of Oak Ridge, Tennessee, in the early 1940s. They finally moved to a farm near Norris, Tennessee, where he would stay until he was 18. There, Irwin and his brother were taught how to farm, hunt, fish, and trap animals.

In the late 1940s, Irwin served in the U.S. Army infantry. He completed his bachelor's degree at Lincoln Memorial University with majors in history and economics. He earned his master's degree in international law at the University of Tennessee. At the age of 31, he was elected superintendent of schools in Anderson County, Tennessee, becoming the youngest superintendent in Tennessee. Irwin was also good friends with writer Alex Haley, and inspired one of Haley's writings with his museum. He and his wife, Elizabeth McDaniel, were married from 1954 until her death in 2008. They had two children: Elaine Meyer and Karen Erickson (died 1999), and three grandchildren. In August 2009, he announced that he was leaving his position as owner of the museum. In an interview on August 28, 2009, Irwin stated:

I'll still be around. After all, I live at the museum. My daily habits and my total life of the last 40 to 50 years have been devoted to preserving the history of our people's struggle in Appalachia. So, if you say to me that I'm retiring, well, that's what I do every night. ... I just go to sleep at my home at the museum. As in the past, I will be playing music and entertaining guests from all over the country, indeed, the world, who visit the museum. Please don't think I am going to disappear. My love for this place will continue, with my work being more directed to my writing and research – things that I have too long neglected and that I have promised my publishers I would do.

He lived his last years at Norris Health and Rehab Center. He died at a nursing home in Clinton, Tennessee on January 16, 2022, at the age of 91.

== Museum of Appalachia ==
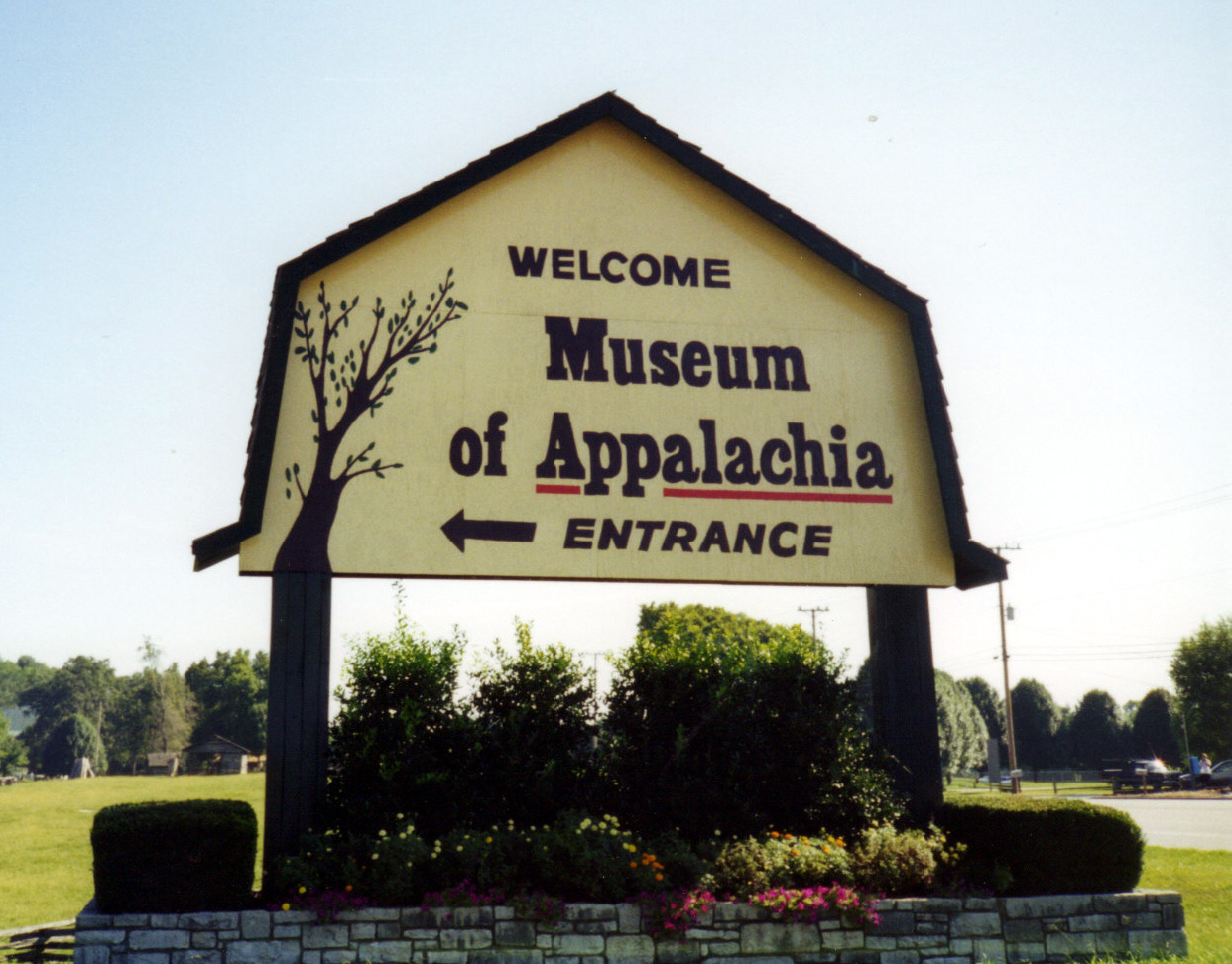
Sign at entrance of Museum of Appalachia

Irwin's interest in human history was provoked by his grandparents' stories. His grandfather once advised him, "You ought to keep these old-timey things that belonged to our people and start you a little museum sometime." Eventually in the 1960s he took that advice to heart. At a public auction in the early 1960s, he realized that the sales transactions were separating the artifacts of the past from the stories that his grandparents told. A person attending the sale told him that he was going to make a coffee table from the old spinning wheel he had just purchased. Irwin said of this conversation, "I just plain hated the idea of that object being hauled to Terre Haute or Dayton and made into a table completely removed from the context of the region, and from the people who made it and used it." Meanwhile, he spent $4 at the auction to buy an old horse shoeing box that had been found in the Clinch River in the aftermath of the deadly Big Barren Creek Flood of 1916. In later years, he said that he bought it not for its value as an antique, but for the history it embodied. His collection grew from that beginning, as he began to travel around the countryside to find and "save the past" in the form of artifacts.

In 1968, Irwin founded the Museum of Appalachia to house and display his growing collection. By 1980, the museum had grown so large that Irwin left his position as director of the Tennessee Appalachia Education Cooperative to devote all of his time to the museum.

Although the museum started as only a small log building, as of 2010, it has grown to a village-farm complex, comprehending more than 35 original mountain structures, two large display buildings containing thousands of Appalachian artifacts, farm animals, and several gardens. The museum was converted to a non-profit organization in 2003 and in May 2007, the museum announced its formal association with the Smithsonian Institution's Affiliations Program.

== Legacy and accolades ==
John Rice Irwin is generally known as the founder of the Museum of Appalachia. He was also the author of seven nationally and internationally distributed books. He lectured on the subject on Appalachian history throughout the eastern United States. In 1989, Irwin was one of 29 MacArthur Fellow grantees, which are provided to "extraordinary talented individuals." He was honored by the East Tennessee Historical Society in 1992 as one of nine East Tennesseans "whose accomplishments have distinguished them far beyond East Tennessee," and in 1993, he was awarded a Doctorate of Humane Letters from Cumberland College. In 1994, he was inducted into the Junior Achievement of East Tennessee's Business Hall of Fame. Six years later in 2000, he was the recipient of the annual Outstanding Educational Service to Appalachia Award. He was the 2008 recipient of the Trailblazer Award, and in 2009 was named to the Anderson County Hall of Fame.

== Works ==
Year	Title	Publisher	ID	Ref
1963	The story of Marcellus Moss Rice and his Big Valley kinsman	Times Print Company	ASIN B0007EYO1A	
1982	Baskets and Basketmakers of the Appalachias	Schiffer Publishing	ISBN 978-0-916838-61-4	
1983	A People and Their Quilts	Schiffer Publishing	ISBN 978-0-916838-87-4	
1983	Guns and Gunmakers of Southern Appalachia	Schiffer Publishing	ISBN 978-0-916838-81-2	
1983	Musical Instruments of the Southern Appalachian Mountains	Schiffer Publishing	ISBN 978-0-916838-80-5	
1985	Alex Stewart; Portrait of a Pioneer	Schiffer Publishing	ISBN 0-88740-053-1	
1987	The Museum of Appalachia story	Schiffer Publishing	ISBN 978-0-88740-102-2	
2000	A People and Their Music: The Story Behind the Story of Country Music	Schiffer Publishing	ISBN 978-0-7643-0942-7	
