= CenturyTel of Claiborne =

Telephone operating company

CenturyTel of Claiborne, Inc.
- Type: Private (Subsidiary of CenturyLink)
- Industry: Telecommunications
- Founded: 1960
- Products: Local Telephone Service
- Parent: Brightspeed
- Website: http://www.brightspeed.com/

CenturyTel of Claiborne, Inc. is a local telephone operating company of Brightspeed providing services to communities in Tennessee, including New Tazewell and Sharps Chapel. The company was founded in 1960.

The company was named Century Telephone of Claiborne, Inc. until 1998

The company is among those sold in 2022 to form Brightspeed. The purchase closed on October 3, 2022.
