= Roland A. Wank =

Hungarian modernist architect (1898–1970)

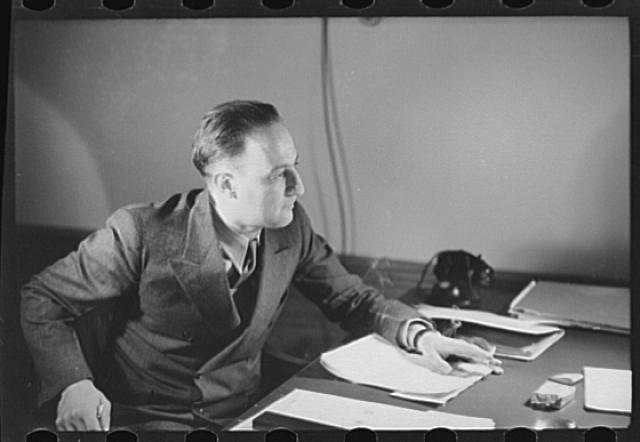
- Roland A. Wank
- Born: Roland A. Wank; 6 April 1898; Budapest, Austria-Hungary
- Died: 22 January 1970 (aged 71); United States
- Education: Royal Joseph Technical University, Budapest
- Occupation: Architect

Roland A. Wank (1898–1970) was a Hungarian-American modernist architect, best known for his work for the Tennessee Valley Authority in the United States.

Wank was educated at the Royal Joseph Technical University in Budapest. He worked as an architect in Austria until 1924 when he emigrated to the United States.

Wank was recruited by the Tennessee Valley Authority (TVA) in 1933 as that organization's first chief architect. His first work for them was to design Norris, a settlement for TVA workers. He went on to redesign the Norris Dam itself, taking the existing engineering proposal and simplifying its overall appearance, removing ornament, and pulling the structural masses into a more coherent and dramatic spatial composition. Wank also opened the powerhouse to public view, with a reception room staffed with information officers. Although the original engineers were not pleased, the TVA Board was, and Wank went on to give a distinctively modern look to subsequent TVA projects like the Fontana Dam, the Chickamauga Dam, and the Hiwassee Dam.

At the Fontana Dam, Wank collaborated with well-known industrial architect Albert Kahn on the design of "A-6" prefabricated house types in the workers' town of Fontana, North Carolina, meant to house 5000 workers. Fontana Village is now a resort. Wank also went on to collaborate with Fellheimer & Wagner as the design architects for the Cincinnati Union Terminal building, many corporate buildings in New York and New Jersey, structures for the New Jersey Turnpike and a branch department store (1951) in Montclair, New Jersey for Newark-based Hahne & Company.
