= Florence Reece =

American social activist, poet and folksong writer (1900-1986)

Florence Patton Reece
- Born: April 12, 1900; Sharps Chapel, Tennessee
- Died: August 3, 1986 (aged 86); Knoxville, Tennessee
- Occupations: poet, songwriter, labor and civil rights activist
- Spouse: Sam Reece
- Children: 10

Florence Reece (April 12, 1900 – August 3, 1986) was an American social activist, poet, and folksong writer. She is best known for the song "Which Side Are You On?" which she originally wrote at the age of twelve while her father was out on strike with other coal miners, according to The Penguin Book of American Folk Song by Alan Lomax.

In 1931, during the Harlan County strike by the United Mine Workers of America and the National Miners Union, in which her husband was an organizer, Reece updated her song to the version known today.

== Biography ==
Born in Sharps Chapel, Tennessee, the daughter and wife of coal miners, she is best known for the song "Which Side Are You On?". According to folklorist Alan Lomax who collected it from her in 1937, she wrote the song in 1912 when her father was out on strike, and then updated it in 1931 during the Harlan County War strike by the United Mine Workers of America and the National Miners Union in which her husband, Sam Reece, was an organizer.

Pete Seeger, collecting labor union songs, learned "Which Side Are You On" in 1940. The following year, it was recorded by the Almanac Singers in a version that gained a wide audience. More recently, Billy Bragg, Dropkick Murphys, Rebel Diaz, Natalie Merchant, Ani DiFranco, and Tom Morello each recorded their own interpretations of the song.

In 1931, the miners and the mine owners in southeastern Kentucky were locked in a bitter and violent struggle called the Harlan County War. In an attempt to intimidate the family of union leader Sam Reece, Sheriff J. H. Blair and his men, hired by the mining company, illegally entered their home in search of Reece. Reece had been warned in advance and escaped but his wife, Florence, and their children were terrorized. That night, after the men had gone, Florence wrote the lyrics to "Which Side Are You On?" on a calendar that hung in their kitchen. She took the melody from a traditional Baptist hymn, "Lay the Lily Low", or the traditional ballad "Jack Munro".

Reece appeared in the Academy Award-winning documentary film Harlan County, USA, singing her anthem to rally the striking miners. She was portrayed by Emily Bachynski in the second episode of the television show Damnation performing "Which Side Are You On?"

Florence and Sam Reece were married for 64 years until his death from pneumoconiosis (black lung) in 1978. After a lifetime of speaking on behalf of unions and social welfare issues, Florence Reece died of a heart attack in 1986 at the age of 86 in Knoxville, Tennessee.

== Discography ==
- Coal Mining Women (no date indicated), Rounder Records CD
