= Norris Dam State Park =

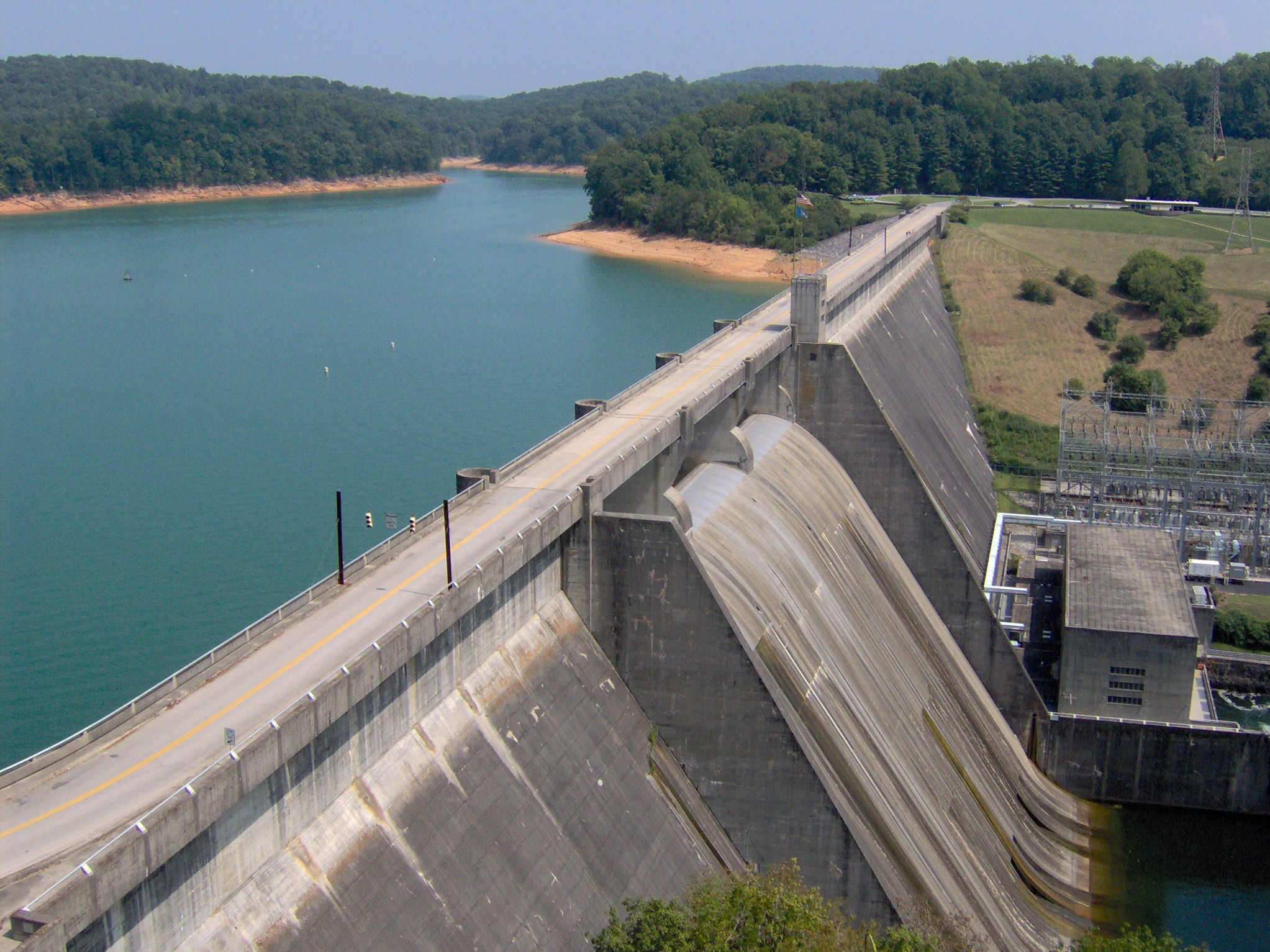
- Norris Dam
- Interactive map of Norris Dam State Park
- Type: state park
- Location: Anderson County and Campbell County, Tennessee
- Coordinates: 36.23960°N 84.10944°W
- Area: 4,038 acres (16.34 km^{2})
- Created: 1953
- Operator: Tennessee Department of Environment and Conservation
- Website: Norris Dam State Park

Norris Dam State Park is a state park in Anderson County and Campbell County, Tennessee, in the southeastern United States. The park is situated along the shores of Norris Lake, an impoundment of the Clinch River created by the completion of Norris Dam in 1936. The park consists of 4,038 acres (16.34 km^{2}) managed by the Tennessee Department of Environment and Conservation. The park also administers the Lenoir Museum Complex, which interprets the area's aboriginal, pioneer, and early 20th-century history.

Norris Dam was the pilot project of the Tennessee Valley Authority, a Great Depression-era entity created by the United States government in 1933 to control flooding and bring electricity and economic development to the Tennessee Valley. The construction and administration of the dam and reservoir would serve as a model for over two dozen other TVA dams built throughout the Tennessee Valley in subsequent decades. Along with Norris Dam State Park, there are several protected entities along Norris Lake's shores, including Big Ridge State Park, Chuck Swan State Forest, Cove Creek Wildlife Management Area, and River Bluff Small Wild Area. Norris Dam State Park was named for Nebraska senator George William Norris (1861–1944), who lobbied intensively for the creation of the Tennessee Valley Authority in the early 1930s.

== Geographical setting ==
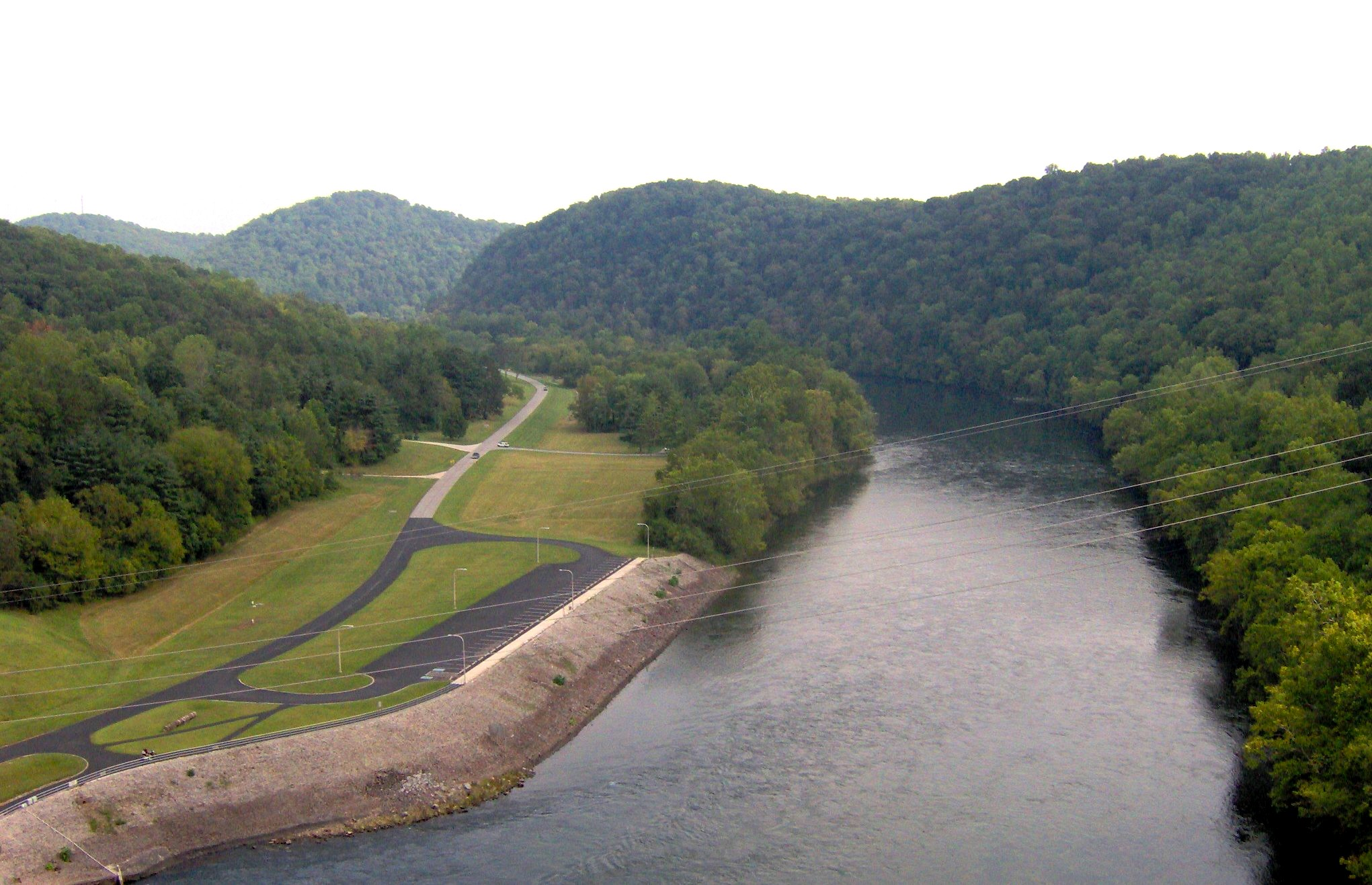
The Clinch River, downstream from Norris Dam

The Clinch River flows southwestward for 300 miles (480 km) from its source in southwestern Virginia to its mouth along the Tennessee River near Kingston. Norris Dam is located just over 79 miles (127 km) upstream from the mouth of the Clinch, near the Anderson-Campbell county line. Cove Creek, which flows down from its source in the Cumberland Mountains roughly 25 miles (40 km) to the northwest, empties into the Clinch approximately 1 mile (1.6 km) north of Norris Dam. The Powell River, which also rises in southwestern Virginia, empties into the Clinch approximately 10 miles (16 km) upstream from Norris Dam. Norris Lake spans a 73-mile (117 km) stretch of the Clinch from the dam to the base of River Ridge at the Claiborne-Grainger county line. The lake also spans the lower 56 miles (90 km) of the Powell River from the river's mouth to a few miles south of Harrogate, and the lower 12 miles (19 km) of Cove Creek.

The Norris Dam Reservation, which is managed by the Tennessee Valley Authority, consists of the area immediately around Norris Dam and immediately downstream from the dam on both sides of the Clinch. The western half of the reservation, which is largely undeveloped, is known as the River Bluff Small Wild Area. Norris Dam State Park consists of two sections along the south shore of the lake immediately east and west of the Norris Dam Reservation. The west section spans the lower 4 miles (6.4 km) of Cove Creek and includes the Andrews Ridge and West Campground section and the park offices and recreation areas. The east section spans a 5-mile (8.0 km) section of the Clinch between the dam and the Sequoyah Marina. The Lenoir Museum Cultural Complex— which is also part of Norris Dam State Park— consists of a small patch of land downstream from the dam on the east side of the river. Other protected areas in the vicinity include the Cove Creek Wildlife Management Area, which spans most of the lake's north shore opposite the state park, and the vast 24,000-acre (97 km^{2}) Chuck Swan State Forest, which covers parts of the Clinch River upstream from the park and the lower portions of the Powell River.

The Norris Freeway section of U.S. Route 441, which crosses the dam and provides access to both sections of the park and the Lenoir Museum, connects the Norris area to Rocky Top to the west and Knoxville to the south. Interstate 75 passes roughly 5 miles (8.0 km) west of the park. The city of Norris, which was developed along with the dam as part of the Norris Project in the 1930s, is located a few miles south of the dam.

== Natural information ==
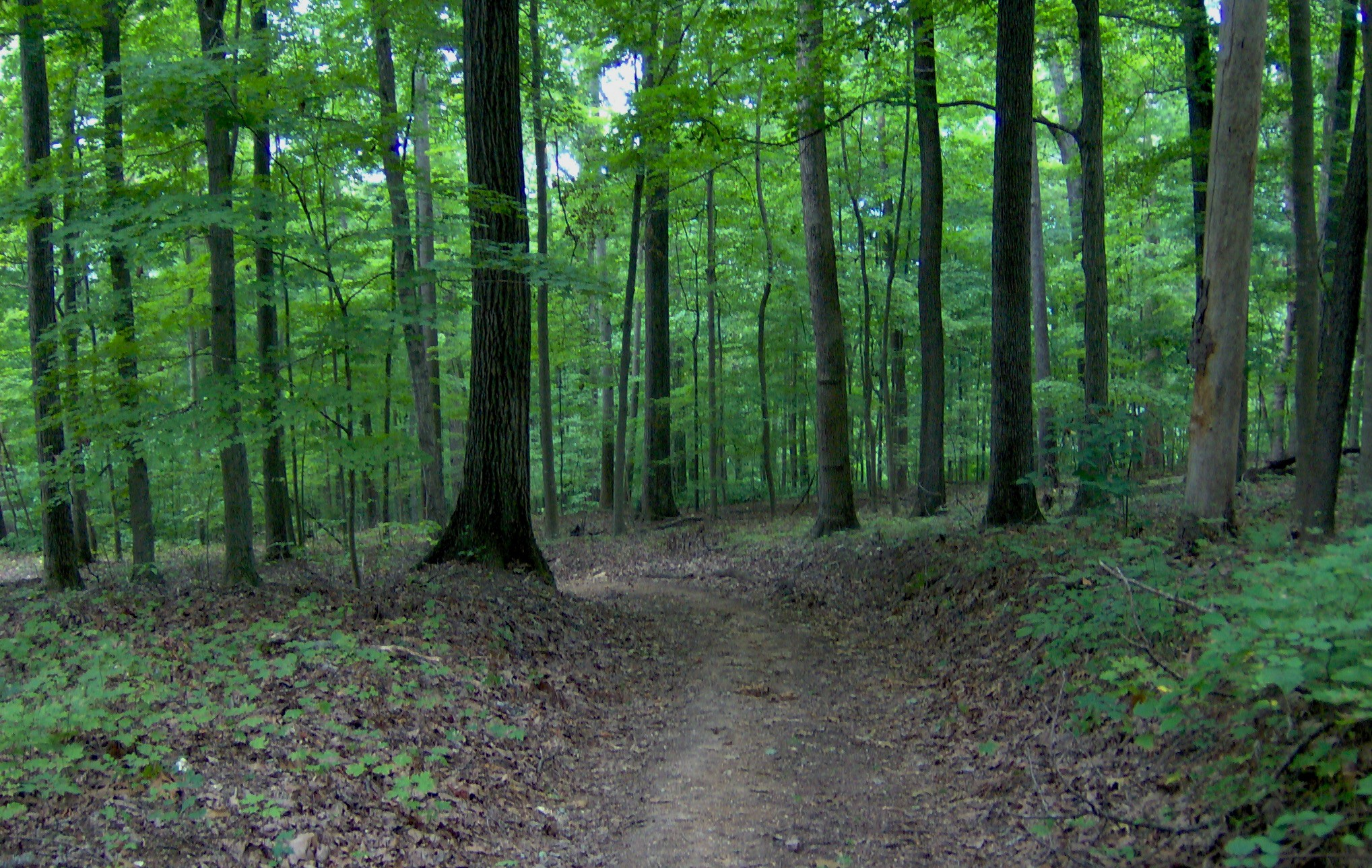
Oak forest on the slopes of High Point

Norris Dam State Park is located entirely within the Appalachian Ridge-and-Valley Range, which is characterized by narrow elongated ridges flanked by broad, fertile river valleys. The low rolling hills that dominate the park's terrain are underlain by sedimentary rocks— namely limestone, dolomite, shale, and sandstone— which were formed roughly 400–500 million years ago during the Paleozoic Era.

Most of Norris Dam State Park is coated by an Appalachian oak–pine forest, much of which is second-growth, although significant old growth stands remain in nearby Chuck Swan State Forest. Oak stands comprise the majority of the forest, and consist chiefly of blackjack oak, chestnut oak, post oak, scarlet oak, and red oak in drier areas and white oak and black oak in more moist areas. The most common evergreens are the shortleaf pine and the loblolly pine. Less common tree species include red maple, yellow poplar, several species of hickory, and black gum and sweet gum. Beech, dogwood, and sourwood are found in the understory.

== History ==
The Norris Basin has been inhabited on at least a semi-permanent basis since the Archaic period (c. 8000–1000 BC). In anticipation of the creation of the Norris Reservoir in the mid-1930s, William Webb of the Smithsonian Institution conducted an extensive archaeological survey of the lower Clinch Valley. Webb located 23 prehistoric sites (which included 12 burial mounds and 34 townhouses) along the Clinch and its immediate watershed between what is now Oak Ridge and Claiborne County. At Saltpeter Cave, located approximately 5 miles (8.0 km) above the mouth of the Powell River, Webb uncovered 13 Native American burials as well as numerous tools and pottery fragments dating to various prehistoric periods. Webb may have been the first to differentiate between the Hiwassee Island culture (c. 1000–1300 AD) and the Dallas culture (c. 1300–1600 AD) that once dominated the Tennessee Valley (Webb noticed that one culture used "large-log" structures while the other used "small-log" structures). Webb also speculated, based on his findings in the Norris Basin, that the Cherokee were relative newcomers in the Tennessee Valley, arriving in the area no later than the late 17th century.

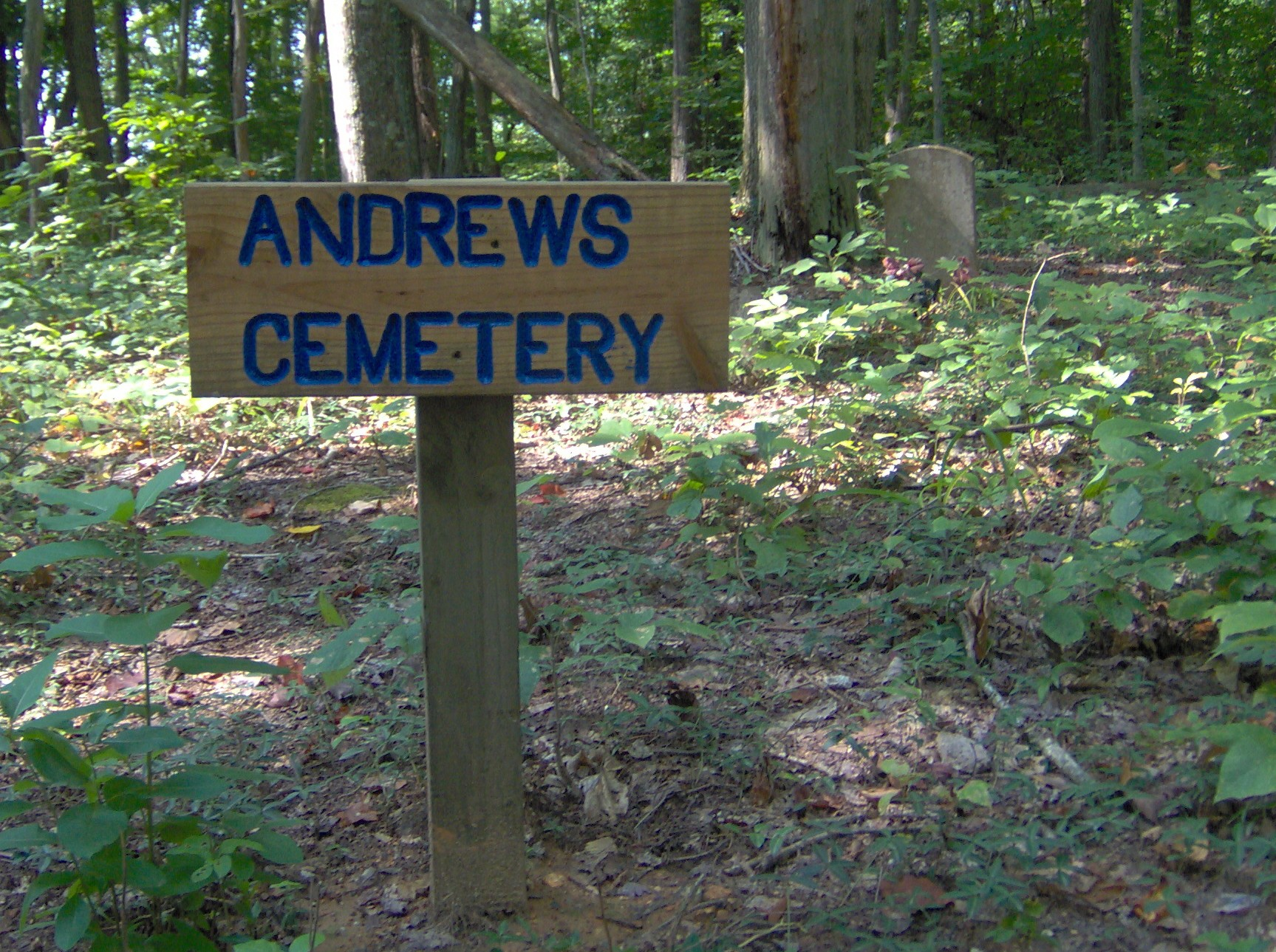
Andrews Cemetery atop Andrews Ridge, in the west section of the park

Although when the Cherokee actually arrived in the Tennessee Valley is still debated, the tribe was in control of the region when the first English explorers and traders crossed the Appalachian Mountains into the East Tennessee area in the mid-18th century. The Clinch River Valley was explored in the 1760s by various long hunter expeditions, the most well-known of which was led by Elisha Walden in 1761. The first permanent Euro-American settlers arrived in the Anderson County and Campbell County areas in the 1790s.

For most of the 19th and early 20th centuries, the Norris area remained sparsely populated, although several coal company towns formed in the late 19th century at the base of Cross Mountain just a few miles to the west. Of the 2,841 families removed by the Tennessee Valley Authority for the reservoir's construction in the 1930s, nearly all lived on subsistence farms with an average size of 62.6 acres (253,000 m^{2}). Several of these early inhabitants are buried in cemeteries within the state park's boundaries, namely at Andrews Cemetery atop Andrews Ridge and Harmon Cemetery near the park's headquarters.

In the 1920s, several private and public entities began lobbying the federal government for the construction of a dam at the confluence of Cove Creek and the Clinch River to control flooding in the Tennessee Valley (it had been determined that the large volume of water carried by the Clinch to the Tennessee River was partially responsible for rampant flooding in cities such as Dayton and Chattanooga which were downstream from this confluence). When the Tennessee Valley Authority was formed in 1933, it assumed direction of the Cove Creek Project. The project was renamed the "Norris Project" after Nebraska Senator George Norris, who had been a key advocate for the creation of the Tennessee Valley Authority in the U.S. Senate in the early 1930s. Norris Dam and its accompanying reservoir would allow control over the depths of the Tennessee River, aiding in both flood prevention and river navigation by keeping the river's depths consistent. The dam would also generate hydroelectric power, providing cheap electricity and allowing the area to modernize to a considerable extent. The city of Norris, located a few miles south of the dam, was developed as a planned city alongside the dam project. The construction of Norris Dam began on October 1, 1933, and its gates were closed on March 4, 1936.

=== Historic district ===
- Norris Dam State Park Rustic Cabins Historic District
- U.S. National Register of Historic Places
- U.S. Historic district
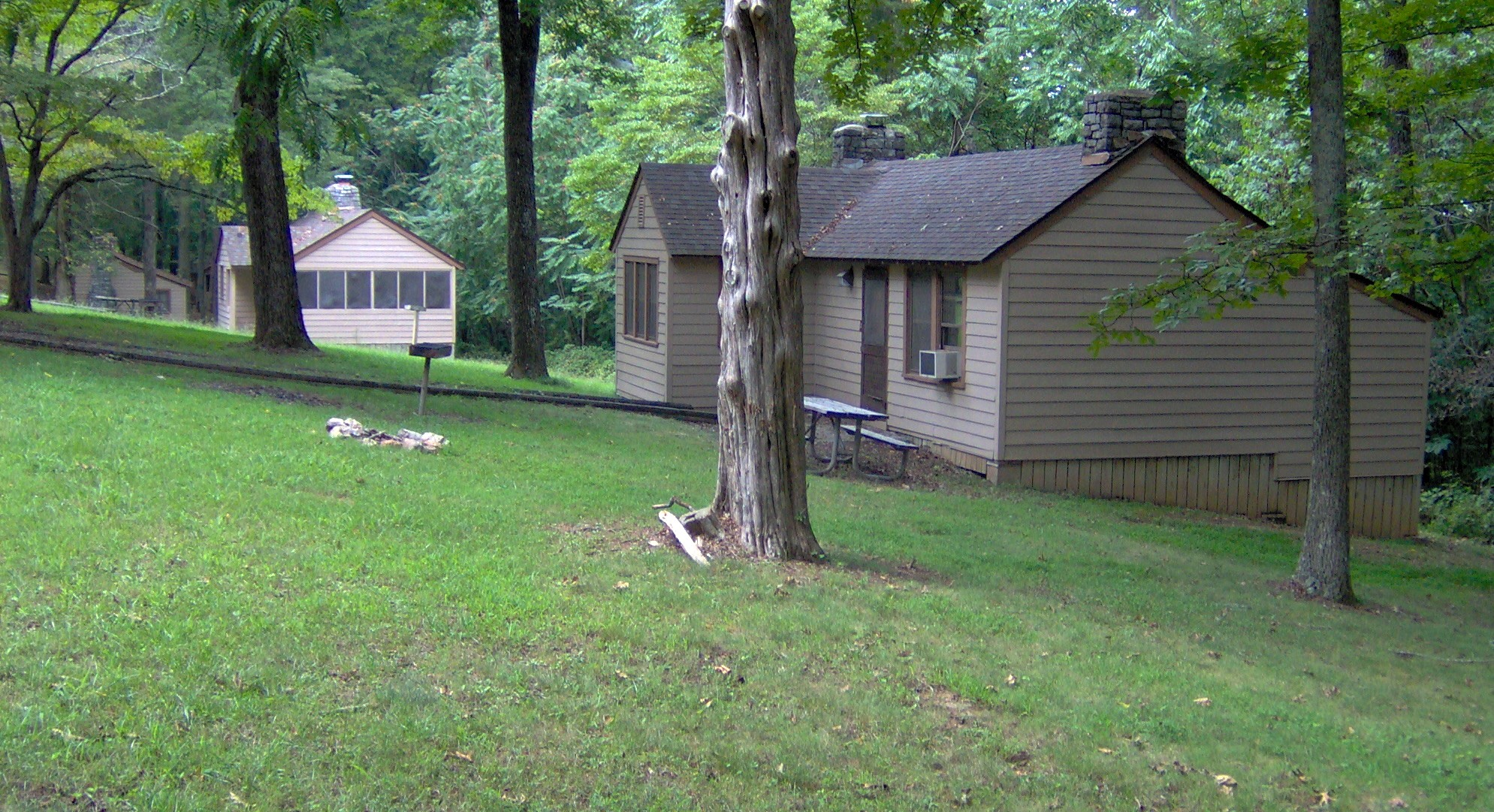

- Location within Tennessee Location within the United States
- Location: Norris Dam State Park, Norris, Tennessee
- Area: 37 acres (15 ha)
- Built: 1934–1953
- NRHP reference No.: 14000446
- Added to NRHP: July 25, 2014

The east section of Norris Dam State Park was developed in the 1930s by the Civilian Conservation Corps as a "demonstration recreational project" of the Tennessee Valley Authority. The CCC built a lodge, several rustic cabins, and an amphitheater. The land was sold to the State of Tennessee in 1953. The state developed the more modern west section of the park in the 1970s, and obtained control of the marina in 1986. The CCC-built area was listed on the National Register of Historic Places in 2014.

== Layout ==
The older east section of Norris Dam State Park has 19 rustic cabins, a 40-site campground, and a convention house known as the "Tea Room". The newer west section has 10 deluxe cabins, a 50-site campground, and a recreation center. The park offices are located in the west section. The marina is located just west of the dam.

Both the east and west sections of the park have several miles of short hiking trails which meander through the forest on the ridge slopes and along the lakeshore. Several longer trails extend into the state forest to the east of the park. Hiking trails also traverse the TVA-controlled River Bluff Small Wild Area just west of the dam.

=== Lenoir Museum Cultural Complex ===
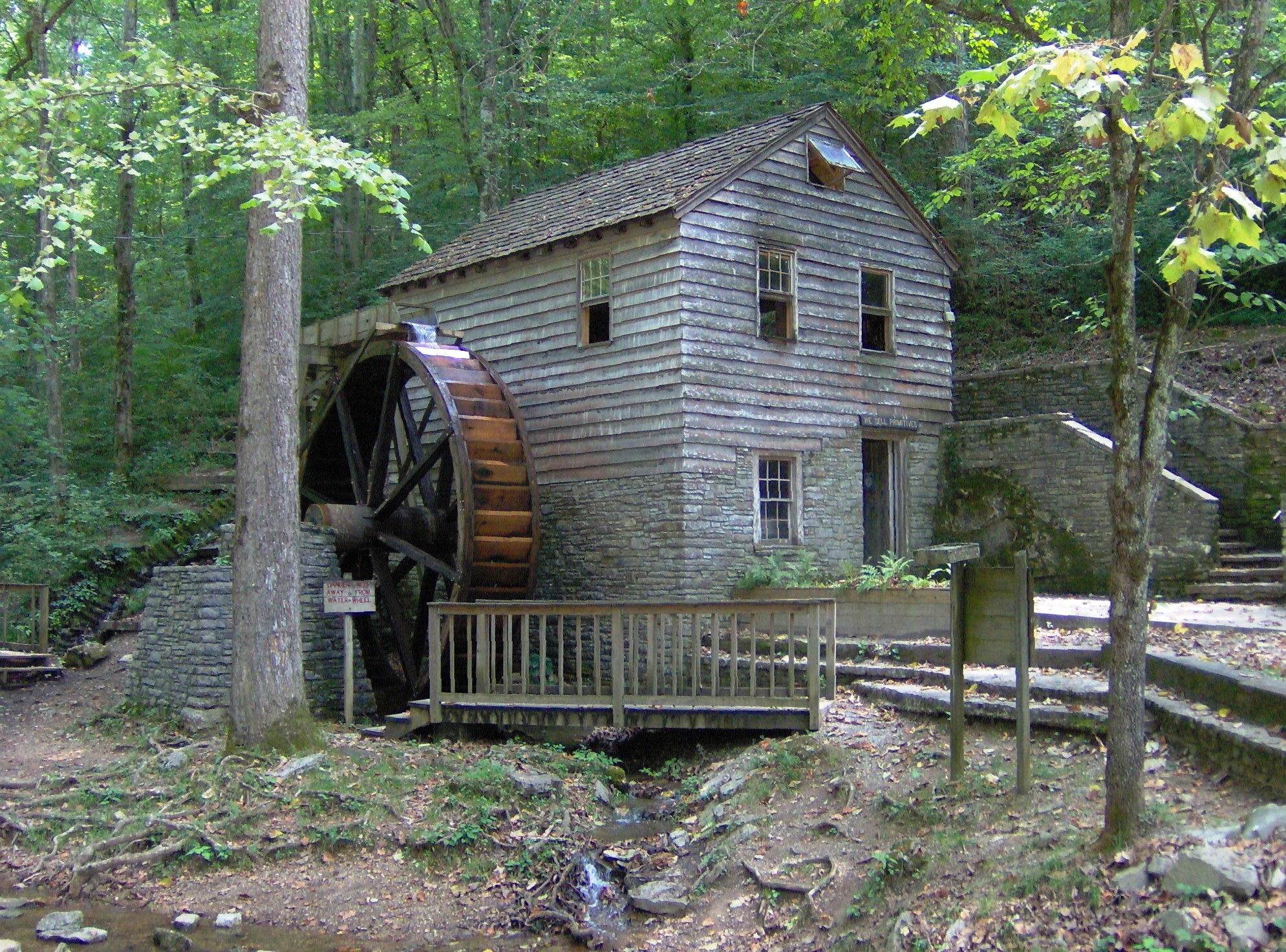
Rice Gristmill

The Lenoir Museum Cultural Complex includes the Lenoir Museum and two historical structures— the Rice Gristmill and the Crosby Threshing Barn. The Lenoir Museum mainly houses the collection of its namesakes, antique collectors Will and Helen Lenoir. After Helen died in 1960, Will donated their vast collection to the state for display. The museum includes an 1826 barrel organ, several 19th-century room displays, an early-20th century general store counter, and various tools from the early pioneer era in East Tennessee.

The Rice Gristmill was built by James Rice (d. 1829) in 1798. The mill originally stood on Lost Creek in what is now Union County several miles to the east (the creek is now part of an embayment along Norris Lake). The mill, which is powered by an overshot wheel-driven turbine, was refurbished and remodeled for various tasks throughout the 19th century. When the Tennessee Valley Authority purchased the Rice property along Lost Creek in 1935, the mill was in the possession of James Rice's great-grandson, Rufus Rice. The CCC and the National Park Service carefully dismantled the mill and reassembled it at its present location.

The Crosby Threshing Barn was built in the 1830s by Caleb Crosby. It was originally situated along the Holston River near Morristown on a farm now submerged under Cherokee Lake. Before their farm was flooded in the 1940s, Bryant and Powell Crosby, grandsons of Caleb, donated the barn to the National Park Service. The barn was dismantled and kept in storage until 1978, when the Park Service donated it to the State of Tennessee. Along with the oxen-driven threshing machine and a mini-museum of 19th and early 20th-century farm tools, the barn houses a section of the massive Tregonia Elm, which was once believed to be the largest elm tree in the United States.

== Photo gallery ==
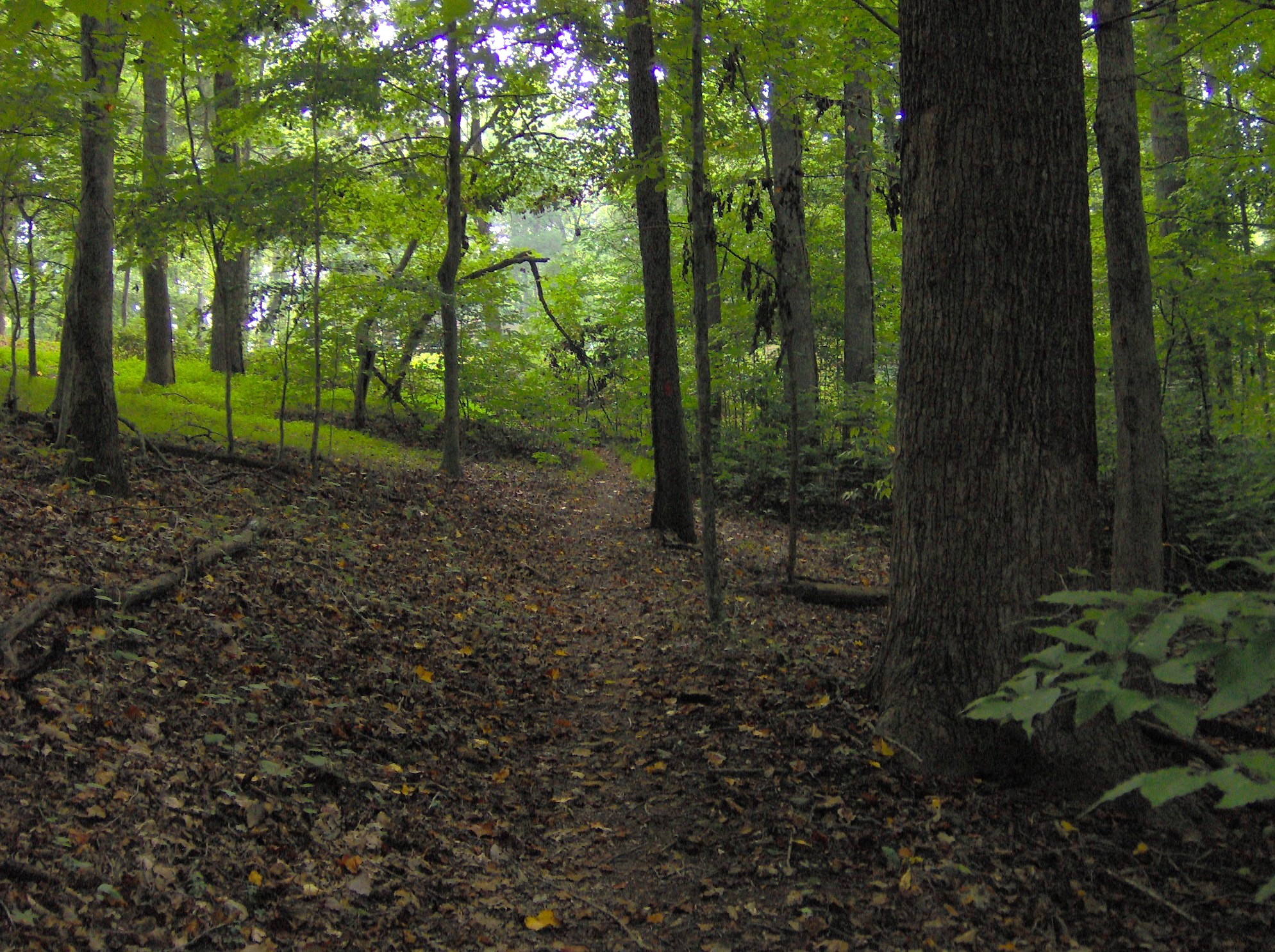
The Tall Timbers Trail in the park's east section

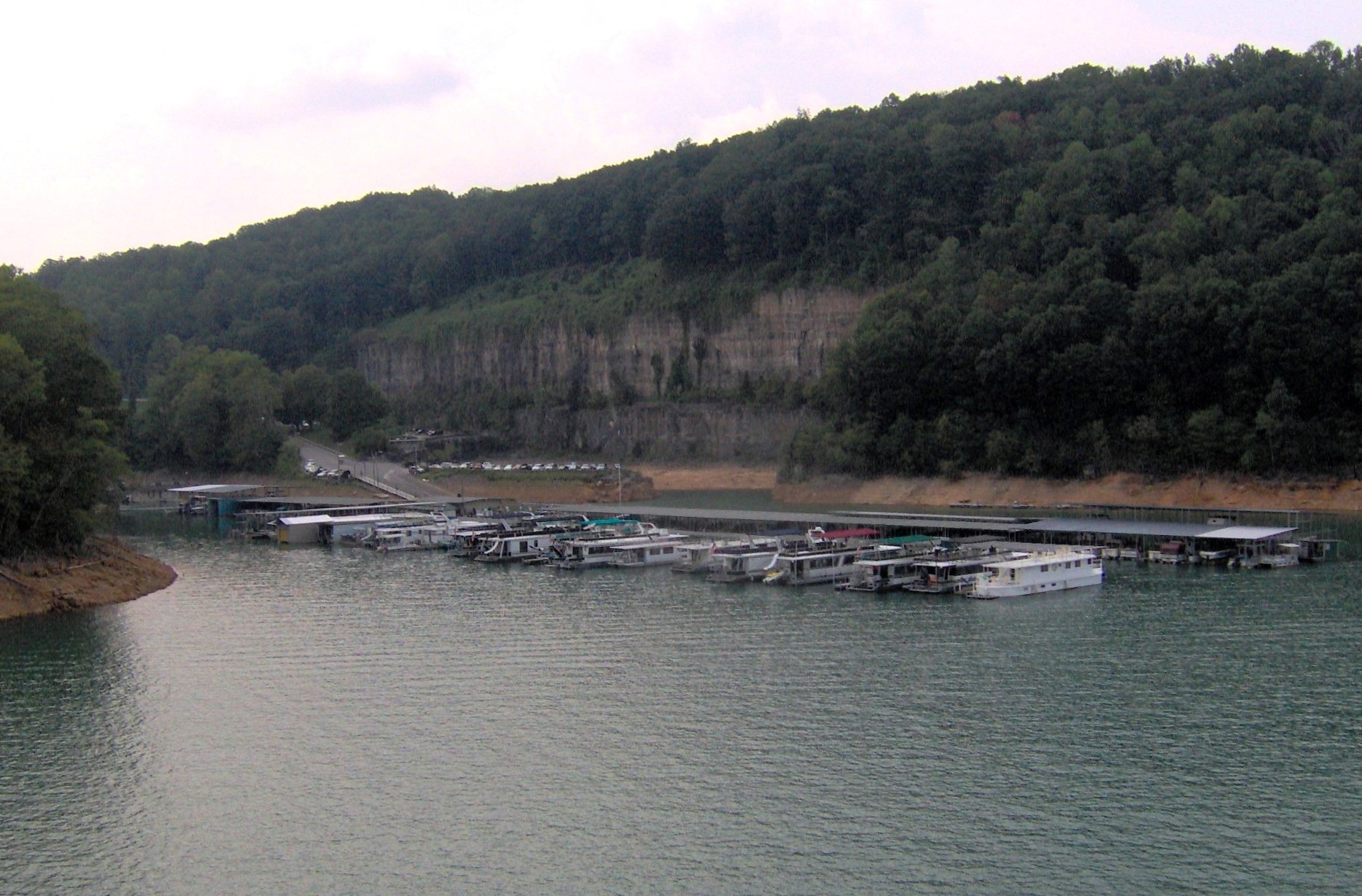
The Norris Marina

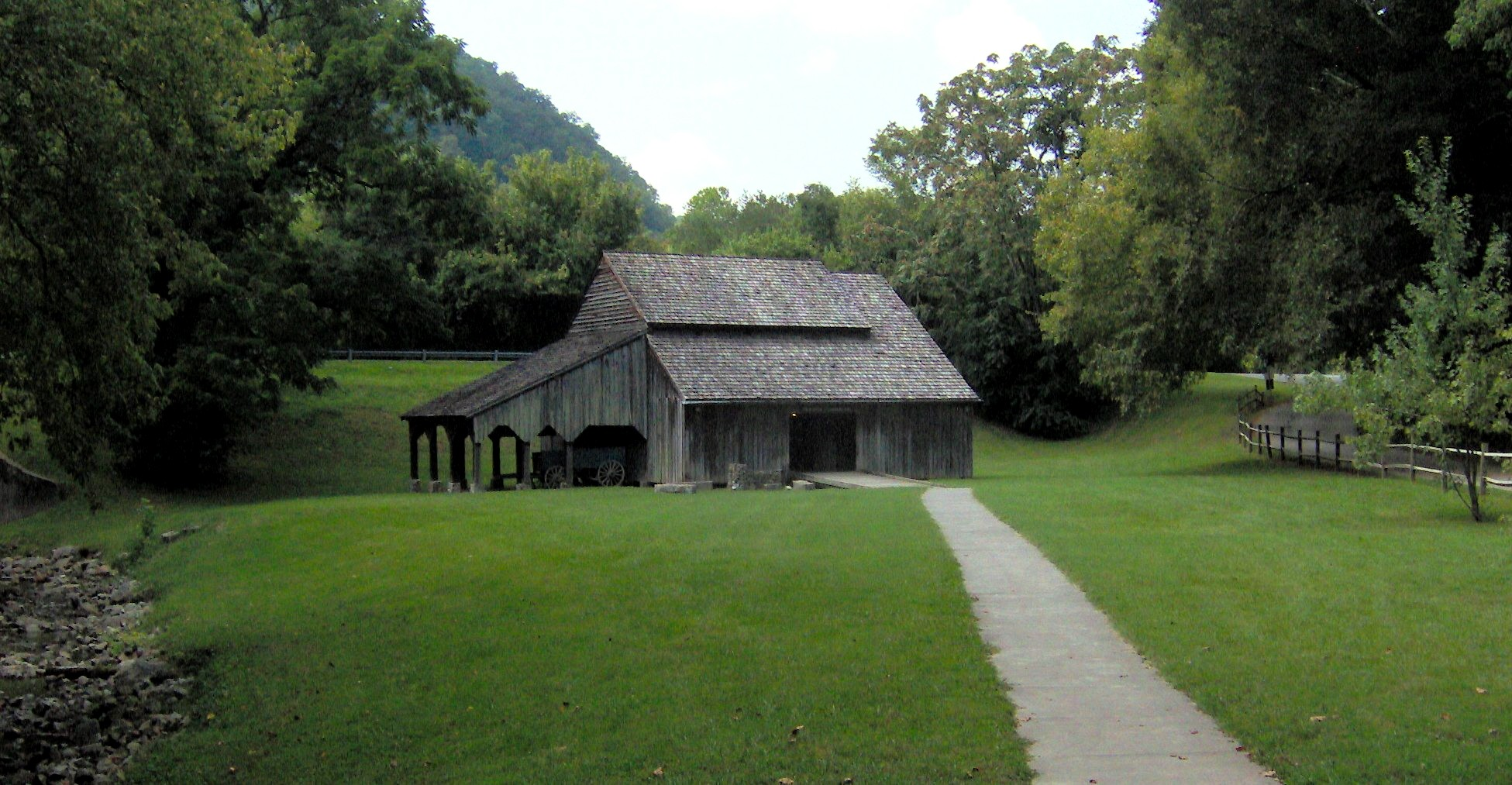
Caleb Crosby Threshing Barn at the Lenoir Complex

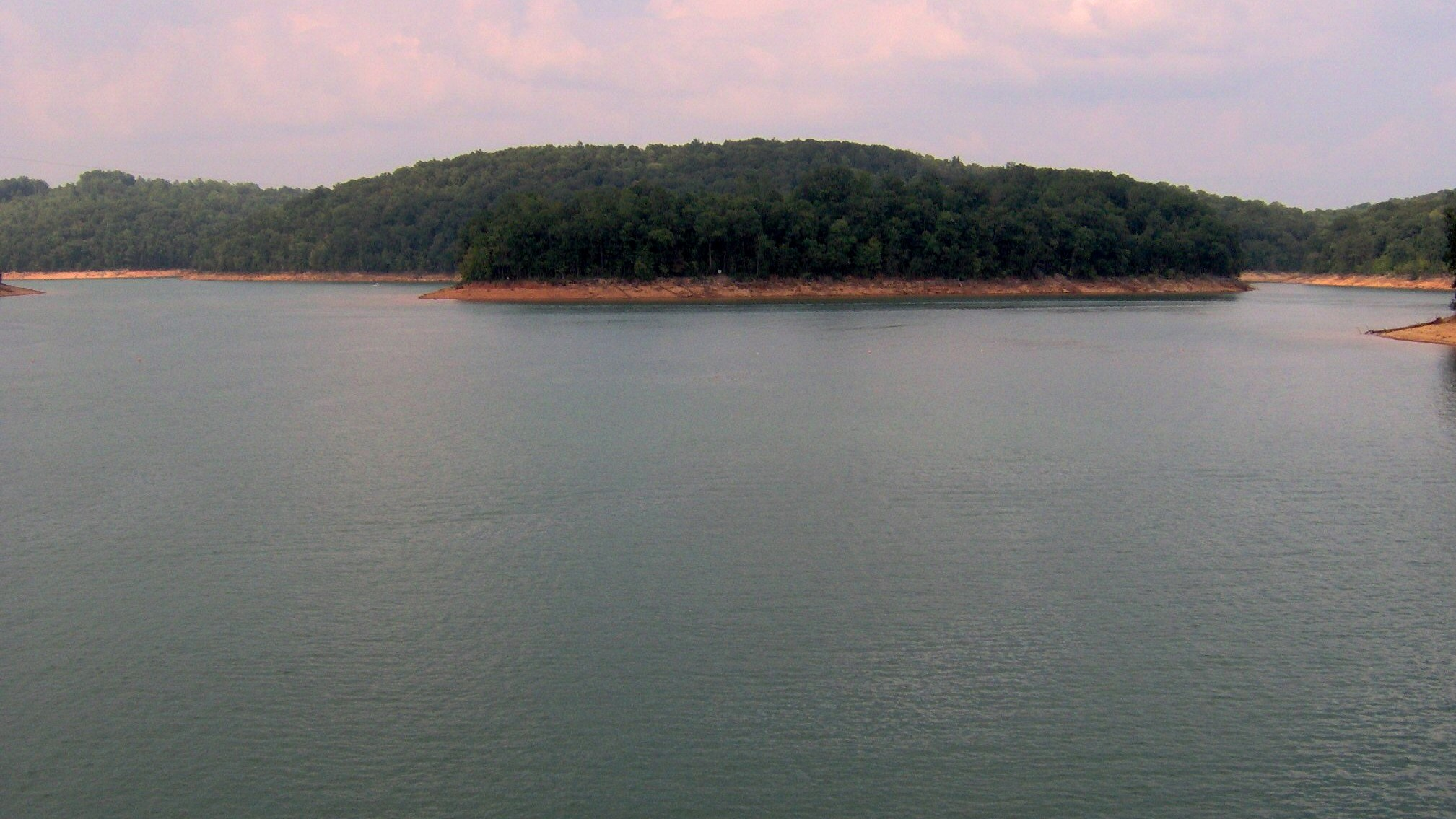
Norris Lake viewed from the dam

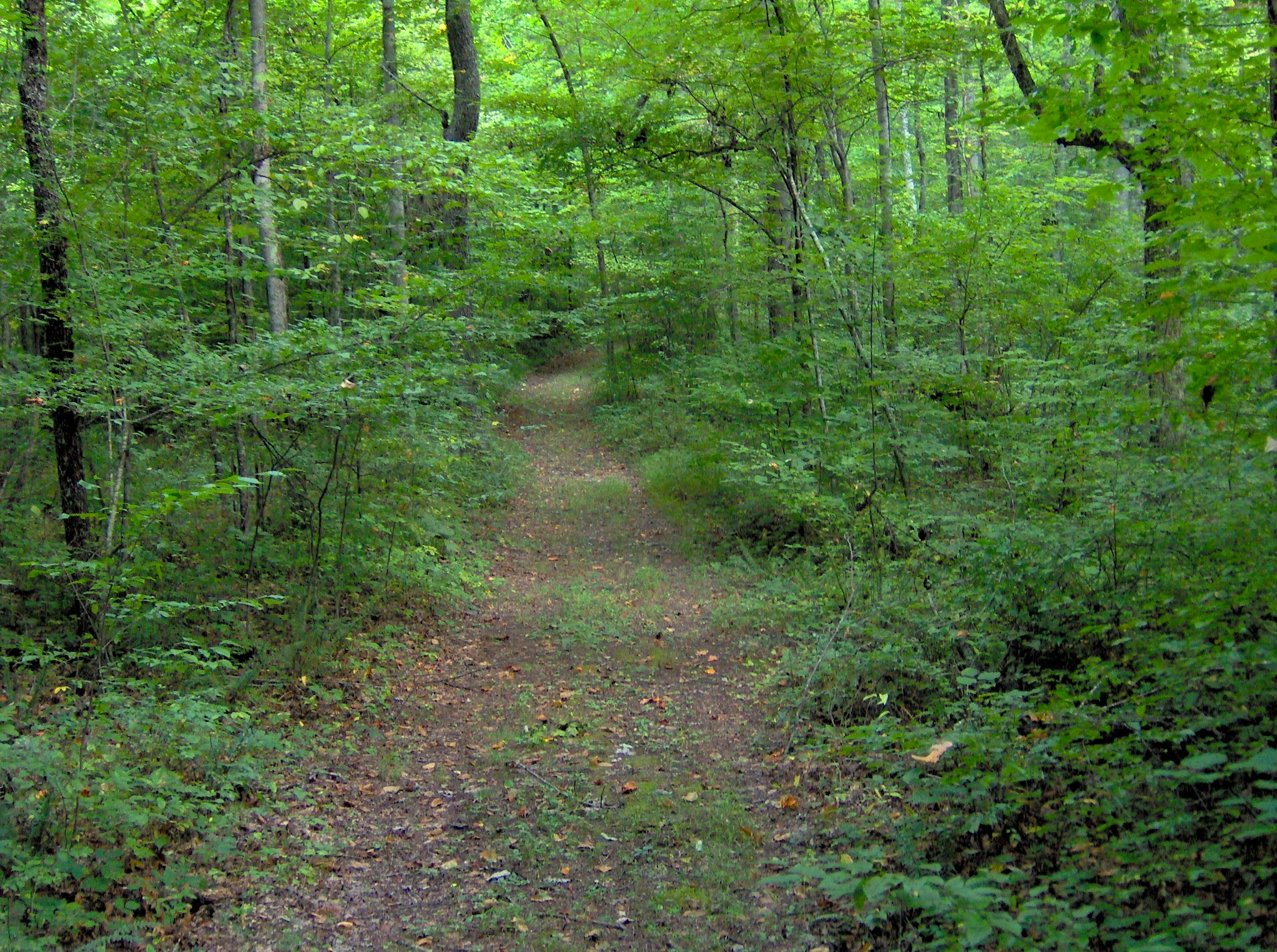
The Sinkhole Trail in the park's west section

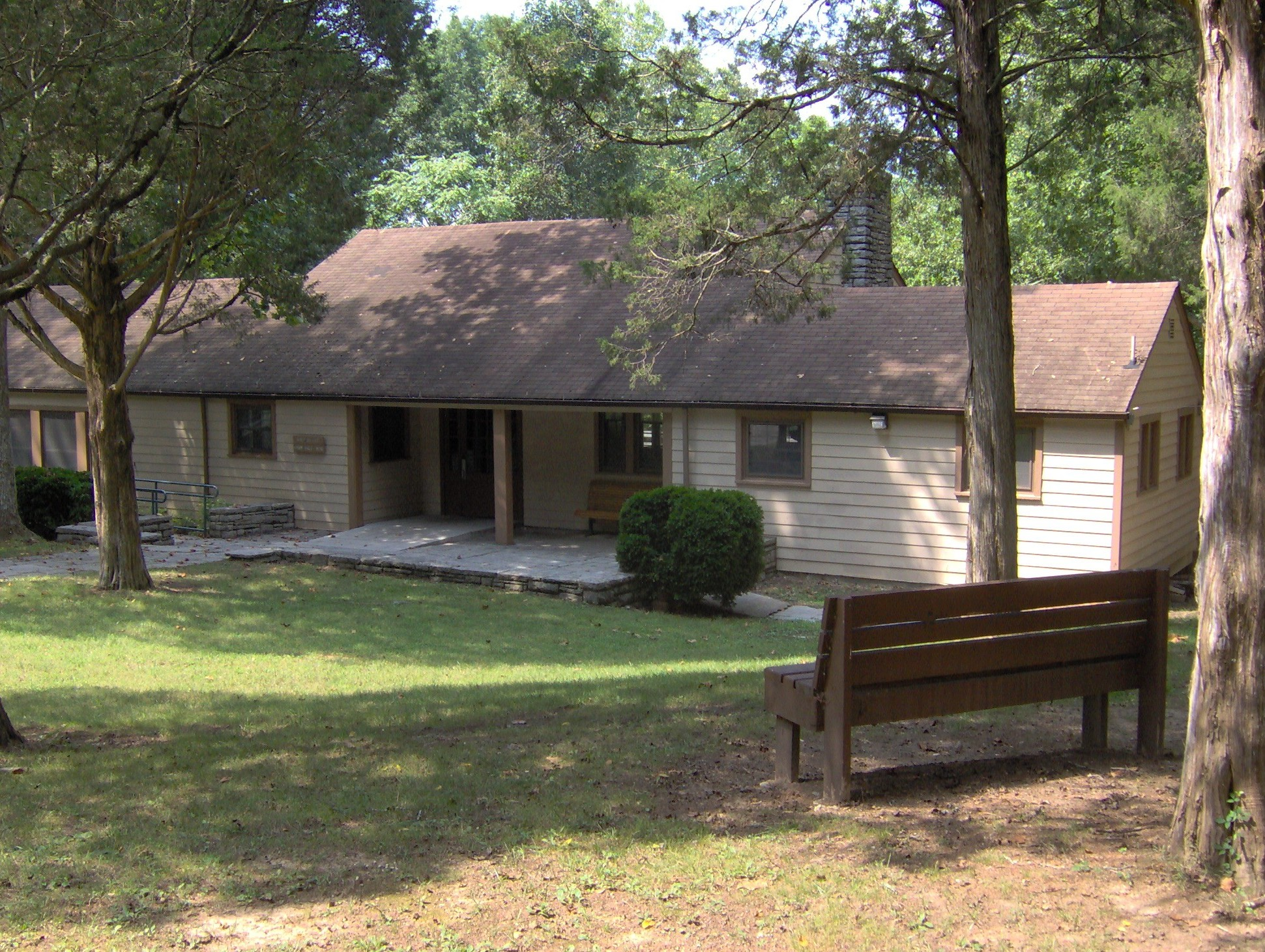
The Tea Room

== See also ==
- National Register of Historic Places listings in Anderson County, Tennessee
