= Norris Dam =

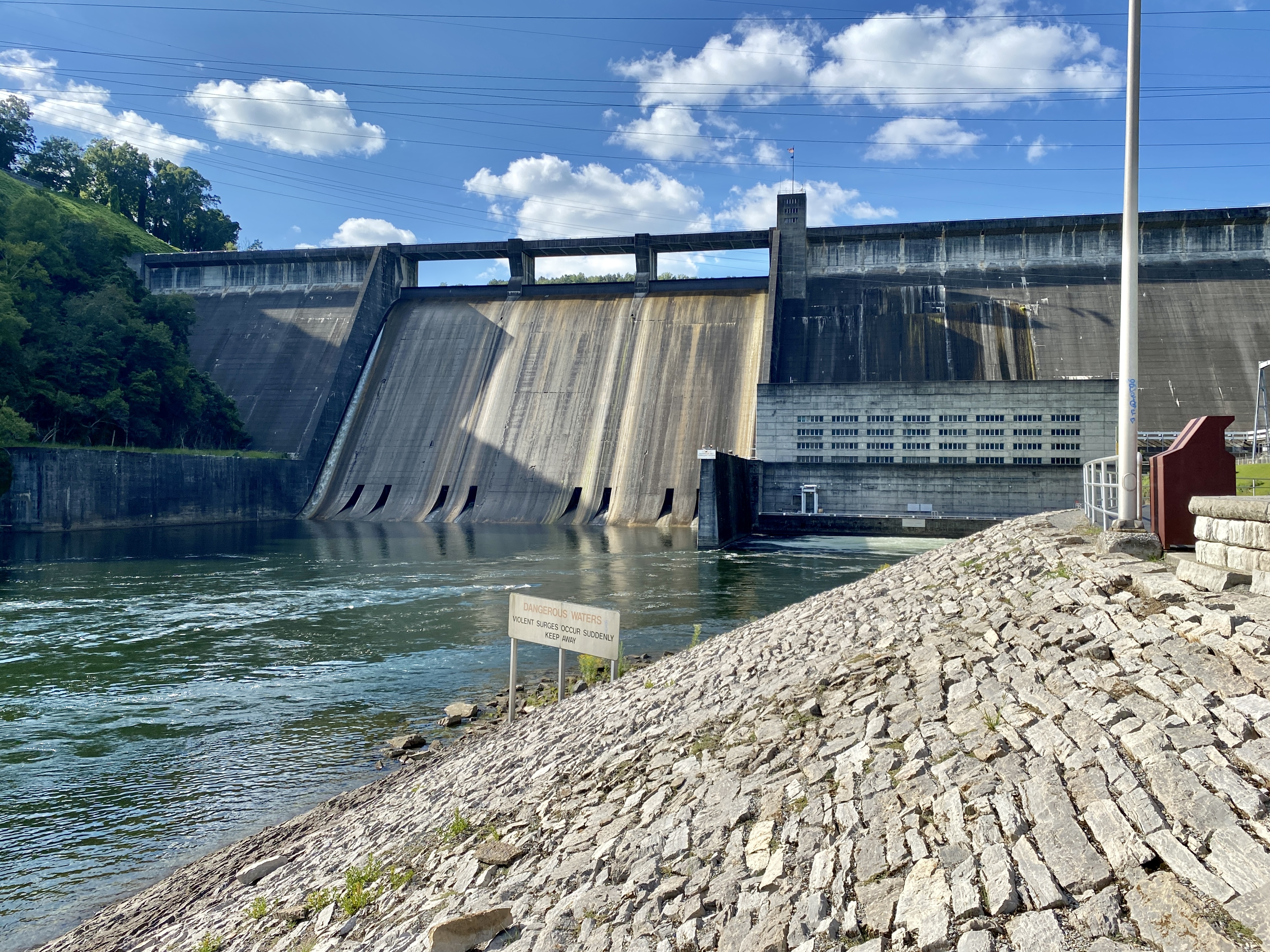
- Norris Dam and Powerhouse, circa 2021.

- Location within Tennessee
- Official name: Norris Dam
- Location: Anderson County and Campbell County, Tennessee, U.S.
- Coordinates: 36°13′27″N 84°05′29″W
- Purpose: Flood control, electricity
- Construction began: October 1, 1933
- Opening date: March 4, 1936
- Construction cost: US$32.3 million (equivalent to $741,574,436 in 2025)
- Designed by: Roland A. Wank
- Operator: Tennessee Valley Authority

Dam and spillways
- Impounds: Clinch River
- Height: 265 feet (81 m)
- Length: 1,860 feet (570 m)

Reservoir
- Creates: Norris Lake
- Total capacity: 2,552,000 acre⋅ft (3,148,000 dam^{3})
- Catchment area: 2,912 mi^{2} (7,540 km^{2})

Power Station
- Commission date: 1936
- Turbines: 2 x 66 MW Francis-type
- Installed capacity: 132 MW

Norris Dam is a hydroelectric and flood control structure located on the Clinch River in Anderson County and Campbell County, Tennessee, United States. The dam was the first major project for the Tennessee Valley Authority, which had been created in 1933 to bring economic development to the region and control the rampant flooding that had long plagued the Tennessee Valley. The dam was named in honor of Nebraska Senator George Norris (1861–1944), a longtime supporter of government-owned utilities in general, and of TVA in particular. The infrastructure project was listed on the National Register of Historic Places in 2016.

Norris Dam is a straight concrete gravity-type dam. The dam is 1860 feet (570 m) long and 265 feet (81 m) high. Norris Lake, the largest reservoir on a tributary of the Tennessee River, has 33,840 acres (137 km^{2}) of water surface and 809 miles (1302 km) of shoreline. The dam has a maximum generating capacity of 126 megawatts.

== Location ==
The Clinch River flows southwestward for 300 miles (480 km) from its headwaters in Virginia through the rugged, sparsely populated hills of northeastern Tennessee before emptying into the Tennessee River near Kingston. Norris Dam is located just over 79 miles (127 km) upstream from the mouth of the Clinch, immediately downstream from the river's confluence with Cove Creek, which joins the river from the northwest. The reservoir includes parts of Anderson, Campbell, Union, Claiborne, and Grainger counties. Norris Reservoir spans a 73-mile (117 km) stretch of the Clinch from the dam to River Ridge at the Claiborne-Grainger county line. The reservoir also covers the lower 56 miles (90 km) of the Powell River, which empties into the Clinch 10 miles (16 km) upstream from Norris Dam. The dam's tailwaters are part of Melton Hill Lake, which stretches for 56 miles (90 km) along the Clinch from Norris to Melton Hill Dam.

Norris Freeway, a section of U.S. Highway 441 widened in the 1930s to aid in dam construction, crosses the top of Norris Dam and connects the area to Interstate 75 at Rocky Top, Tennessee to the west and Knoxville, Tennessee to the south. Along with the reservation maintained by TVA for the operation of Norris Dam, most of the lower Norris Reservoir is surrounded by conservation lands, including Norris Dam State Park adjacent to the reservation, the Cove Creek Wildlife Management Area across the lake to the north, and the Chuck Swan State Forest, which protects a largely undeveloped area a few miles upstream.

== Background and construction ==
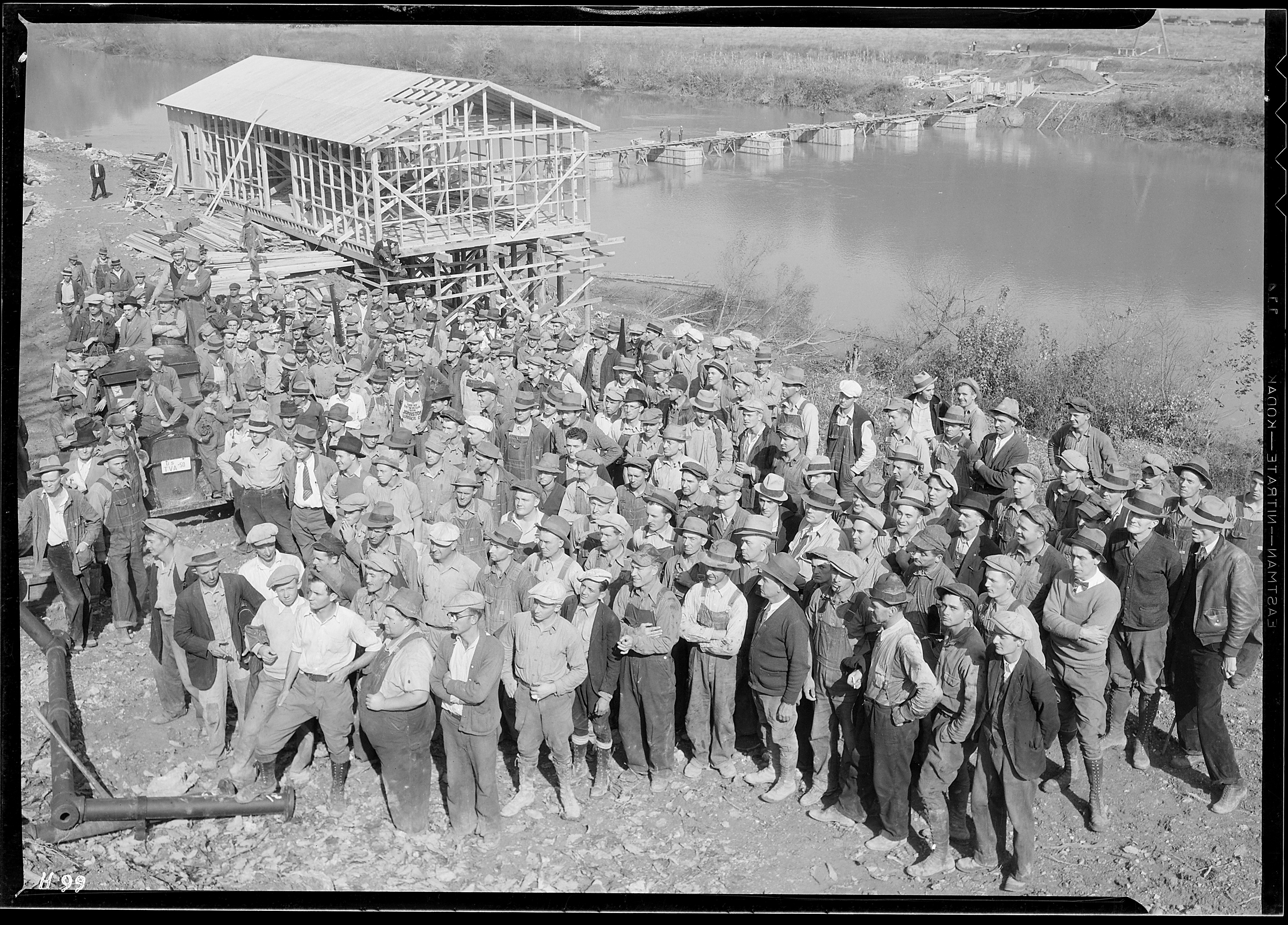
Workers at Norris Dam, Tennessee Valley Authority, 3 November 1933

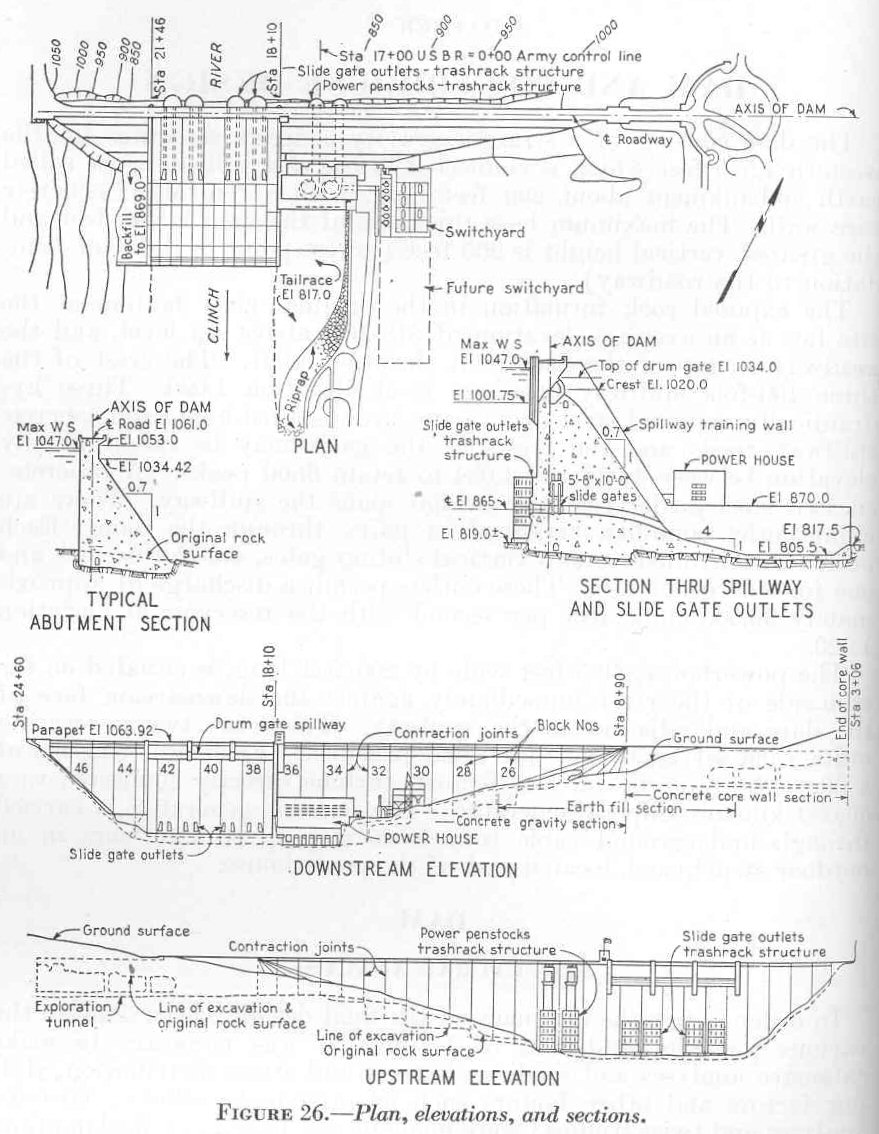
Design plan for Norris Dam, c. 1933

As early as 1911, the present site of Norris Dam—initially called the "Cove Creek site"—was identified as a prime location for a sizeable dam. Several government and private entities believed that a dam in the upper Tennessee Valley, working in conjunction with dams at Muscle Shoals, Alabama, could provide badly needed flood control to East Tennessee and help keep the Tennessee River consistently navigable year-round. In the early 1920s, several entities—including the Tennessee Electric Power Company (TEPCo), the Knoxville Power & Light Company, and Union Carbide— applied for permits to build a dam at the Cove Creek site, although all were eventually withdrawn or rejected. Part of the opposition was from Senator Norris, who advocated a government-sponsored dam at the site, arguing that a private entity would be almost wholly concerned with power generation rather than flood control and coordination with projects elsewhere in the valley. Norris proposed constructing a network of dams throughout the valley to help regulate its outflow into the lower Mississippi River. Throughout the late 1920s, the U.S. Army Corps of Engineers made several proposals to build a dam at the site, but all were rejected by Congress or vetoed by President Calvin Coolidge.

The Tennessee Valley Authority was formed in 1933 as part of President Franklin D. Roosevelt's New Deal legislation. The act authorizing TVA's establishment (signed on May 18, 1933) authorized TVA to immediately begin construction on a dam at the Cove Creek site. On July 30, TVA renamed the Cove Creek project for Senator Norris and began preparations for the dam's construction. As the agency lacked any engineering or dam construction experience, it relied heavily on the Army Corps' original design, and received ample consulting from the U.S. Bureau of Reclamation. Hungarian-American architect Roland Wank (1898–1970) revised the initial plans from Bureau of Reclamation engineers, and gave the poured-concrete Norris Dam a modernist style, which was controversial and advanced for the era of construction, but the result would eventually succeed in elevating Roland Wank to the position of Chief Architect for TVA from 1933 through 1944. Construction began on October 1, 1933.

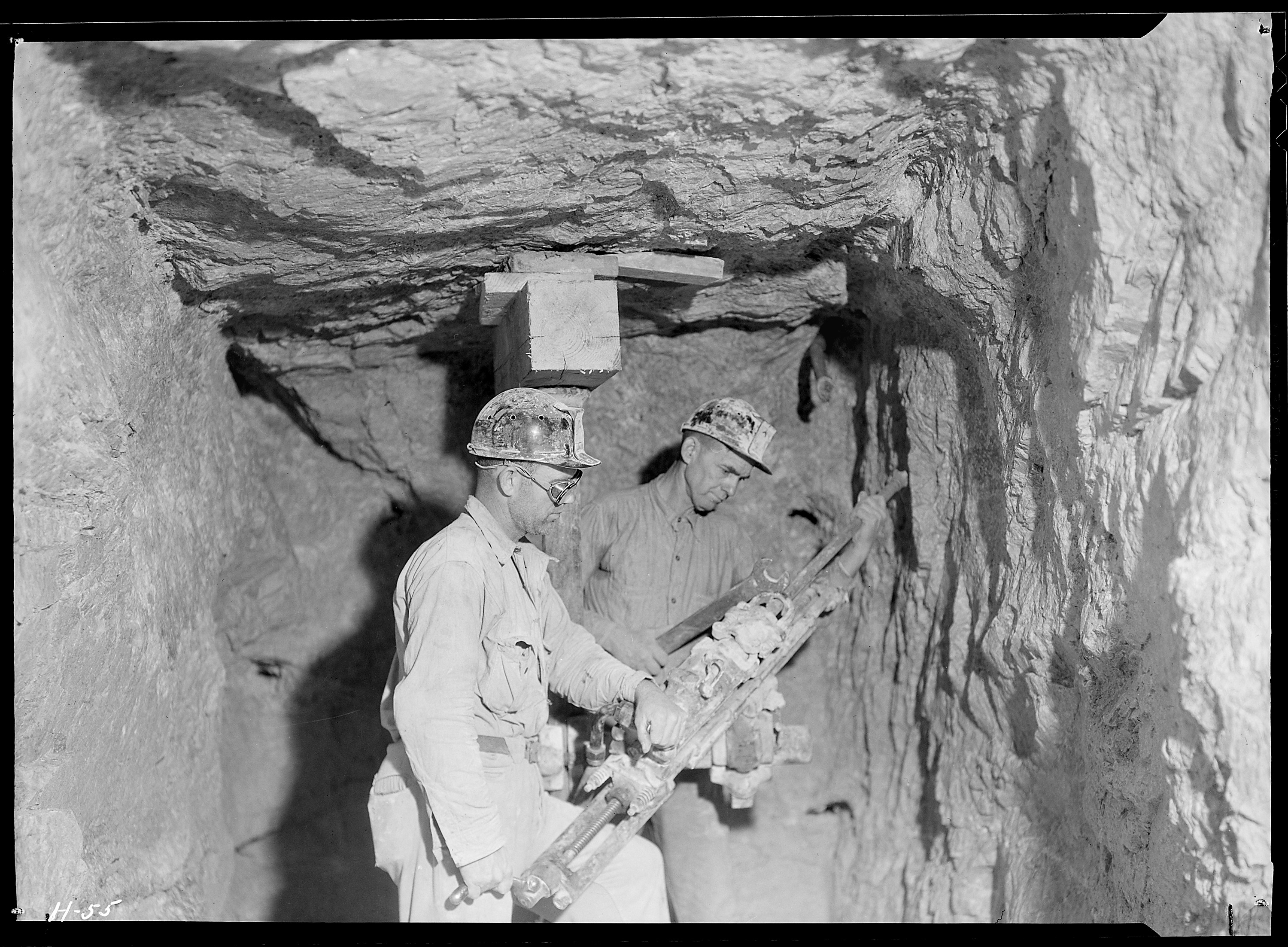
"Arthur Roberts and Sam Mynatt drilling in lateral test shaft for examination of substrata at base of Norris Dam." Photograph taken by Lewis Hine October 27, 1933

The building of Norris Dam and its accompanying reservoir required the purchase of over 152,000 acres (62,000 ha) of land. 2,841 families and 5,226 graves were relocated. The community of Loyston, located about 20 miles (32 km) upstream from the dam site, was entirely inundated. About a third of Caryville, at the head of the reservoir's Cove Creek embayment, was flooded and a number of structures in the town had to be moved. Several smaller 30-foot (9.1 m) earthen dams were built along reservoir tributaries to house fish hatcheries. As the project called for the construction of recreational areas along the lakeshore, TVA built two supplemental dams—Caryville Dam and Big Ridge Dam—to impound Cove Lake and Big Ridge Lake, respectively, and ensure these small lakes would remain filled year-round. The Civilian Conservation Corps built recreational facilities and aided in the removal of various structures. The town of Norris, Tennessee was initially built as a planned community to house the workers involved in the construction of this dam.

Norris Dam was completed and the gates closed on March 4, 1936, constructed at a cost of $36 million (equivalent to $638 million in 2024). The dam's first generator went online on July 28, 1936. Although Norris was the first dam built by TVA, it is not the oldest dam owned and operated by the agency. TVA subsequently purchased the assets of the former Tennessee Electric Power Company, including some dams which had been built before Norris Dam.

The building of Norris Dam and the changes it brought to the region inspired films, books, stage plays, and songs. Folk songs from the construction period express enthusiasm for the benefits that the dam project brought to the region. Notable visitors to the dam included President Franklin D. Roosevelt and First Lady Eleanor Roosevelt, French philosopher Jean-Paul Sartre, journalist Ernie Pyle, Swiss architect Le Corbusier, track star Jesse Owens, and Indian Prime Minister Jawaharlal Nehru. In 1941, the dam was the subject of a photography exhibit at the Museum of Modern Art in New York.

== Legacy ==
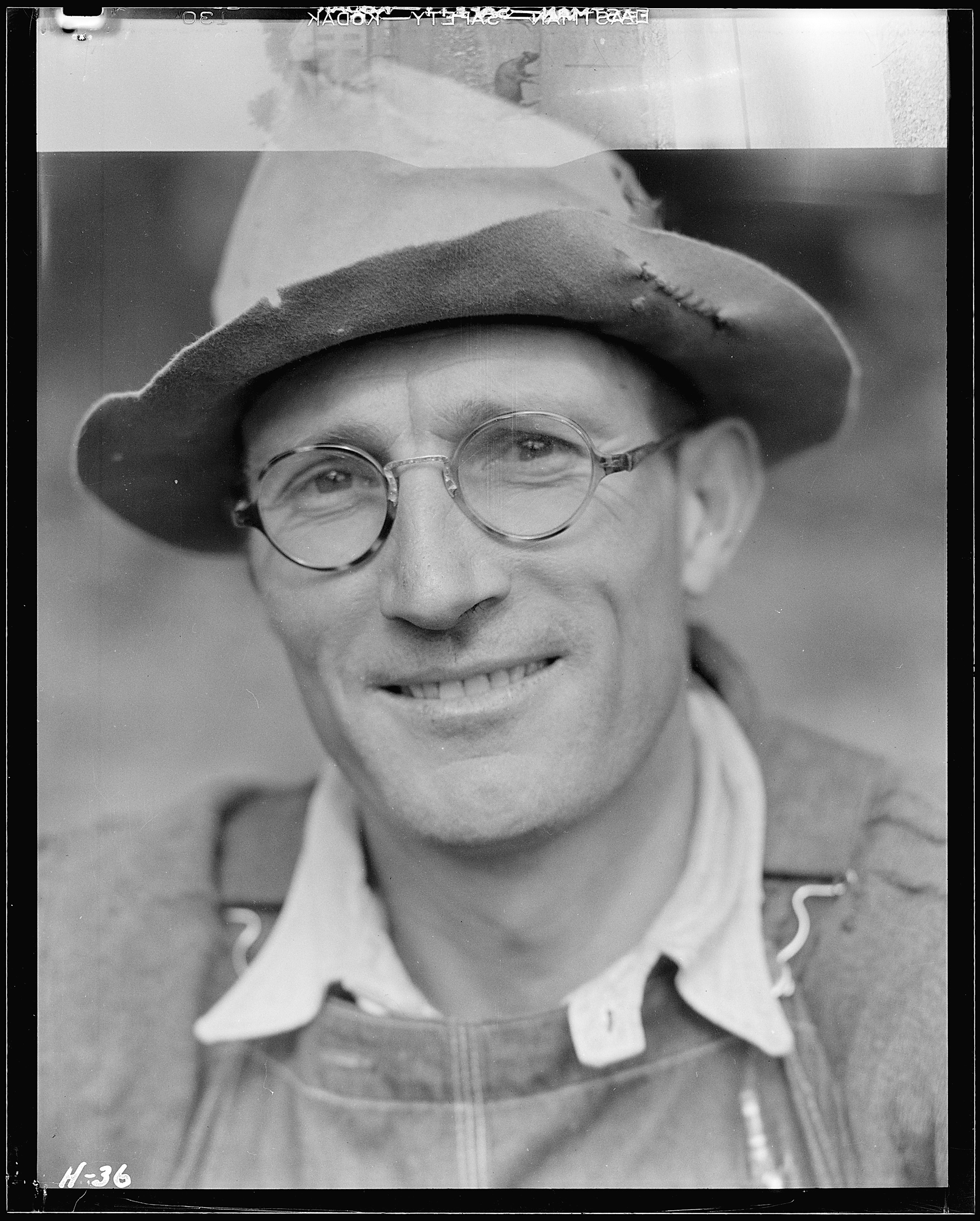
Curt Stiner, a farmer from the Sharps Chapel area of Union County, was among those displaced for Norris Dam. Stiner criticized the TVA's property acquisition methods, having to sell his farm to TVA for an amount less than he had paid to his father before constructing new farm buildings on it as well.

The project's intent of providing aid to residents of the Clinch and Powell watershed has been argued by scholars and historians, specifically regarding the TVA's acquisition of roughly 150,000 acres (61,000 ha) of farmland, and the displacement of an estimated 3,000 families and 5,300 graves. Many of the dead buried in cemeteries that were to be flooded by the dam reservoir were disinterred and reburied in four "re-interment cemeteries" established by the TVA: Baker's Forge Memorial Cemetery, Cumberland View Cemetery, Big Barren Memorial Cemetery, and New Loyston Memorial Cemetery.

Union County, the most negatively impacted county of the Norris Project, would encounter the inundation of the unincorporated town of Loyston and other scarce communities of the Big Valley region of Union County. The town of Big Barren and the settlement of Baker's Forge were also inundated. After the project's completion, the Big Valley region of Union County, promised its electrification by the project's end, would not receive electricity until the late 1940s and early 1950s. Some of the displaced in the aftermath of the Norris Project would commit suicide, unable to bear the stress of the loss of their lifestyles.
