= Norris, Tennessee =

- City
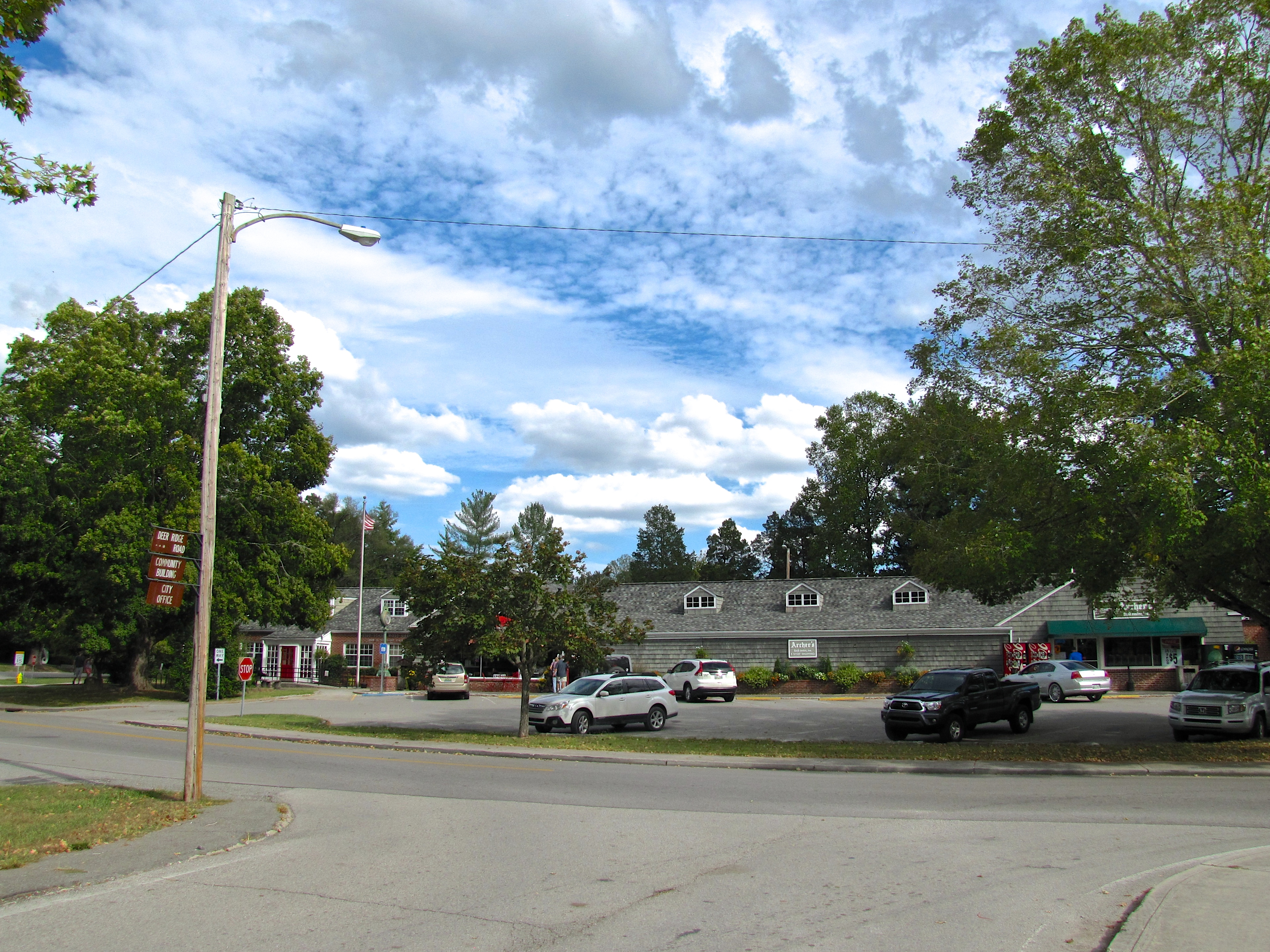
- Post office and Archer's Food Center in Norris

- Location of Norris in Anderson County, Tennessee.
- Coordinates: 36°11′58″N 84°4′9″W
- Country: United States
- State: Tennessee
- County: Anderson
- Established: 1933
- Incorporated: 1949
- Named for: George W. Norris

Government
  - Mayor: Chris Mitchell
  - City Manager: Scott Hackler

Area
  - Total: 8.33 sq mi (21.58 km^{2})
  - Land: 8.33 sq mi (21.58 km^{2})
  - Water: 0 sq mi (0.00 km^{2})
- Elevation: 1,079 ft (329 m)

Population (2020)
  - Total: 1,599
  - Density: 191.9/sq mi (74.09/km^{2})
- Time zone: UTC-5 (Eastern (EST))
  - Summer (DST): UTC-4 (EDT)
- ZIP code: 37705, 37828
- Area code: 865
- FIPS code: 47-53600
- GNIS feature ID: 1295831
- Website: www.cityofnorris.com

Norris is a city in Anderson County, Tennessee. Its population was 1,599 at the 2020 census. It is included in the Knoxville, TN Metropolitan Statistical Area.

Norris was built as a model planned community by the Tennessee Valley Authority (TVA) in 1933 to house workers building Norris Dam on the Clinch River. It is named in honor of George W. Norris, a Senator from Nebraska, who was a long-term supporter of the TVA.

== History ==
TVA chairman Arthur Morgan envisioned Norris as a model of cooperative, egalitarian living. The city design was developed by TVA staff, who loosely based their design on the English garden city movement of the 1890s. Winding roads followed the contour of the terrain. Houses did not always face the street. A central common green and a belt of rural land around the town were reserved for use by residents. The houses, which were some of the first all-electric homes, were built using local wood and stone, according to twelve basic house designs that each included a porch and fireplace. Different exterior materials were used for visual variety.

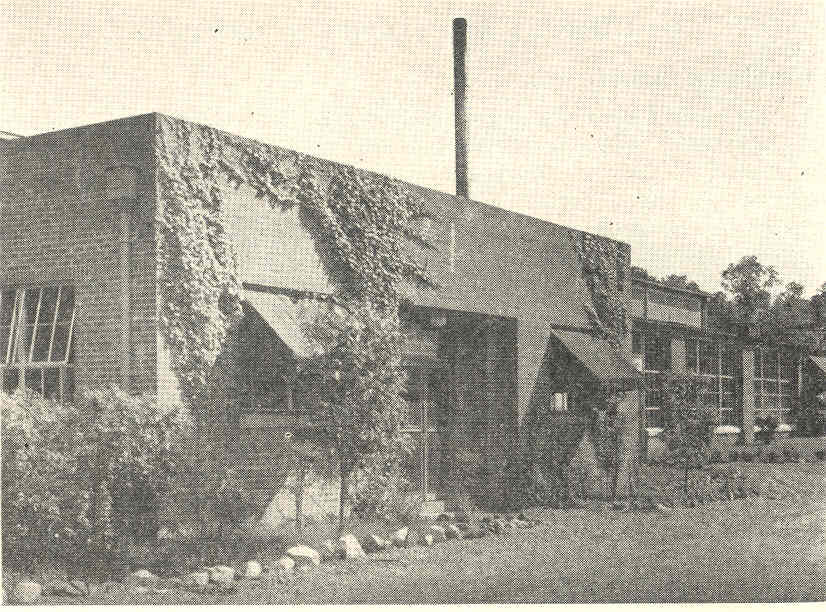
Hydraulics laboratory building in the 1930s

Norris represents the first use of greenbelt design principles in a self-contained town in the United States. The town was the first in Tennessee to have a complete system of dial telephones. Norris Creamery was the first milk-producing plant in the world to be powered solely by electricity.

During the 1930s, TVA officials excluded black families from the city, effectively making it a sundown town, purportedly to conform to the customs and traditions of the area. However, black leaders said that poor whites and blacks had lived and worked together in the area long before the TVA came into existence. The National Association for the Advancement of Colored People (NAACP) complained repeatedly (in 1934, 1935 and 1938) about racial discrimination by the TVA in the hiring, housing and training of blacks.

In 1948 the U.S. Congress directed that the city be sold at public auction. It was purchased for $2.1 million ($28,140,582 in 2025 dollars) by a Philadelphia investment group headed by Henry D. Epstein, which then sold individual homes to their residents. The city was officially incorporated in 1949. In 1953 the Epstein group sold its remaining Norris real estate to a corporation formed by Norris residents and known as the Norris Corporation.

The town, including 340 buildings and an area of about 4,000 acres (16 km^{2}), was added to the National Register of Historic Places in 1975 as an historic district, designated the Norris District.

Today Norris primarily serves as a bedroom community for Knoxville and Oak Ridge. Services available within the community include one elementary school serving grades K-5, one middle school serving grades 6–8, a small grocer, and many other small businesses. The community's high school students attend Anderson County High School.

The Museum of Appalachia, founded by John Rice Irwin, is a popular attraction in Norris. Norris is a short distance from Norris Dam State Park, part of which is in the city, and Big Ridge State Park, which include popular camping areas.

== Geography ==
Norris is located in northern Anderson County at 36°11′58″N 84°4′9″W (36.199515, −84.069077), on a set of hills south of the Clinch River. U.S. Route 441, the Norris Freeway, arcs around the west side of the city, leading south 21 miles (34 km) to Knoxville and northwest 10 miles (16 km) to Rocky Top. Interstate 75 passes 2 miles (3 km) to the southwest of the city, with access via Tennessee State Route 61 from Exit 122.

According to the United States Census Bureau, the city has a total area of 7.2 square miles (18.6 km^{2}), all of it land. A large portion of this area is contained in the Norris Municipal Watershed, which has an area of more than 2,200 acres (8.9 km^{2}) and is managed for water supply, recreation, timber production, and wildlife, including deer hunting. There are nearly 20 miles (32 km) of recreation trails on the watershed area.

=== Climate ===
Climate data for Norris, Tennessee (1991–2020 normals, extremes 1935–present)
| Month | Jan | Feb | Mar | Apr | May | Jun | Jul | Aug | Sep | Oct | Nov | Dec | Year |
|---|---|---|---|---|---|---|---|---|---|---|---|---|---|
| Record high °F (°C) | 76 (24) | 80 (27) | 87 (31) | 92 (33) | 94 (34) | 104 (40) | 105 (41) | 100 (38) | 102 (39) | 93 (34) | 88 (31) | 75 (24) | 105 (41) |
| Mean daily maximum °F (°C) | 44.4 (6.9) | 49.8 (9.9) | 59.6 (15.3) | 70.1 (21.2) | 77.0 (25.0) | 82.7 (28.2) | 85.1 (29.5) | 84.5 (29.2) | 79.8 (26.6) | 69.5 (20.8) | 57.4 (14.1) | 47.5 (8.6) | 67.3 (19.6) |
| Daily mean °F (°C) | 34.8 (1.6) | 38.8 (3.8) | 46.5 (8.1) | 55.6 (13.1) | 64.0 (17.8) | 71.1 (21.7) | 74.2 (23.4) | 73.5 (23.1) | 68.0 (20.0) | 56.6 (13.7) | 45.6 (7.6) | 38.1 (3.4) | 55.6 (13.1) |
| Mean daily minimum °F (°C) | 25.2 (−3.8) | 27.8 (−2.3) | 33.3 (0.7) | 41.1 (5.1) | 50.9 (10.5) | 59.4 (15.2) | 63.4 (17.4) | 62.5 (16.9) | 56.3 (13.5) | 43.8 (6.6) | 33.8 (1.0) | 28.7 (−1.8) | 43.9 (6.6) |
| Record low °F (°C) | −19 (−28) | −17 (−27) | −3 (−19) | 19 (−7) | 20 (−7) | 35 (2) | 41 (5) | 42 (6) | 30 (−1) | 19 (−7) | 6 (−14) | −6 (−21) | −19 (−28) |
| Average precipitation inches (mm) | 5.11 (130) | 5.35 (136) | 5.48 (139) | 5.75 (146) | 4.31 (109) | 4.87 (124) | 5.38 (137) | 4.27 (108) | 4.06 (103) | 3.37 (86) | 4.03 (102) | 5.69 (145) | 57.67 (1,465) |
| Average snowfall inches (cm) | 1.1 (2.8) | 1.5 (3.8) | 0.1 (0.25) | 0.0 (0.0) | 0.0 (0.0) | 0.0 (0.0) | 0.0 (0.0) | 0.0 (0.0) | 0.0 (0.0) | 0.0 (0.0) | 0.0 (0.0) | 0.4 (1.0) | 3.1 (7.9) |
| Average precipitation days (≥ 0.01 in) | 12.4 | 11.9 | 12.5 | 11.2 | 12.1 | 13.0 | 13.0 | 10.1 | 8.3 | 8.4 | 9.2 | 11.6 | 133.7 |
| Average snowy days (≥ 0.1 in) | 0.7 | 0.6 | 0.1 | 0.0 | 0.0 | 0.0 | 0.0 | 0.0 | 0.0 | 0.0 | 0.0 | 0.2 | 1.6 |
Source: NOAA

== Demographics ==
Historical population
| Census | Pop. | Note | %± |
|---|---|---|---|
| 1950 | 1,134 | | — |
| 1960 | 1,389 | | 22.5% |
| 1970 | 1,359 | | −2.2% |
| 1980 | 1,374 | | 1.1% |
| 1990 | 1,303 | | −5.2% |
| 2000 | 1,446 | | 11.0% |
| 2010 | 1,491 | | 3.1% |
| 2020 | 1,599 | | 7.2% |

=== 2020 census ===
Racial composition as of the 2020 census
| Race | Number | Percent |
|---|---|---|
| White | 1,506 | 94.2% |
| Black or African American | 6 | 0.4% |
| American Indian and Alaska Native | 5 | 0.3% |
| Asian | 11 | 0.7% |
| Native Hawaiian and Other Pacific Islander | 0 | 0.0% |
| Some other race | 16 | 1.0% |
| Two or more races | 55 | 3.4% |
| Hispanic or Latino (of any race) | 30 | 1.9% |

As of the 2020 census, Norris had a population of 1,599 and a median age of 52.1 years; 19.1% of residents were under the age of 18 and 31.5% were 65 years of age or older, and there were 86.6 males for every 100 females and 82.0 males for every 100 females age 18 and over.

The census counted 704 households, of which 24.6% had children under the age of 18 living in them, and 330 families resided in the city. Of all households, 51.0% were married-couple households, 14.1% had a male householder with no spouse or partner present, 31.1% had a female householder with no spouse or partner present, 38.1% were made up of individuals, and 22.7% had someone living alone who was 65 years of age or older.

There were 768 housing units, of which 8.3% were vacant; the homeowner vacancy rate was 1.0% and the rental vacancy rate was 8.3%.

71.4% of residents lived in urban areas, while 28.6% lived in rural areas.

=== 2010 census ===
As of the census of 2010, there were 1,491 people living in the city.

=== 2000 census ===
Statistics based on the 2000 census are: the population density was 210.6 inhabitants per square mile (81.3/km^{2}). There were 682 housing units at an average density of 99.3 per square mile (38.3/km^{2}). The racial makeup of the city was 98.41% White, 0.21% African American, 0.48% Native American, 0.14% Asian, 0.21% from other races, and 0.55% from two or more races. Hispanic or Latino of any race were 0.55% of the population.

There were 644 households, out of which 29.2% had children under the age of 18 living with them, 54.8% were married couples living together, 8.7% had a female householder with no husband present, and 33.7% were non-families. 31.8% of all households were made up of individuals, and 16.9% had someone living alone who was 65 years of age or older. The average household size was 2.25 and the average family size was 2.83.

In the city, the population was spread out, with 23.2% under the age of 18, 5.0% from 18 to 24, 24.5% from 25 to 44, 28.1% from 45 to 64, and 19.2% who were 65 years of age or older. The median age was 43 years. For every 100 females, there were 88.0 males. For every 100 females age 18 and over, there were 79.3 males.

The median income for a household in the city was US$47,105, and the median income for a family was US$55,179. Males had a median income of US$41,813 versus US$27,727 for females. The per capita income for the city was US$29,832. About 0.7% of families and 4.7% of the population were below the poverty line, including 6.1% of those under age 18 and 6.5% of those age 65 or over.

== Government ==
The government of Norris is vested in a five-member city council, with a mayor and vice-mayor being selected among that group.

The original city hall was located in the Norris Community Building, along with the town library and the multi-purpose auditorium/gymnasium on Ridgeway Drive until 1978, when it was destroyed by a fire. The cause was never determined. The city hall then moved to a location on Chestnut Drive, but this location was destroyed in a fire in 2002. The facility on Chestnut Drive was reconstructed and continues to serve as a City Office and Community Building. The Norris Public Safety Department is located at 9 West Circle Road.

The city of Norris also helps fund a public library. The library has about 20,000 materials in its collection and is located in the McNeeley Municipal Building.
