= Powell River (Tennessee River tributary) =

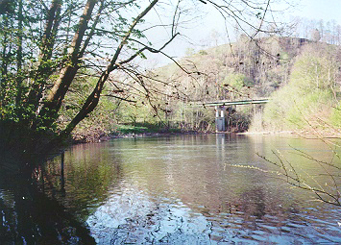
- The Powell River near Harrogate in Claiborne County, Tennessee

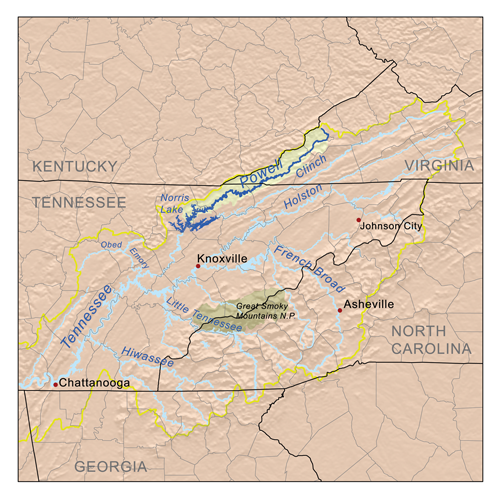
- The Powell drainage basin

Location
- Country: United States
- State: Virginia, Tennessee

Physical characteristics
- Source: Indian Mountain in Wise County, Virginia
  - coordinates: 37°01′51″N 82°42′25″W
  - elevation: 3,490 ft (1,060 m)
- Mouth: Clinch River in Claiborne County, Tennessee
  - coordinates: 36°17′49″N 84°01′34″W
  - elevation: 1,020 ft (310 m)
- Length: 195.5 mi (314.6 km)
- Basin size: 954 sq mi (2,470 km^{2})
- Discharge
  - location: US-25E bridge near Arthur, Tennessee, 65.4 miles (105.3 km) above the mouth(mean for water years 1919-1979)
  - average: 1,157 cu ft/s (32.8 m^{3}/s)(mean for water years 1919-1979)
  - minimum: 47 cu ft/s (1.3 m^{3}/s); January 1940
  - maximum: 59,500 cu ft/s (1,680 m^{3}/s); April 1977

The Powell River is a 195-mile-long river in the United States that rises in Southwest Virginia and flows southwest into East Tennessee.

The South Fork of the river rises in rural Wise County, Virginia, near the Laurel Grove community northwest of Norton and flows for several miles before the confluence with Roaring Fork in the Kent Junction community. From Kent Junction the river flows until it meets the North Fork of the river near Woodway, Virginia. The North Folk originates near Keokee, Virginia. The river flows past Big Stone Gap, Virginia, and then runs nearly the entire length of Lee County, Virginia. It drains approximately 954 square miles (2,471 km^{2}) in both Virginia and Tennessee before reaching its confluence with the Clinch River in the Norris Lake reservoir at the site of the town of Grantsboro, Tennessee.

The Powell River was named for Ambrose Powell who accompanied the exploration party of Dr. Thomas Walker in the mid-18th century. Legend has it that his name appeared so frequently carved on trees in the valley of this river that later explorers and early pioneers came to call the stream "Powell's River" and the valley "Powell's Valley".

The Powell River was designated by the Environmental Protection Agency (EPA) as the "second most biologically diverse aquatic system in the nation." The Powell is under pressure from the effects of mining (including strip mining), logging and associated road-building.

Lincoln Memorial University operates the Powell River Aquatic Research Station, which is located where Tennessee State Route 63 crosses the river at the Brooks Bridge in Claiborne County, Tennessee. The center allows for on-site research of water quality, flora, fauna and related habitat.

Fishing in the Powell River can be great in some areas; in Wise County the Virginia Department of Wildlife Resources stocks trout in the shallow rushing waters of the Middle Fork under a "delayed harvest" designation. Downstream from Lee County, the river is home to smallmouth bass, largemouth bass, red eye bass, bluegill, carp, red horses, walleye, sauger and even musky. A lot of people kayak the river and even wade to fish.

In July 2024, the Tennessee Valley Authority (TVA) and the Virginia Department of Wildlife Resources (DWR) celebrated improved stream access to the Powell River in Jonesville, Virginia. After completing the projects, kayakers and anglers could easily get to the water in three areas along the Powell River that had been inaccessible by public land areas.

== See also ==
- List of Tennessee rivers
- List of Virginia rivers
