= Clinch River =

River in Virginia and Tennessee, US

Clinch River Pellissippi
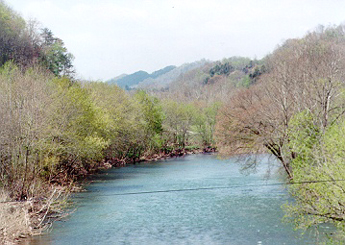
- The Clinch River at Speers Ferry in Scott County, Virginia

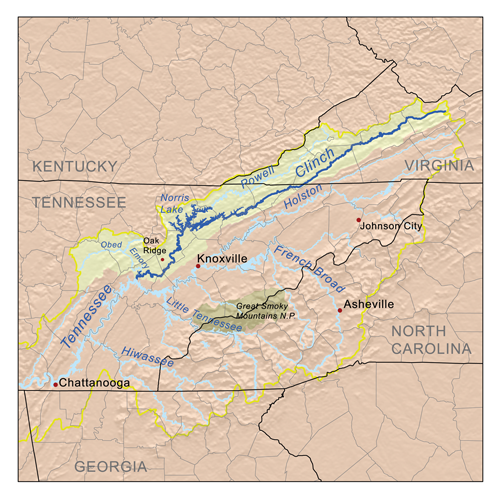
- Map of the Clinch River

Location
- Country: United States
- State: Virginia, Tennessee

Physical characteristics
- Source: Buckhorn Mountain near Tazewell, Virginia
  - coordinates: 37°08′29″N 81°27′41″W
  - elevation: 2,760 ft (840 m)
- Mouth: Tennessee River at Kingston, Tennessee
  - coordinates: 35°51′48″N 84°31′54″W
  - elevation: 741 ft (226 m)
- Length: 337 mi (542 km)
- Basin size: 4,413 sq mi (11,430 km^{2})
- Discharge
  - location: Grissom Island near Tazewell, Tennessee, 159.8 miles (257.2 km) above the mouth(mean for water years 1918-1983)
  - average: 2,100 cu ft/s (59 m^{3}/s)(mean for water years 1918-1983)
  - minimum: 108 cu ft/s (3.1 m^{3}/s); September 1925
  - maximum: 98,100 cu ft/s (2,780 m^{3}/s); April 1977

Basin features
- Tributaries
  - left: Little River, Beaver Creek
  - right: Guest River, North Fork Clinch River, Powell River, Coal Creek, Poplar Creek, Emory River

The Clinch River is a river that flows southwest for more than 300 miles (480 km) through the Great Appalachian Valley in the U.S. states of Virginia and Tennessee, gathering various tributaries, including the Powell River, before joining the Tennessee River in Kingston, Tennessee.

== Name ==
Clinch was the name of an 18th-century explorer of the area. Former variations of the name included "Clinch's River," "Clench River," "Clinches River," and "Fiume Clinchs." Folk etymology, however, provides a more colorful account: the river received its name after a pioneer fell into it and shouted, "Clinch me! Clinch me!", supposedly meaning "clench me" or "grab me".

An older name for the river, which appears on some early maps, was the "Pelisipi River," with such variant spellings as "Pelisippi" and "Pellissippi," and the variant form "Fiume Pelissipi". The Mitchell Map (1755–1757) labels a tributary of the "Pelisipi River" as "Clinch's River." The word "Pellissippi" was long said to have been the Cherokee language name for the river and was purported to mean "winding waters."

Research completed in 2017 concluded that the Miami-Illinois name Mosopeleacipi ("river of the Mosopelea" tribe) was first applied to what later European settlers called the Ohio River. Shortened in the Shawnee language to pelewa thiipi, spelewathiipi or peleewa thiipiiki, the name evolved through other variant forms such as "Polesipi," "Peleson," "Pele Sipi," and "Pere Sipi." It was eventually stabilized to the "Pelisipi/Pelisippi/Pellissippi" form. These names were variously applied back and forth between the Ohio and Clinch rivers. The name Pellissippi has been used in proper names throughout East Tennessee, for example in Pellissippi Parkway and Pellissippi State Community College.

== Course ==
The Clinch River is dammed twice: by Norris Dam, the first dam built by the Tennessee Valley Authority (TVA); and by the Melton Hill Dam, the only TVA dam with a navigation lock that is not located on the main channel of the Tennessee River.

An important tributary of the Clinch River is the Powell River. The Clinch and Powell drainage basins are separated by Powell Mountain. Tributaries entering the Clinch River below Norris Dam but above Melton Hill Dam include Coal Creek, Hinds Creek, Bull Run Creek, and Beaver Creek. Poplar Creek enters the river below the Melton Hill Dam.

== History ==
A peninsula located at the mouth of the Clinch River, later called Southwest Point, was important to generations of Native Americans. In the early colonial period, it was the site of a frontier fort. This structure has recently been reconstructed.

The Cherokee and European settlers signed a treaty at Southwest Point to allow the capital of Tennessee to be moved there. The Tennessee General Assembly fulfilled this requirement technically by meeting in Kingston for one day and then voting to move the capital city elsewhere. It later was moved to Nashville.

== Power industry ==
A power plant is located along the Clinch River at Carbo in Russell County, Virginia. It was completed in 1957 and is owned by Appalachian Power, a part of American Electric Power. The coal-fired plant was converted to natural gas in 2016. The Virginia City Hybrid Energy Center, another coal-fired power plant that began operations in 2012, is a few miles away outside St. Paul in Wise County, Virginia. It is owned by Dominion Virginia Power.

== Ecology ==
The Clinch River above Clinton, Tennessee (tailwaters of Norris Dam) is stocked with rainbow trout and brown trout by the Tennessee Wildlife Resources Agency.

Before being dammed, the Clinch River was a major producer of freshwater mussels and pearls. The rivers of the southern Appalachians are still notable for their unusually rich mussel biodiversity. The mussels were an important food source for Native Americans. Scots-Irish and later British settlers used mussels as bait and hog feed.

The freshwater pearl industry thrived throughout the southern Appalachians in the late 19th century and early 20th century. The Clinch River and the Emory River were considered the economic heart of the pearl industry, and Tennessee was one of the top six states in the United States for pearl production. The mussel-based industries began to decline in the early 20th century and were effectively eliminated by the dams built by the TVA in the mid-20th century. The first major Tennessee River dam was Wilson Dam, built at a site known as Muscle Shoals, Alabama. The name may have referred to the freshwater mussels of the region (the shoals could also be named for the exertion necessary to move river traffic across them). Norris Dam and Norris Lake on the Clinch River flooded one of the other areas of mussel near Young's Island.

Pollution of the river from mining in the region has caused great concern among environmentalists because several rare species inhabit the river. Some mussels were reintroduced to the Cleveland, Virginia, area from outside the state in the early 2000s. Pollution of the 20th century had destroyed much of the historic mussels species.

In 2008, a dike rupture at a coal ash pond led to a large release of fly ash from the TVA's Kingston Fossil Plant depositing 2.6 million pounds of fly ash in the lower section of the river below the confluence of the Emory River. Although at first the TVA began cleaning the ash out of the river, in 2009 the EPA took over; they finished removing coal ash in 2010. The release of coal ash in rivers has been shown to result in increased sedimentation and the exposure of trace elements to aquatic organisms.

A study done several months after the spill revealed that the river had increased amounts of trace metals such as mercury and arsenic, which are dangerous throughout the food chain. A study done a year after the spill showed that there was a possibility of food web accumulation of methylmercury, but this had not yet been shown.

== Recreation ==
There are several state and local parks along the Clinch River in both Tennessee and Virginia, including:

- Big Ridge State Park
- Norris Dam State Park
- Chuck Swan State Forest
- Clinch River State Park

== See also ==
- List of rivers of Tennessee
- List of rivers of Virginia
